= MAX Machine =

1982 home computer

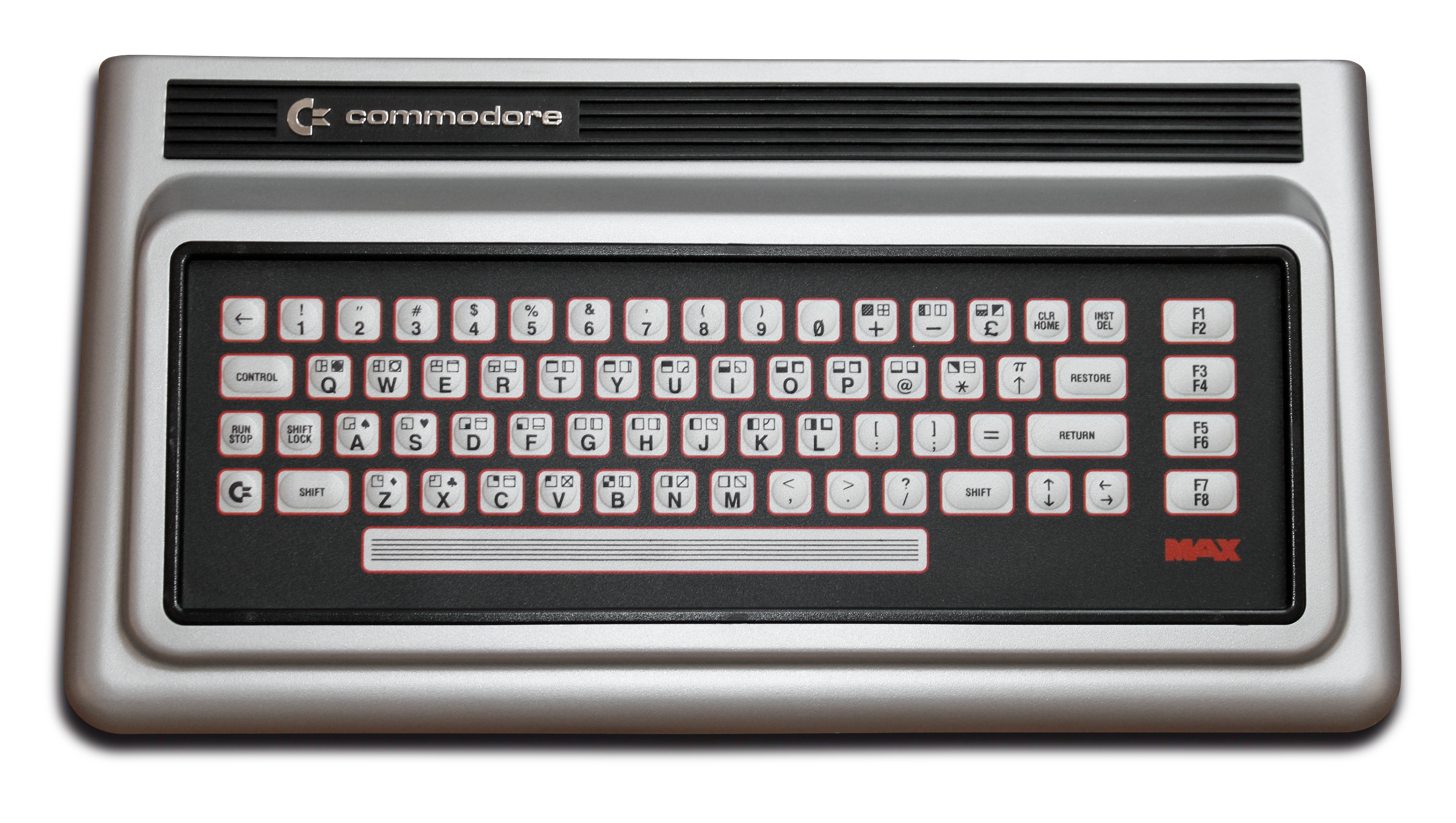
- Also known as: Ultimax, VC-10
- Type: Console / home computer
- Released: 1982; 44 years ago
- Introductory price: US$200 (equivalent to $670 in 2025)
- Discontinued: 1982
- Operating system: none - optional MAX BASIC (Cartridge)
- CPU: 6510 @ 1.02 MHz
- Memory: 2 KB, 0.5 KB color RAM
- Graphics: VIC-II 6566 (320 x 200, 16 colors, sprites, raster interrupt)
- Sound: SID 6581 (3x Osc, 4x Wave, Filter, ADSR, Ring)
- Predecessor: VIC-20
- Successor: Commodore 64

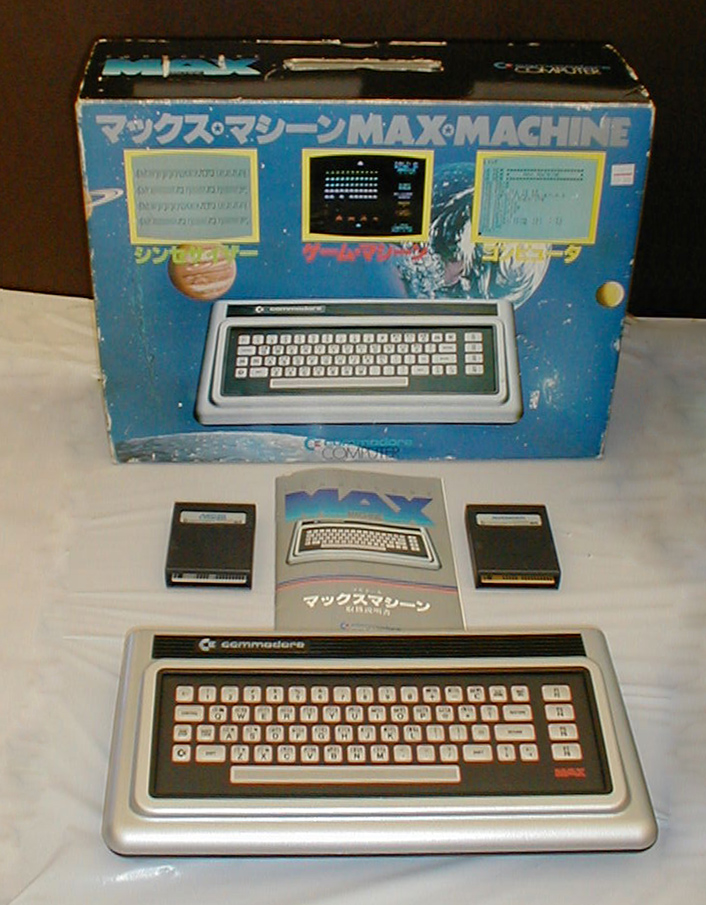
MAX Machine, accessories, and retail packaging

MAX Machine (or simply MAX), also known as Ultimax in the United States and Canada and VC-10 in Germany, is a home computer designed and sold by Commodore International in Japan, beginning in November of 1982, a cousin to the popular Commodore 64, also sharing a lot of components with the C64. The Commodore 64 manual mentions the machine by name, suggesting that Commodore intended to sell the machine internationally; however, it is unclear whether the machine was ever actually sold outside Japan. When it was officially presented, in Tokyo, for the first time, it was named Commodore VICKIE.

The unit has a membrane keyboard and 2 KB of RAM internally and 0.5 KB of color RAM (1024 × 4 bits). Display is output to a television set. It uses the same chipset and 6510 CPU as the Commodore 64, the same SID sound chip, and a MOS Technology 6566 graphics chip, a version of the VIC-II that powers the C64 graphics for the MAX's static RAM. A tape drive could be connected for storage, but each cartridge had to implement its own cassette driver and protocol routines, so the tape could only be used by 2 of 24 released programs. The MAX also lacks the serial and user ports necessary to connect a disk drive, printer, or modem. The lack of any built-in operating system, not even a simple bootstrap OS, combined with the fact that all the software released for the platform are video games (besides a scaled down cartridge-based BASIC with no disk, modem, or printer support) positions the Max as a video game console rather than a home computer, despite sharing much of the Commodore 64's chipset. The MAX's 2KB of RAM also indicates it was intended as a games machine and not a personal computer. Even the Commodore PET, released five years earlier in 1977, had a minimum of 4KB RAM, and rapidly 8KB became the minimum. Even the VIC-20, heavily criticized for its minimal RAM, shipped with 5KB of RAM.

Software is loaded from plug-in cartridges - turning on the MAX with no cartridge inserted yielded only a blank screen. Its ROM cartridge architecture was compatible with that of the C64, so that MAX cartridges will work in the C64. The MAX compatibility mode in C64 was later frequently used for "freezer" cartridges (such as the Action Replay), as a convenient way to take control of the currently running program.

It was intended to sell for around US$200. Although the MAX had better graphics and sound capability, Commodore's own VIC-20, which sold for around the same amount, was much more expandable, had a much larger software library, and had a better keyboard—all of which made it more attractive to consumers. The MAX never sold well and was quickly discontinued.

== MAX Machine software ==
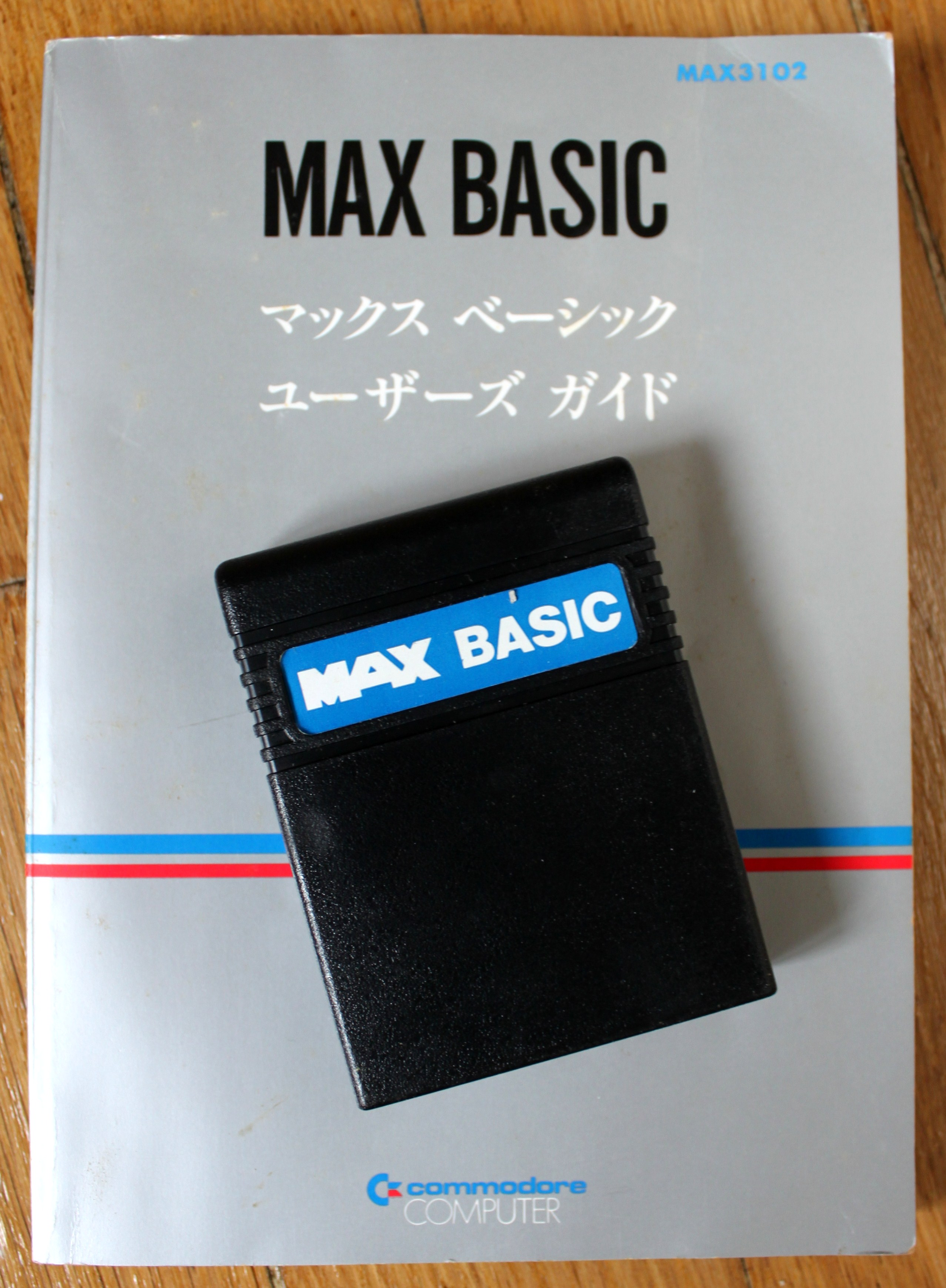
Commodore MAX BASIC manual and cartridge for Commodore MAX Machine

The MAX Machine's software list was limited, with a few game ports of popular arcade games.

Title	Year	Developer
Omega Race	1982	Commodore Japan
Wizard of Wor	1982	Commodore Japan
Kick Man	1982	Midway Games
Avenger	1983	Commodore Japan
Jupiter Lander	1982	HAL Laboratory
Super Alien (Heiankyo Alien)	1982	Commodore Japan
Radar Rat Race	1982	Commodore Japan
Road Race (Night Driver)	1982	HAL Laboratory
Mole Attack	1982	HAL Laboratory
Clowns	1982	Commodore Japan
Money Wars	1982	HAL Laboratory
Poker		
Gorf	1983	Commodore Japan
Billiards	1983	HAL Laboratory
Pinball Spectacular (Bomb Bee)	1983	HAL Laboratory
Bowling (3511)	1983	HAL Laboratory
Slalom (3512)	1983	HAL Laboratory
Le Mans	1982	HAL Laboratory
Sea Wolf	1982	Commodore Japan
Mini Basic I (limited instructions, no tape support)		
Max Basic (compliant with CBM BASIC V2.0 and can use tapes)		
Music Composer	1982	Andy Finkel
Music Machine	1982	Commodore Japan
Speed Math and Bingo Math	1982	
Visible Solar System	1982	Commodore Japan

== See also ==
- Commodore 64 Games System
