= HAL Laboratory =

Japanese video game developer

HAL Laboratory, Inc.
- Logo since December 1998
- Native name: 株式会社ハル研究所
- Romanized name: Kabushiki gaisha Haru Kenkyūjo
- Type: Private
- Industry: Video games
- Genre: Video game development; Game engine development; Merchandising
- Founded: February 21, 1980; 46 years ago
- Founder: Mitsuhiro Ikeda
- Headquarters: Nakano M-SQUARE, 4-14-1 Nakano, Nakano, Tokyo, Japan
- Number of locations: 2 studios (Note: Tokyo R&D Center and Yamanashi R&D Center) (2019)
- Key people: Shigefumi Kawase (president and CEO); Shinya Kumazaki (director); Nobutoshi Kuroki (director)
- Products: Eggerland series; Kirby series; Mother series; Super Smash Bros. series; BoxBoy! series
- Number of employees: 270 (2026)
- Website: www.hallab.co.jp

HAL Laboratory, Inc., (Note: Japanese: 株式会社ハル研究所, Hepburn: Kabushiki gaisha Haru Kenkyūjo) formerly shortened as HALKEN, is a Japanese video game developer based in Nakano, Nakano, Tokyo, with an additional office in Kai, Yamanashi. It was founded on February 21, 1980 by Mitsuhiro Ikeda. The company is best known for the Kirby series, but also worked on the Mother and Super Smash Bros. series. The company, which started out developing games for home computers, has been a partner with Nintendo since 1984.

Its logo, Inutamago, (Note: Japanese: 犬たまご; "Dog Eggs") which depicts a dog incubating eggs, is meant to represent "an unexpected bond [...] one that brings the birth of something new."

== History ==
HAL Laboratory was founded on February 21, 1980 in Kanda, Chiyoda Ward, Tokyo. Mitsuhiro Ikeda served as the first president and CEO. The company was formed out of a Seibu Department Store in Ikebukuro, with many of the students who frequented the computer section working part-time. This included Satoru Iwata and Satoshi Matsuoka. HAL initially started out of an apartment in Akihabara, developing hardware peripherals. An early investor was Iwasaki Giken, a company that programmed many of Nintendo's first video games.

In its early years, it developed products like a universal remote, the HAL Fax, which allowed users to fax directly from a computer, and the HAL Catch, a cable that connected an electronic organizer to a PC. Other products included the GSX-8800 sound board for the NEC PC-8001 in 1983, the CAT trackball, and the Hibiki FM tone generator and MIDI interface board in 1986.

There have been conflicting claims on the origin of the company's name: during a GDC 2005 keynote, HAL alumnus and then-Nintendo president Satoru Iwata stated that HAL was named after the computer from 2001: A Space Odyssey, while in a 2012 Iwata Asks interview, he said the company was named HAL because "each letter put [them] one step ahead of IBM."

The company first made games for home computers, such as the MSX and VIC-20. These were initially unlicensed home computer versions of Namco's arcade games, including Pac-Man (Jelly Monsters) Rally-X, and Galaxian. However, HAL managed to be the first company to obtain a license from Namco for developing computer games.

Through its connection to Iwasaki Giken, HAL started its business relationship with Nintendo in 1984. It assisted in the development of first-party Famicom games such as Pinball and Golf, while also creating original titles such as F1 Race. The company's previous experience developing games and its familiarity with the Famicom's CPU helped the developers make games faster than the competition. In the west, some titles were published under HAL America Inc. (HAI), a North American subsidiary of the company led by Yash Terakura and based in Beaverton, Oregon. Between 1987 and 1991, HAL also published several NES titles, including Stargate and Kabuki: Quantum Fighter. Masahiro Sakurai joined the company in 1989.

In 1991, the company moved to an office building overlooking Mount Fuji in Yamanashi. In 1992, HAL spun off its non-Nintendo business as HAL Corporation. It continued to work on computer software and peripherals, including new versions of the universal remote controller. This company continued to operate until around 2002.

However, following the protracted development of Metal Slader Glory, the company was $1.5 billion yen in debt and on the verge of bankruptcy. Nintendo offered to rescue HAL on the condition that Satoru Iwata were to be appointed its president. In 1992, HAL released Kirby's Dream Land for the Nintendo Game Boy, which was Iwata's first game as president. HAL then found success soon after, releasing Kirby's Adventure, Kirby's Dream Course, and Mother 2.

The company's current logo, Inutamago (literally "dog egg"), was created in 1998 by Shigesato Itoi. The imagery is meant to represent "an unexpected bond [...] one that brings the birth of something new". Reception was reportedly lukewarm at first. The first game to use the logo was Super Smash Bros. In 1999, HAL released Pokemon Snap for the Nintendo 64 and Pokemon Pinball on Game Boy Color and established an R&D center in Tokyo that year.

For a time, HAL struggled to develop a 3D Kirby game. Following the release of Kirby 64 in 2000, Iwata left to work at Nintendo and the company worked on three games that were ultimately cancelled. During this time, HAL also worked on Nintendo's hardware, developing the software library called "sysdolphin" for the GameCube.

On July 31, 2001, HAL Laboratory and Nintendo jointly established Warpstar, Inc., a company created to oversee Kirby merchandising and outside media, such as the Kirby: Right Back at Ya! anime series. In March 2002, Nintendo president Hiroshi Yamauchi retired and named Iwata as his successor. In 2003, the company moved from Nintendo's Tokyo Prefecture Building in Nihonbashi, Chuo to a new office in Kanda Sudacho, Chiyoda. Sakurai also left HAL to become a freelance game designer, though he continued to work on the Super Smash Bros. series. In 2007, HAL worked with Atlus to produce a Kirby-themed medal game for arcades.

The company developed the internet browser and electronic instruction manual for both the Nintendo 3DS and Wii U. HAL released a Kirby-themed card game in 2015. In August 2016, it teamed with Nintendo to open the Kirby Café chain in Japan. HAL helped to develop software for the Nintendo Switch, creating its internet browser, Mii editor, photo library, and various game development environments and tools. It also released a Kirby-themed board game in 2017.

In 2017, HAL Laboratory announced that the company would start developing games for mobile devices under the brand name HAL Egg, in order to clearly differentiate them from the company's usual output. The first title released under the brand name was Part Time UFO. The game was a premium title, as the developers at HAL did not want to implement the more exploitative types of monetization that had become common in the industry. The company released miniature versions of the MZ-80C and PC-8001 computers in October 2017 and October 2019, respectively. A second mobile game, Housuu de Shoubu! Kame Sanpo was released in Japan in 2019.

In 2020, HAL relocated its office to Nintendo's new Tokyo building, alongside Nintendo EPD Tokyo, 1-Up Studio, and Game Freak. At this point, HAL had just under 200 employees.

In 2025, HAL sold its stake in Warpstar to Nintendo, with it subsequently rebranding to Nintendo Stars Inc., and expanded to include merchandising of film adaptations of Nintendo's properties.

On September 9, 2026, HAL left the Nintendo Tokyo building and moved their headquarters and Tokyo development base to Nakano.

== Games ==
List of video games developed and/or published by HAL Laboratory
Year	Title	Platform(s)	Ref.
1981	Heiankyo Alien	PC-8001	
1981	Avenger (Space Invaders clone)	VIC-20, Commodore 64	
1981	Jelly Monsters (Pac-Man clone)	VIC-20	
1981	Jupiter Lander (Lunar Lander clone)	VIC-20, Commodore 64	
1981	Mole Attack	VIC-20, Commodore 64	
1981	Poker	VIC-20, Commodore 64	
1981	Radar Rat Race (Rally-X clone)	VIC-20, Commodore 64	
1981	Road Race (Night Driver clone)	VIC-20, Commodore 64	
1981	Star Battle (Galaxian clone)	VIC-20	
1982	Kick Man	Commodore 64	
1982	Omega Race	Commodore 64	
1982	Pinball Spectacular	VIC-20, Commodore 64	
1982	Money Wars	VIC-20, Commodore 64	
1982	Lemans	Commodore 64	
1983	Bowling	Commodore 64	
1983	Clowns	Commodore 64	
1983	Gorf	Commodore 64	
1983	Ski (aka Slalom)	Commodore 64	
1983	Billiards	MSX	
1983	Butamaru Pants	MSX	
1983	Dragon Attack	MSX	
1983	Fruit Search	MSX	
1983	Heavy Boxing	MSX	
1983	Picture Puzzle	MSX	
1983	Space Maze Attack	MSX	
1983	Space Trouble	MSX	
1983	Step Up	MSX	
1983	Super Snake	MSX	
1983	Super Billiards	MSX	
1984	Balance	MSX	
1984	Rollerball	MSX	
1984	Hole in One	MSX	
1984	Mr. Ching	MSX	
1984	Pinball	Nintendo Entertainment System	
1984	Golf	Nintendo Entertainment System	
1984	F1 Race	Nintendo Entertainment System	
1985	Mach Rider	Nintendo Entertainment System	
1985	Balloon Fight	Nintendo Entertainment System	
1985	Cue Star	MSX	
1985	Eggerland Mystery	MSX	
1985	Karamaru's Strange Trip	MSX	
1985	Swimming Tango	MSX	
1985	Tetsuman	MSX	
1985	Lot Lot	Famicom	
1986	Dunkshot	MSX	
1986	Eggerland 2	MSX2	
1986	Gall Force: Defense of Chaos	MSX	
1986	Gall Force: Eternal Story	Famicom Disk System	
1986	Hole in One Professional	MSX	
1986	Inspecteur Z	MSX	
1986	Mobile Planet Stils	MSX	
1986	Othello	Famicom Disk System, Nintendo Entertainment System	
1987	Eggerland	Famicom Disk System	
1987	Family Computer Golf: Japan Course	Famicom Disk System	
1987	Family Computer Golf: U.S. Course	Famicom Disk System	
1987	Joust	Nintendo Entertainment System	
1987	Defender II	Nintendo Entertainment System	
1987	Air Fortress	Nintendo Entertainment System	
1987	Millipede	Nintendo Entertainment System	
1987	Hole in One Special	MSX2	
1987	Ninja-Kid II	MSX	
1987	Tokoro-san no Mamoru mo Semeru mo	Famicom	
1987	Zukkoke Yajikita Onmitsudoutyuu	MSX2	
1987	1988	Satsui no Kaisou: Power Soft Renzoku Satsujin Jiken	Famicom
Fire Bam	1988	Famicom Disk System	
Jumbo Ozaki no Hole in One Professional	1988	Famicom	
Vegas Dream	1988	Nintendo Entertainment System	
Famicom Grand Prix II: 3D Hot Rally	1988	Famicom Disk System	
Eggerland: Meikyū no Fukkatsu	1988	Famicom	
Eggerland: Sōzō e no Tabidachi	1988	Famicom Disk System	
Tashiro Masashi no Princess ga Ippai	1988	MSX2	
Rollerball	1988	Nintendo Entertainment System	
1989	Adventures of Lolo (NES)	Nintendo Entertainment System	
1989	Mother (Note: Co-developed with Ape)	Famicom	
1989	Pachipro Densetsu	MSX	
1989	Revenge of the 'Gator	Game Boy	
1989	Shanghai	Game Boy	
1989	Gozonji Yajikita Chindochu	Famicom	
1990		Famicom	
1990	Adventures of Lolo 2 (NES)	Nintendo Entertainment System	
1990	Uchūkeibitai SDF	Famicom	
1990	HAL Wrestling (Note: Developed by Human Entertainment)	Game Boy	
1990	Adventures of Lolo 3	Nintendo Entertainment System	
1990	Adventures of Lolo 2 (Famicom)	Famicom	
1990	New Ghostbusters II	Nintendo Entertainment System, Game Boy	
1991	Trax	Game Boy	
1991	HAL's Hole in One Golf	Super NES	
1991	Kabuki: Quantum Fighter	Nintendo Entertainment System	
1991	Metal Slader Glory	Famicom	
1991	HyperZone	Super NES	
1991	NES Open Tournament Golf	Nintendo Entertainment System	
1992	Arcana	Super NES	
1992	Day Dreamin' Davey (Note: Developed by Sculptured Software)	Nintendo Entertainment System	
1992	NCAA Basketball (Note: Japanese publishing only)	Super NES	
1992	Kirby's Dream Land	Game Boy	
1993	Vegas Stakes	Super NES, Game Boy	
1993	Kirby's Adventure	Nintendo Entertainment System	
1993	Kirby's Pinball Land	Game Boy	
1993	Alcahest	Super Famicom	
1994	Adventures of Lolo	Game Boy	
1994	EarthBound (Note: Co-developed with Ape)	Super NES	
1994	Kirby's Dream Course	Super NES	
1995	Kirby's Avalanche (Note: Co-developed with Compile)	Super NES	
1995	Kirby's Dream Land 2	Game Boy	
1995	SimCity 2000	Super NES	
1996	Kirby's Toy Box	Super Famicom (Satellaview)	
1996	Kirby Super Star	Super NES	
1996	Eggerland Episode 0: Quest of Lala	Windows	
1996	Eggerland for Windows 95	Windows	
1996	Special Tee Shot	Super Famicom (Satellaview)	
1997	Kirby's Star Stacker	Game Boy, Super Famicom	
1997	Itoi Shigesato no Bass Tsuri No. 1	Super Famicom	
1997	Kirby's Dream Land 3	Super NES	
1999	Super Smash Bros.	Nintendo 64	
1999	Pokémon Snap	Nintendo 64	
1999	Pokémon Pinball	Game Boy Color	
1999	Mingle Magnet	WonderSwan	
2000	SimCity 64	64DD	
2000	Itoi Shigesato no Bass Tsuri No. 1 Ketteihan!	Nintendo 64	
2000	Kirby 64: The Crystal Shards	Nintendo 64	
2000	Metal Slader Glory: Director's Cut	Super Famicom	
2001	Super Smash Bros. Melee	GameCube	
2002	Kirby: Nightmare in Dream Land	Game Boy Advance	
2003	Kirby Air Ride	GameCube	
2004	Kirby & the Amazing Mirror (Note: Co-developed with Flagship)	Game Boy Advance	
2005	Kirby Canvas Curse	Nintendo DS	
2006	Pokémon Ranger (Note: Co-developed with Creatures)	Nintendo DS	
2006	Mother 3 (Note: Co-developed with Brownie Brown)	Game Boy Advance	
2006	Common Sense Training	Nintendo DS	
2006	Kirby: Squeak Squad	Nintendo DS	
2008	Minna no Joshikiryoku TV	Wii	
2008	Kirby Super Star Ultra	Nintendo DS	
2009	Picross 3D	Nintendo DS	
2010	Face Pilot: Fly with your Nintendo DSi Camera!	Nintendo DSi	
2011	Face Raiders	Nintendo 3DS	
2011	AR Games	Nintendo 3DS	
2011	Kirby Mass Attack	Nintendo DS	
2011	Kirby's Return to Dream Land	Wii	
2012	Kirby's Dream Collection	Wii	
2014	Kirby: Triple Deluxe	Nintendo 3DS	
2014	Kirby Fighters Deluxe	Nintendo 3DS	
2014	Dedede's Drum Dash Deluxe	Nintendo 3DS	
2015	BoxBoy!	Nintendo 3DS	
2015	Kirby and the Rainbow Curse	Wii U	
2015	Picross 3D: Round 2	Nintendo 3DS	
2016	BoxBoxBoy!	Nintendo 3DS	
2016	Kirby: Planet Robobot	Nintendo 3DS	
2017	Bye-Bye BoxBoy!	Nintendo 3DS	
2017	Team Kirby Clash Deluxe	Nintendo 3DS	
2017	Kirby's Blowout Blast	Nintendo 3DS	
2017	Part Time UFO	iOS, Android, Nintendo Switch	
2017	Kirby Battle Royale	Nintendo 3DS	
2018	Kirby Star Allies	Nintendo Switch	
2019	BoxBoy! + BoxGirl!	Nintendo Switch	
2019	Super Kirby Clash (Note: Co-developed with Vanpool)	Nintendo Switch	
2019	Housuu de Shoubu! Kame Sanpo	iOS, Android	
2020	Kirby Fighters 2	Nintendo Switch	
2020	Part Time UFO	Nintendo Switch	
2022	Kirby and the Forgotten Land	Nintendo Switch, Nintendo Switch 2	
2022	Kirby's Dream Buffet	Nintendo Switch	
2023	Kirby's Return to Dream Land Deluxe	Nintendo Switch	
2025	Kirby and the Forgotten Land - Nintendo Switch 2 Edition + Star-Crossed World	Nintendo Switch 2	
2027	Kirby and the World Beyond	Nintendo Switch 2	

=== Cancelled games ===
- Kirby's Air Ride (Nintendo 64)
- EarthBound 64 (64DD, Nintendo 64)
- Kirby Tilt 'n' Tumble 2 (GameCube)
- Battland (Game Boy Advance)
- Luna Blaze (Game Boy Advance)
- Kirby for Nintendo GameCube (GameCube)

== Software ==
- MAX BASIC
- Mii Studio for Wii U
- Mini BASIC
- Music Composer
- Music Machine
- My Nintendo 3DS & Wii U Memories
- Nintendo 3DS Electronic Manual
- Nintendo 3DS Internet Browser
- Nintendo eShop (Nintendo Switch)
- Nintendo Switch Web Browser
- Nintendo Switch Mii creation and management software
- Sysdolphin
- TV no Tomo Channel
- Welwalk WW-2000 (user interface)
- Wii U Electronic Manual
- Wii U Internet Browser

== Hardware ==
- BoxBoy! amiibo series
- CAT trackball
- GSX-8800 sound board
- HAL Catch
- HALFAX-9600/9600EX
- HAL Mouse Pocket
- HALNote
- HALScan
- Hibiki FM tone generator and MIDI interface board
- JB King
- JB Turbo
- Joyball - MSX, NES
- Kirby amiibo series
- Kirby's Magic Tower of Medal Land
- Nintendo e-Reader
- PasocomMini MZ-80C
- PasocomMini PC-8001
- Programmable character generators - PCG-700, 1200, 6500, 8000, 8100, 8200, and 8800
- Pokémon Snap Seal print system
