= F1 Race =

1984 video game and sequels

- Famicom box art
- Developers: HAL Laboratory; Nintendo R&D1 (Game Boy)
- Publisher: Nintendo
- Producer: Masayuki Uemura
- Designer: Satoru Iwata
- Programmers: Satoru Iwata; Yasunari Soejima
- Composer: Hideki Kanazashi
- Platforms: Family Computer, Game Boy
- Release: Famicom: JP: November 2, 1984; Game Boy: JP: November 9, 1990; NA: February 3, 1991; EU: October 10, 1991
- Genre: Racing
- Modes: Single-player, multiplayer

F1 Race (Note: Japanese: F1レース, Hepburn: F1 Rēsu) is a racing video game developed by HAL Laboratory and published by Nintendo for the Famicom in 1984. It had two "Grand Prix" Famicom Disk System sequels and a Game Boy version.

== Gameplay ==
Player approaches a corner (original Famicom version)

The game features racing in one of two Formula One cars on a variety of tracks in landmark scenery. On Famicom, the cars come in three colors: red, light orange, and dark blue. It uses a faux 3D perspective view simulated using the Famicom's 2D tile-based graphics hardware. Cars and objects are rendered as 2D sprites using billboarding.

Famicom gameplay is similar to that of Namco's Pole Position. The player must finish 2 laps of each course within the time limit in order to progress to the next. Points are scored based on the distance the car travels, with the goal being to gain a high score. Vehicles in the game have a generic two-speed manual transmission governing their speed (with a "LOW" setting and a "HI" setting). A time extension is granted after completing the first lap of each course. The game has 3 skill levels, with each skill level having a set of 5 tracks, where the tracks in skill level 1 are the simplest, and the tracks in skill level 3 are the most complex. On the fifth track of each skill level, the race will never end, no matter how many laps the player completes, and the time extension granted with each lap completion diminishes, eventually forcing a game over. When the player's car come into contact with other cars racing on the track, or with objects off the side of the road, it will be destroyed and respawn, usually losing several seconds. Additionally, the player must be careful on bends, as if the car is going too fast, it will skid on them, forcing the car towards the outside of the bend and will potentially cause a crash or run off the road.

== Development and release ==
HAL Laboratory developed F1 Race, in a small team led by Satoru Iwata. Production began shortly after the completion of Golf, and lasted alongside several other Famicom games such as Pinball, Mach Rider, and Balloon Fight. In a 1999 interview with Used Games magazine, Iwata recalled production being a challenge, as the first Famicom game with raster scrolling, a feature not built into the system and so programmed from scratch. It was developed based on Iwata's personal love for racing games, which influenced later Nintendo projects such as the F-Zero and Mario Kart series. It was published by Nintendo and released in Japan on November 2, 1984.

== Reception ==
Reception

Review scores
Publication	Score
AllGame	2.5/5
Consoles Plus	95/100

GamesRadar ranked it the 49th best game on the Game Boy and Game Boy Color, calling it a "first-class racing game" and praising its wide appeal to racing fans.

== Sequels ==
F1 Race had two "Grand Prix" sequels for Nintendo's Famicom Disk System released only in Japan: Famicom Grand Prix: F-1 Race (1987) and Famicom Grand Prix II: 3D Hot Rally (1988). Later commentators have called them a precursor to the Mario Kart series (1992); Mario is on their cover and Grand Prix: F-1 Race even has duplicate images of Mario in the game, though the manual shows the enemy drivers are human. The Game Boy version, F-1 Race (1990), added new features.

=== Famicom Grand Prix: F-1 Race ===
Famicom Grand Prix: F-1 Race was developed by HAL Laboratory for the Famicom Disk System and released in 1987, only in Japan. It used an overhead 2D view instead of the faux 3D perspective view.

Players reportedly could insert their disk into kiosks at various Japanese stores to submit their best times.

=== Famicom Grand Prix II: 3D Hot Rally ===
Famicom Grand Prix II: 3D Hot Rally is faux 3D perspective stereoscopic racing video game developed by HAL Laboratory for the Famicom Disk System and published by Nintendo and released in April 14, 1988, only in Japan. It was used with 3D stereoscopic glasses paired with the Famicom 3D System accessory. It was the first game which Shigeru Miyamoto and Satoru Iwata worked on together.

=== Game Boy version ===
A Game Boy version of F1 Race (renamed to F-1 Race) was published in Japan on November 9, 1990, in North America on February 3, 1991, and in Europe on October 10 of the same year. It was developed by Nintendo Research & Development 1 (R&D1) and designed by Naotaka Onishi, with music by Ryo Yoshiyoshi Ninohe and programming by Kenji Imai. F-1 Race allows for four-person multiplayer via the Game Link Cable accessory.

Several Nintendo characters appear at the end of race tracks for the Game Boy version: Mario, Luigi, Princess Peach, Toad, Bowser, Link, Samus, Pit and Donkey Kong. The Game Boy version has different gameplay, with longer race tracks set in different countries and new driving mechanics, and different game modes. The player can activate a temporary speed boost by holding up on the D-pad, replacing the low-high gear setting from the Famicom version. Powersliding is activated by continuing to hold left or right at sharp corners. Unlike the Famicom version, colliding with other cars does not destroy the player's car and hitting an obstacle simply makes the car spin out.
