= Othello (1986 video game) =

- North American NES box art
- Developer: HAL Laboratory
- Publishers: Famicom Disk System; Kawada; NES: JP: Kawada; NA: Acclaim Entertainment; Game Boy: JP: Kawada; EU: Nintendo
- Producer: Satoru Iwata
- Programmer: T. Fuchi
- Artist: H. Naka
- Composer: Hideki Kanazashi
- Platforms: Famicom Disk System, NES, Game Boy
- Release: Famicom Disk System: JP: October 13, 1986; NES: JP: November 13, 1986; NA: December 1988; Game Boy: JP: February 9, 1990; EU: 1990
- Mode: Single-player

Othello (オセロ, Osero) is a 1986 strategy video game developed by HAL Laboratory for the Nintendo Entertainment System and Game Boy. It was published by the toy company Kawada in Japan and Acclaim Entertainment in North America. The Game Boy version was published by Nintendo in Europe. It is based on the board game Othello, a version of Reversi sold by Tsukuda Original. The video game is seen as a solid rendition of the board game with good controls but a lack of features.

== Gameplay ==
Othello is played with two-sided (black and white) chips, also called discs, on an 8 x 8 board. The player can choose between black or white chips. The goal is to end the game with as many chips showing your color as possible. To do this, players must sandwich their opponents' discs between two pieces of their own color, thereby swapping each of the sandwiched discs for one of their own.

Games are either one player against a computer or two player against another player. The game has four skill levels when playing the computer, as well as a hidden fifth level if you beat the computer on level four. Games can also be timed, with games ending after 20, 30, or 40 minutes.

== Release ==
Othello was originally released by Kawada, a Japanese toy company based out of Tokyo. The in-game credits attribute the game to HAL Laboratory, with the producer credit going to Satoru Iwata, the future president of Nintendo. It was first sold as a floppy disk on October 13, 1986 for the Famicom Disk System. A cartridge version was sold for the Family Computer on November 13, 1986. This cartridge was licensed to Acclaim Entertainment for sale in North America, who announced it for the Nintendo Entertainment System in October 1988. Acclaim CEO Greg Fischbach claimed the game was chosen to appeal to an older, more strategically minded audience "since the age of computer gamers is increasing as software improves." It released in December 1988. Kaneko released a version for the Game Boy in Japan on February 9, 1990. This version was also licensed to Nintendo for sale in PAL regions.

== Reception ==
Computer Entertainer called the NES version "addicting" and said it required "a good deal of thinking and strategy." VideoGames & Computer Entertainment called the controls "simple and easy to use", the ability to cancel moves "handy", and the game itself "deceptively simple". According to Brett Weiss, it is "a solid rendition of the classic board game" though he believed it would be improved by a beginner-friendly mode that displayed the possible moves and gave suggestions.

== See Also ==
- Computer Othello
- Dynasty!
- Othello (1981 video game)
- Othello Multivision
