= Hal's Hole in One Golf =

1991 video game

- North American box art
- Developer: HAL Laboratory
- Publisher: HAL Laboratory
- Designer: Takashi Saitou
- Programmer: Satoru Iwata
- Composer: Jun Ishikawa
- Series: Hole in One
- Platform: Super Nintendo Entertainment System
- Release: JP: 23 February 1991; NA: September 1991; EU: 22 October 1992
- Genre: Sports
- Modes: Single-player; Multiplayer

HAL's Hole in One Golf (Note: Japanese: ジャンボ尾崎のホールインワン, Hepburn: Jumbo Ozaki no Hole In One) is a golf video game developed and published by HAL Laboratory for the Super Nintendo Entertainment System in 1991.

== Summary ==
One of the courses in the game.

The game is essentially a standard 18-hole golf video game, which is played from a top-down perspective. Players can enter up to four characters (letters and numbers) for their name. Wind speeds are shown in meters per second. Water hazards notifications appear in big gray letters.

In addition to stroke and match play, players can obtain passwords that allow spectacular shots to be re-enacted as if they were the spectator (eagles, holes in one, and double eagles). Beginners can learn gameplay strategies from watching expert players while they use their hard-earned passwords. Mode 7 effects permits the usage of elevation in certain camera angles.

== Development ==
During the mid-1980s, various Hole in One video games were released in Japan by HAL Laboratory for the NEC PC88 and MSX. The Super Famicom version can be considered as the sequel to the Family Computer video game Jumbo Ozaki no Hole in One Professional released in 1988. The Japanese version was named after legendary Japanese golfer Jumbo Ozaki, who has played golf on a professional basis since 1973. Takashi Saitou designed the stages.

== Reception ==
Reception

Review scores
Publication	Score
ACE	867/1000
AllGame	3.5/5
Electronic Gaming Monthly	8/10, 8/10, 8/10, 7/10
Super Play	7/10
Total!	75%
Control	74%
Game Boy	3/5, 4/5, 4/5, 4/5
SNES Force	53%
Super Action	91%
The Super Famicom	78/100
Super Pro	55%

The Japanese publication Micom BASIC Magazine ranked Hal's Hole in One Golf tenth in popularity in its June 1991 issue. The game also garnered generally favorable reviews.
