= Fire Bam =

1988 video game

- Developers: HAL Laboratory; Live Planning
- Publisher: HAL Laboratory
- Platform: Famicom Disk System
- Release: JP: February 1, 1988
- Genre: Action role-playing

Fire Bam (Note: Japanese: ファイヤーバム, Hepburn: Faiyābamu) is an action role-playing video game developed by HAL Laboratory and Live Planning and published in 1988 by HAL Laboratory for the Famicom Disk System. It is an early example of a fast-paced action game.

== Gameplay ==
Fire Bam is an action role-playing video game. The game features side-scrolling areas similar to Zelda II: The Adventure of Link, where the player character Bam explores in order to save his parents, who have been turned into monsters. The player is equipped with a sword, which can be upgraded with bits of fire acquired by defeating monsters. The player can also equip shields and boots, which can also be upgraded with the fire. While exploring the overworld, the player can encounter dungeons, where the player runs to the right while fighting enemies in windy areas, before

== Reception ==
Reception

Review score
| Publication | Score |
|---|---|
| Famitsu | 4/10, 6/10, 7/10, 4/10 |

The game received lukewarm reviews from Famitsu writers, who noted its cute characters and gameplay similarities to Zelda II, but complained about its repetitiveness and lack of diversity of items. Some praised its fast-paced action, while others found it too fast.
