= Ninja-Kid II =

1987 video game

Ninja-kun - Ashura no Shou
- Arcade flyer
- Developers: UPL (Arcade); Opera House (MSX2)
- Publishers: Arcade: JP: UPL; NA: World Games (Rad Action); NA: United Amusements (JT-104); MSX: JP: HAL Laboratory
- Platforms: Arcade, Family Computer, MSX2
- Release: JP: April 1987
- Genre: Platform
- Modes: Single-player, multiplayer

Ninja-kun: Ashura no Shō (Note: Japanese: 忍者くん阿修羅ノ章, Hepburn: Ninja-kun: Ashura no Shō), released in North America as Rad Action and JT-104, is a 1987 platform video game developed and published by UPL for arcades. Released in April 1987, it is a direct sequel to the 1984 title, Ninja-Kid. Hamster Corporation acquired the rights to the game alongside UPL's intellectual property, releasing the game as part of their Arcade Archives series for the PlayStation 4 in 2015 and Nintendo Switch in 2018, as well as the NES version for their Console Archives series for the Nintendo Switch 2 and PlayStation 5 in March 2026 under the name Ninja-Kid II.

== Gameplay ==
Screenshot from the arcade version of Ninja-Kid.

The game improves on the gameplay of its predecessor alongside significantly more complicated and linear level design. The player can choose from three paths to progress in each level, allowing for different combinations of levels on every play through. In comparison to its predecessor, the titular ninja can crouch to descend levels, scale and wall-jump up walls, and prevent death by rolling after jumping from a great height.

== Reception ==
Game Machine listed Ninja-Kid II on their June 1, 1987 issue as being the tenth most-successful table arcade unit of the month.
