= Day Dreamin' Davey =

1992 video game

- Developers: Sculptured Software
- Publisher: HAL Laboratory
- Designers: Michael Mendheim; Hal Rushton
- Programmer: Ken Moore
- Artist: Les Pardew
- Composer: Paul Webb
- Platform: Nintendo Entertainment System
- Release: NA: June 1992
- Genre: Action-adventure
- Mode: Single-player

Day Dreamin' Davey is an action-adventure game developed by Sculptured Software and published by HAL Laboratory for the North American Nintendo Entertainment System in June 1992.

== Gameplay ==
Davey battles thieves in the medieval-themed level.

Day Dreamin' Davey incorporates elements of action, adventure, and role-playing genres, similar to The Legend of Zelda. The player controls Davey on a top-down perspective, moving up, down, left, and right on the screen.

It takes place on one day of Davey at school, which involves him going through seven daydreams of himself being in three historic locations: Ancient Greece, Middle Ages, and the Wild West, with stopovers in "Outer Worlds" such as Winterland, a quicksand area, and a "Cloud City", filled with the Titans along the way. Levels contain mazes and dead-ends. The game includes loose references to the Matter of Britain, Greek mythology, and the gunfight at the O.K. Corral; particularly Excalibur, Merlin, and the Cochise County Cowboys. During his journey, Davey encounters Greek deities, such as: Apollo, Artemis, Athena, Charon, and Hades; while fighting against the Cyclopes, Cerberus, and Medusa.

Throughout the game, Davey collects items garnered from roaming the level and defeating bosses, with the more powerful ones, including those that increase or drain Davey's life energy, more hidden or guarded by evil protectors. Among items that can decrease the life energy include peppermint found in the Old West and green apples in Greece.

He carries a main weapon triggered with the A button and secondary weapons and shields activated by pressing the B button; due to this, the player has to press A and B at the same time to jump, which is required for jumping over fences and rocks and attacking foes above ground. Some enemies can only be defeated with certain "special weapons", and it's up to the player to find clues about which weapons kill what enemies. Multiple weapons can be carried at a time, and the player can change them during level gameplay through a menu screen accessed by pressing select; the menu also shows items and special items that have been collected. The game can be continued with passwords.

== Reception ==
Reception

Review scores
Publication	Score
AllGame	2.5/5
Nintendo Power	3.25/5 (Note: Nintendo Power gave Day Dreamin' Davey two 3.2/5 scores for graphics/sound and challenge, a 2.9/5 rating for play control, and a 3.7/5 for theme/fun, over a year prior to the game's release.)
Game Players	5/10

Day Dreamin' Davey was released to little press coverage, with only a Nintendo Power guide for the first seven levels a year prior to the game's release and a mixed review published in Game Players; in it, Patrick Baggatta wrote that it had strategy-solving elements that made it interesting enough for young kids but also was too limited in locations used and was overly long to the point of turning an "original concept" "tiresome".

Mixed opinions continued in retrospective coverage of the game. In a review for Hardcore Gaming 101, Adrian Sandoval opined that despite "an imaginative high concept that allows for a variety of level settings and game mechanics," the "slapdash and sloppy" programming and design choices ruined it; these include the weapons not being cancelled if both A and B are pressed to jump, an awkward method of obtaining items from non-player characters, re-used stage layouts, and combat involving poor hit detection and unclear feedback. Andy Slaven, in his book the Video Game Bible, 1985–2002, opined the game consisted of "varied, yet boring levels", and Skyler Miller of AllGame wrote the game benefitted from a "cute" story with a like-able protagonist but suffered from "bland" gameplay consisting of "boring mazes", "generic enemies" and "poor controls".

In 2015, Paste ranked it the 16th best NES game to use the Zapper, where Garrett Martin labeled it a "decent little adventure". Something Awful's review of the game, which ranked it -39/-50, was a parody involving a fake conversation between the writer and Davey, ending with Davey dying a bloody death.
