= Revenge of the 'Gator =

1989 video game

- North American cover art
- Developer: HAL Laboratory
- Publisher: HAL Laboratory: EU: Nintendo
- Composer: Hiroaki Suga
- Platform: Game Boy
- Release: JP: October 18, 1989; NA/EU: March 1990
- Genre: Pinball
- Modes: Single-player, multiplayer

Revenge of the 'Gator, (Note: Known in Japan as Pinball: 66 Hiki no Wani Daikoushin (Japanese: ピンボール 66匹のワニ大行進, Hepburn: Pinbōru 66-biki no Wani Daikōshin; lit. Pinball: The Great 66-Alligator Parade)) known in Europe as Pinball: Revenge of the 'Gator, is a pinball video game developed and published by HAL Laboratory for the Game Boy. It was released in Japan in October 1989 and North America and Europe by Nintendo in March 1990. The objective of the game is to score as many points as possible without having the player's pinball eaten by the alligator.

== Gameplay ==
The player launches the ball from the Shooter Lane and uses flippers to hit the ball around screen hitting targets and rolling through lanes to score points. There are four modes of play in Revenge of the 'Gator; Gator mode allows multiplayer gameplay through alternating turns while Match Play allows actual multiplayer though the Game Link Cable; both have single-player modes. The Gator mode is a standard score-attack mode common to pinball, while Match Play involves players competing to knock their opponents' ball over their flippers.

== Reception ==
Reception

Review scores
| Publication | Score |
|---|---|
| Computer and Video Games | 93% |
| Electronic Gaming Monthly | 6/6/7/6 |
| Mean Machines Sega | 91% |

Revenge of the 'Gator received generally positive reception from video game critics.

Reviewing the 3DS version, Damien McFerran of Nintendo Life gave the game 7 out of 10, and summarized: "Revenge of the 'Gator may lack the refinements showcased by modern pinball games, but that doesn't mean it should be ignored if you're a fan of the genre. The simplistic nature of the tables means you can give high-score chasing your full, undivided attention without being waylaid by distractions, and the ball physics are respectable enough to ensure you don't lose any games through anything but your own fault. HAL's effort may have been improved upon in recent years, but it's still an appealing and addictive pinball outing."

== Legacy ==
Revenge of the 'Gator was re-released (with Match Play disabled) for the Nintendo 3DS Virtual Console on January 9, 2013, in Japan, September 5, 2013, in Europe and on October 17, 2013, in North America. The game was re-released again as part of the Nintendo Classics line on October 27, 2026.

A ROM hack, Revenge of the 'Gator Gold, was released in 2023. It adds colors to the game, removes slowdown, allows high scores to be saved between sessions, and fixes various bugs.
