= Radar Rat Race =

1981 video game

- Developer: HAL Laboratory
- Publisher: Commodore
- Designer: HAL Laboratory
- Platforms: VIC-20, MAX Machine, Commodore 64
- Release: 1981
- Genres: Maze
- Mode: Single-player

Radar Rat Race (レーダーラットレース, Rēdā Ratto Rēsu) is a video game developed by HAL Laboratory released on cartridge in 1981 as a launch title for the VIC-20. The game is a clone of Namco's Rally-X arcade video game and was released in Japan as Rally-X (ラリーX) from Commodore Japan K.K. In 1982, ports were released for the MAX Machine and Commodore 64.

== Gameplay ==
The player guides a mouse through a large maze. The camera follows the mouse and shows only a small portion of the maze at any given time. The player is pursued by at least three rats. The goal is to eat all of the pieces of cheese, shown for the entire maze on a radar screen, without getting caught by a rat or bumping into a stationary cat. By pressing the joystick button, the mouse can disperse a limited amount of magical dust (called "star screen") which confuses the rats for about five seconds. Once the round is complete, the game starts again, with more rats and faster play. The gameplay is accompanied by a frenetic, rhythmically altered version of a phrase from "Three Blind Mice", which cycles endlessly.

== Reception ==
Computer and Video Games, although criticizing the game's controls and repetitive sound, called the Commodore 64 version "quite exciting and amusing to play".
