= Jupiter Lander =

1981 video game

- Developer: Hitoshi Suzuki (鈴木仁志)/HAL Laboratory
- Publisher: Commodore
- Platforms: VIC-20, Commodore 64, PC-8001, PasocomMini PC-8001
- Release: 1981: VIC-20; 1981: PC-8001; 1982: C64; 2019: PasocomMini PC-8001

Jupiter Lander is a lunar lander game developed by HAL Laboratory and published by Commodore in 1981 for the VIC-20. In 1982, it was an early release for the new Commodore 64. In 2019, it was also included in Pasocom Mini PC-8001 released by HAL Laboratory.

== Reception ==
Harvey B. Herman for Compute! said "An old fogey, like me, enjoyed it, but found it almost impossible to land on more difficult sites. The kids found it challenging but learned how to do it almost every time."

Henry Cohen for Electronic Games said "Jupiter Lander is a high-resolution, full-color "kissin cousin" to the familiar arcade Lunar Lander."

Michael Blanchet for Electronic Fun with Computers & Games said "this is one of those games that is very satisfying once you've mastered it".

David Busch for Creative Computing said "What makes the Jupiter Lander game challenging is the speed readout at the side of the screen, showing speed in meters per second."
