= Golf (1984 video game) =

1984 video game

- North American NES box art
- Developers: Nintendo R&D2; HAL Laboratory
- Publisher: Nintendo
- Director: Kenji Miki
- Producer: Masayuki Uemura
- Designers: Kenji Miki; Shigeru Miyamoto
- Programmer: Satoru Iwata
- Artist: Shigeru Miyamoto
- Composer: Koji Kondo
- Platforms: NES, arcade, PC-88, Sharp X1, PC-8001mkIISR, PC-98, Famicom Disk System, Game Boy, Nintendo e-Reader
- Release: May 1, 1984: NES; JP: May 1, 1984; NA: October 18, 1985; EU: November 15, 1986 Arcade (VS. System); JP: July 26, 1984; NA: October 1984; EU: 1985 Arcade (Ladies Golf); NA: December 14, 1984 Famicom Disk System; JP: February 21, 1986 Game Boy; JP: November 28, 1989; NA: February 1990; EU: 1990 e-Reader; NA: April 21, 2003
- Genre: Sports (golf)
- Modes: Single-player, multiplayer
- Arcade system: Nintendo VS. System, PlayChoice-10

Golf (Note: Japanese: ゴルフ, Hepburn: Gorufu) is a golf video game developed by Nintendo and HAL Laboratory and published by Nintendo for the Nintendo Entertainment System. It was originally released for the Famicom in Japan in 1984, with a port to the Nintendo VS. System as VS. Golf or Stroke and Match Golf, released in arcades internationally, followed by another arcade version called VS. Ladies Golf. The original was re-released for the NES in North America in 1985, and for the Famicom Disk System in 1986 in Japan.

Golf became the best-selling sports game for the NES/Famicom, and was re-released for different Nintendo consoles over several years. It was hidden in the Nintendo Switch firmware as an Easter egg as a tribute to the game's programmer, the late Satoru Iwata.

== Gameplay ==
The main player wears a white shirt and shoes with blue pants and uses a white ball, while the second player wears a red shirt and shoes with black pants and uses a red ball. The player selects either single stroke play or the two-player selections of doubles stroke play or match play. The player is then placed at the tee of the first of 18 holes.

In 1991, Nintendo identified the golfer as Mario in a gameplay guide book. Nintendo's Wii game Captain Rainbow identifies the golfer as Ossan, which happens to be one of the generic hero names during the development of Donkey Kong. The Game Boy conversion would feature Mario on the Western cover art, but not the Japanese version.

== Development and release ==
In 1983, the Famicom had only three launch games, and its library would soon total seven, including Golf. Shigeru Miyamoto said he was "directly in charge of the character design and the game design", and Satoru Iwata said he was the only programmer.

Golf has been re-released on many other consoles after its release. Hudson Soft released a conversion of the game for the Japan-only PC-88 and Sharp X1 in 1985. Golf was released for the Japan-only Family Computer Disk System on February 21, 1986. It was re-released for the Nintendo e-Reader for the Game Boy Advance on April 21, 2003. Both the NES and Game Boy versions were released on the Virtual Console for Wii U and Nintendo 3DS. It was re-released on the Nintendo Switch via Nintendo eShop on October 25, 2019, by Hamster Corporation as part of its Arcade Archives series.

Golf can be unlocked in the 2001 video games Dōbutsu no Mori for Nintendo 64 and Animal Crossing for GameCube. The latter supports Advance Play using a GameCube – Game Boy Advance link cable, allowing Golf to be played on a Game Boy Advance.

The game is a hidden Easter egg in the pre-4.0 firmware of the Nintendo Switch, in tribute to Satoru Iwata, who was the sole programmer of Golf (as one of his first projects for Nintendo) and later became Nintendo's CEO. It can be accessed on the Switch home menu if the system clock is set to the July 11 memorial of Iwata's death, and then the user moves Joy-Con controllers to imitate the "Direct" hand gesture that Iwata popularized during his tenure as main host of Nintendo Direct presentations. This version exclusively has the option for motion controls.

== Reception ==
Reception

Review scores
Publication	Score
AllGame	GB: 4/5
Electronic Gaming Monthly	GB: 7/10, 8/10, 7/10, 8/10
Computer Gamer	ARC: Positive

Golf was successful during its initial release, with positive reviews from critics and was the tenth best-selling game released on the system. Sales were numbered at over 4 million copies in total, with the Famicom version alone yielding 2.46 million copies sold in Japan.

Golf's 1989 port on the Game Boy received a positive review from AllGame, who rated the Game Boy version with 4 out of 5 stars.

== Legacy ==
Golf is the first golf video game to feature a power and accuracy bar for swinging the club, which has been used in most golf games since.

Three-dimensional versions of Golf's courses appear in the nine holes of Wii Sports, the "Classic" courses in Wii Sports Resort, and in Clubhouse Games: 51 Worldwide Classics.

The player-controlled character Ossan appeared in the 2008 Wii game Captain Rainbow where he is portrayed as a smelly middle-aged man who is terrible at golf. Players must find his lost golf club as well as help him play well again.

Hamster Corporation released the arcade version as part of their Arcade Archives series for the Nintendo Switch on October 25, 2019.
