= Mole Attack =

1981 video game

- Developer: HAL Laboratory
- Publishers: Commodore (VIC); HAL Laboratory (PC-88)
- Release: 1981
- Modes: VIC-20, PC-88

Mole Attack is a video game clone of the mechanical arcade game Whac-A-Mole. It was published by Commodore International in 1981 for the VIC-20. HAL Laboratory later published a version for the PC-8001.

== Gameplay ==
Mole Attack is a game in which moles pop up from nine holes, and the player has 60 seconds to send them back underground by bopping them on the head with a hammer, which is controlled with the joystick or the keyboard.

== Reception ==
In a 1983 review for Electronic Games, Charlene Komar commented, "Mole Attack will probably be a favorite among younger arcaders. Even though the eye-catching graphics combine well with the time-limit excitement, adults will probably find the game too simple and repetitive to get too many repeat plays."
