= Kick (video game) =

1981 video game

Kick / Kick Man
- The C64 port uses an alternate spelling.
- Developer: Midway
- Publishers: Midway (arcade); Commodore (C64)
- Designer: John Pasierb
- Composer: Earl Vickers
- Platforms: Arcade, Commodore 64
- Release: NA: December 1981; 1982: C64
- Genre: Action
- Mode: Single-player
- Arcade system: Midway MCR-I

Kick is an action video game where the player controls a clown on a unicycle catching falling balloons and Pac-Man characters on the clown's hat. It was released in arcades by Midway in 1981. The game was later renamed Kick Man (sometimes written as Kick-Man). Commodore published a Commodore 64 port in 1982 without the space in the title as Kickman.

== Gameplay ==
The player controls a clown on a unicycle who moves left and right along the bottom of the screen. Balloons dislodge from several rows at the top and fall. The goal is to catch them on the clown's hat. As the stack of caught balloons grows taller, it becomes more difficult to catch them on the first try. If a balloon falls below the top of the stack, pressing the "kick" button when near the clown's feet launches it back into the air. The main character and ghosts from Pac-Man sometimes stand-in for balloons, having different effects. If an object hits the ground, then the player loses a life.

Kick also has a bonus stage.

== Development ==
The development of Kick was described in a 1982 Time magazine article. The game started out as a 1978 black-and-white prototype called Catch 40, where a little man ran back and forth trying to catch falling objects on his head. However, early tests showed that the game grew too difficult too quickly, as the objects fell faster than the player could catch them. The game then went through a period of stagnation.

Eventually, the little man character was redesigned as a clown on a unicycle. Hank Ross, one of Midway's founders, introduced a mechanic where the clown could kick missed balloons back into the air. The stages were also differentiated: on the first rack, the clown could pop balloons with a spike on his hat, whereas on subsequent levels, balloons would accumulate on his head, reducing the distance they needed to fall and increasing the game's speed. Additionally, hazardous objects thrown at the player character were added: these were initially anvils, but as the idea of thrown anvils was deemed unrealistic, they were replaced with bombs. According to the Time article, in later stages the balloons would be replaced by other falling objects such as flowers, hats and beach balls (however, these objects do not actually appear in the final game). At Hank Ross's suggestion, the characters from Pac-Man were added as collectable objects in the game, to give Kick a memorable quirk.

A sneak preview at a local arcade indicated that the game took too long to play and did not generate sufficient revenue. To remedy this, the development team slightly increased the fall speed of the balloons.

== Ports ==
In 1982, an Atari 2600 version of the game was commissioned by Midway as part of a planned attempt at entering the home video game market. Ultimately deciding against it, Midway sold the port to CBS Electronics, where, despite being nearly complete, it was cancelled for unknown reasons. In 2019, a prototype cartridge was discovered and the ROM was released online.

== Reception ==
Electronic Games wrote in 1983 that the game had been unsuccessful despite "top-notch background graphics and special sounds for effects. Can you imagine a game featuring Pac-Man that didn't make it? Kick Man is it." The Commodore 64 version was somewhat better received, gaining a Certificate of Merit in the category of "1984 Best Arcade-to-Home Video Game/Computer Game Translation" at the 5th annual Arkie Awards.

== Legacy ==
Utopia Software published a clone called Pinhead for Atari 8-bit computers in 1982.
