= VIC Avenger =

- Developer: Commodore
- Publisher: Commodore
- Platforms: VIC-20, Commodore 64
- Release: 1981: VIC-20; 1982: C64
- Genre: Fixed shooter
- Mode: Single-player

VIC Avenger is an unauthorized clone of Taito's Space Invaders published on ROM cartridge by Commodore in 1981 for its VIC-20 home computer. The game uses multicolor graphics and supports keyboard or joystick control. The player starts with three bases (lives) and gets a new base at 1500 points.

In 1982, a version for the Commodore 64 was published as Avenger.

== Reception ==
In Creative Computing, David Busch wrote, "Those who have played hundreds of games of Space Invaders on many different computer systems will probably tire of this rather quickly."

Reviewing the German release under "Alpha-Alarm" title, TeleMatch magazine compared the gameplay with Space Invaders from Atari as easy and not so thoughtful.
