= Satoru Iwata =

Japanese video game executive (1959–2015)

- 岩田 聡
- Iwata in 2011

4th President of Nintendo
- In office May 24, 2002 – July 11, 2015
- Preceded by: Hiroshi Yamauchi
- Succeeded by: Tatsumi Kimishima

CEO of Nintendo of America
- In office April 24, 2013 – July 11, 2015
- Preceded by: Tatsumi Kimishima

Personal details
- Born: December 6, 1959 Sapporo, Hokkaido, Japan
- Died: July 11, 2015 (aged 55) Kyoto, Japan
- Spouse: Kayoko Iwata
- Education: Tokyo Institute of Technology

Satoru Iwata (Japanese: 岩田 聡; December 6, 1959 – July 11, 2015) was a Japanese businessman, video game programmer and producer. Beginning in 2002, Iwata served as the fourth president of Nintendo, as well as the chief executive officer (CEO) of Nintendo of America from 2013 until his death in 2015. Iwata was a major contributor in broadening the appeal of video games by focusing on novel and entertaining games rather than top-of-the-line hardware. Iwata was the first president of Nintendo to be unrelated to the founder, Fusajiro Yamauchi.

Born in Sapporo, Iwata expressed interest in video games from an early age and created his first simple game while in high school. He majored in computer science at the Tokyo Institute of Technology. In 1980, he joined the game developer HAL Laboratory while attending the university. At HAL, he worked as a programmer and closely collaborated with Nintendo, producing his first commercial game in 1983. Games to which he contributed include EarthBound and many games in the Kirby series. Following a downturn and near-bankruptcy, Iwata became the president of HAL in 1993 at the insistence of Nintendo president Hiroshi Yamauchi and brought financial stability. In the following years, he worked in the development of the Pokémon and Super Smash Bros. series. Iwata joined Nintendo as the head of its corporate planning division in 2000.

Nintendo saw growth under Iwata and, when Yamauchi retired, he was sworn in as the company's president in May 2002. Under Iwata's leadership, Nintendo developed the Nintendo DS and Wii game consoles, helping the company achieve massive financial success. As a self-declared gamer, he focused on expanding the appeal of video games across demographics through a "blue ocean" business strategy. Nintendo attained record profits by 2009, and Barron's placed Iwata among the top 30 CEOs worldwide. Iwata expanded his strategy by defining a quality-of-life product line for the Wii that evolved into a ten-year strategy to create standalone products. Later hardware such as the Nintendo 3DS and Wii U proved far less profitable than the Wii, and Nintendo's net sales fell by two thirds from 2009 to 2012; the company saw its first operating losses in 30 years during this time. Iwata voluntarily halved his salary in 2011 and again in 2014. In 2015, after several years of decline, Iwata put a portion of Nintendo's focus into the rapidly growing mobile game market; a landmark partnership with mobile provider DeNA was established that March. Throughout his career, Iwata built a relationship with Nintendo fans through social media and his regular appearances in Iwata Asks and Nintendo Direct, becoming the public face of the company.

In June 2014, a tumor in Iwata's bile duct was discovered during a routine physical exam. It was removed, and Iwata returned to work in October of that year. The problem resurfaced in 2015, and Iwata died at the age of 55 from its complications on July 11. Members of the gaming industry and gamers worldwide alike offered tributes through public announcements and social media, and fans worldwide established temporary memorials. Iwata was posthumously awarded the Lifetime Achievement Award at the 2015 Golden Joystick Awards and the 2016 D.I.C.E. Awards.

== Early life ==
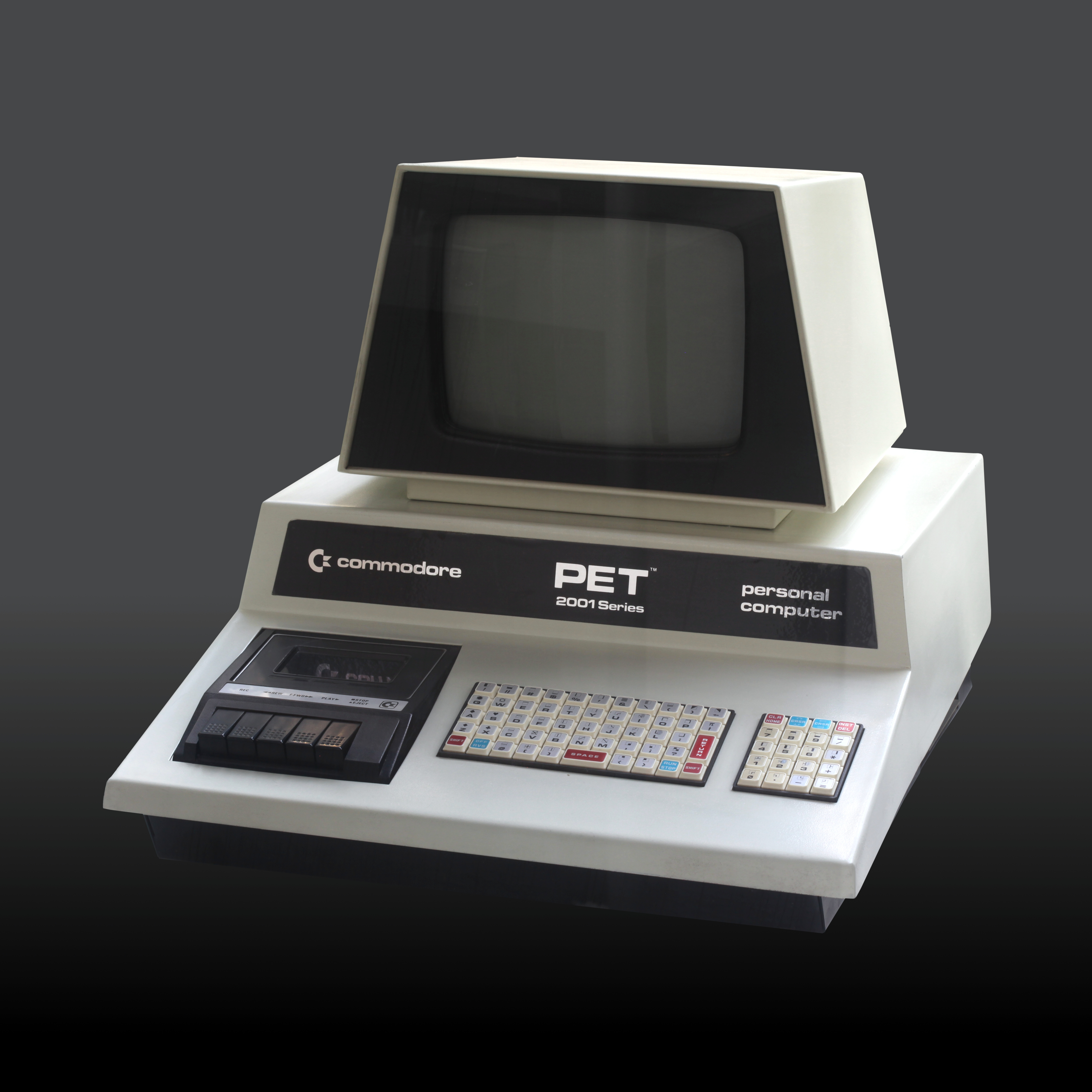
A Commodore PET 2001, the same model series Iwata purchased in 1978 and subsequently dismantled

Satoru Iwata was born on December 6, 1959, and raised in Sapporo, Japan, where his father served as a prefectural official. Throughout middle and high school, Iwata displayed leadership skills through service as class president, student council president, and club president at various times. His first experience with computers was in middle school with a demo computer that used telephone lines. Iwata would frequent the Sapporo subway and play a simple numeric game, called Game 31, until he mastered it. With money saved up from a dish-washing job and some additional allowance from his father, Iwata purchased an HP-65, the first programmable calculator, in 1974. After entering Hokkaido Sapporo South High School in April 1975, he began developing his own games during his junior year. The several simple number games Iwata produced, such as Volleyball and Missile Attack, made use of an electronic calculator he shared with his schoolmates.

He obtained his first computer, a Commodore PET, in 1978. He dismantled and studied the machine out of his desire to understand it. The computer coincidentally had a central processing unit (MOS 6502) similar to the one used by Nintendo for the Nintendo Entertainment System (NES), a gaming console for which he would later develop games. Following high school, Iwata was admitted to the Tokyo Institute of Technology in April 1978, where he majored in computer science. Tomohiko Uematsu, an engineering professor, noted Iwata's proficiency with software programming and remarked that Iwata could write programs faster and more accurately than any of his other students.

While attending the school, he was one of several unpaid interns at Commodore Japan, assisting the subsidiary's head engineer—Yash Terakura—with technical and software-development tasks. One of his main reasons for taking the job was to spend more time around computers and learn of details not openly available to the public. Terakura would later serve as a mentor to Iwata, teaching him about hardware engineering to supplement Iwata's already extensive software knowledge. Iwata and several of his friends rented an apartment in Akihabara and soon formed a club where they would create and code games. Classmates living in nearby apartments referred to Iwata's room as "Game Center Iwata". He would frequently show off his games to the Seibu department store's computer department, and by 1980 a group of employees there invited him to join their company, HAL Laboratory, Inc.

== HAL Laboratory ==
While attending university, Iwata worked for HAL Laboratory as a part-time programmer in 1980. Among their first creations was a peripheral device that enabled older computers to display graphics for video games. With this device, Iwata and members of HAL created multiple games that were "straight rip-offs of Namco's Rally-X, Galaxian, and others". HAL became the first company to establish a license with Namco for developing games. He joined the company in a full-time capacity after graduating in 1982, becoming its fifth employee and only programmer. Around the same time, Iwata's father was elected mayor of Muroran. Despite his passion, Iwata's family did not approve of his career choice, and his father did not talk with him for six months after Iwata joined HAL.

Iwata became the company's coordinator of software production in 1983, the time during which he helped HAL create a relationship with Nintendo so they would be able to produce games for its newly released Nintendo Entertainment System. He traveled to Kyoto himself to request permission to work on games for the NES, to which Nintendo obliged. His first commercially published game was Joust for the NES—a port of the 1982 arcade game. Other video games he worked on were Balloon Fight, NES Open Tournament Golf, EarthBound, and the Kirby games. Nintendo initially contacted several other developers to produce Open Tournament Golf; however, all of them declined as they did not believe the large amount of data could be stored within an NES cartridge. Iwata seized this opportunity and "recklessly" stepped up to develop the game. It proved particularly taxing as Iwata had to create his own data compression method in order to fit all 18 courses into the game. Similarly, HAL had to program parallax scrolling for F-1 Race as the NES hardware did not initially support it.

Iwata's proficiency with programming quickly placed him in high esteem among fellow programmers and gamers alike. He would often continue to work on weekends and holidays because of his passion. With the company on the verge of bankruptcy, Iwata was promoted to president of HAL in 1993 at the insistence of Nintendo's then-President, Hiroshi Yamauchi. With assistance from Nintendo, Iwata helped turn the company around from its ¥1.5 billion debt and stabilize its finances within six years. Lacking experience in management, Iwata put a lot of effort into learning how to better himself, often reading books on the topic and seeking advice from others.

Although he was not part of Nintendo at the time, Iwata assisted in the development of Pokémon Gold and Silver, which were released for the Game Boy Color in November 1999, by creating a set of compression tools utilized for graphics in the games. While working as a go-between for Game Freak and Nintendo, he aided in the programming of Pokémon Stadium for the Nintendo 64 by reading the original coding in Pokémon Red and Green and porting the battle system into the new game in just one week. According to Tsunekazu Ishihara, the president of The Pokémon Company, Iwata was instrumental in bringing Pokémon to Western markets. While being president of HAL, he developed the plan for localization after reviewing the code for Red and Green, which was then completed by Teruki Murakawa, with Western releases coming two years after their Japanese release. Additionally, he assisted Masahiro Sakurai in the development of Super Smash Bros. for the Nintendo 64.

== Nintendo ==
=== Early years (2000–2002) ===
In 2000, Iwata joined Nintendo as the head of its corporate planning division and took a seat on the board of directors. Over the next two years, he sought to reduce the cost and length of game development while preserving quality. During his first two years at Nintendo, the company saw profit increases of 20 and 41 percent, values which were at least partially attributable to his work. When Yamauchi, the company's president since 1949, retired on May 24, 2002, Iwata succeeded as Nintendo's fourth president with Yamauchi's blessing. He was the first Nintendo president unrelated to the Yamauchi family through blood or marriage since its founding in 1889. Yamauchi left the company in Iwata's hands with a final request: "that Nintendo give birth to wholly new ideas and create hardware which reflects that ideal. And make software that adheres to that same standard." Iwata inherited a company that promoted individualism, with a policy established by Yamauchi to create new development positions as needed. However, this inhibited efficient collaboration between certain departments.

At the time of Iwata's inauguration as president and CEO of the company, Nintendo, though still a profitable company, was not performing as well as other console makers. The recently released GameCube was performing poorly compared to competitors, with Sony's PlayStation 2 and Microsoft's Xbox outselling it. His presidency also came at the onset of the popularization of online gaming, and Nintendo had yet to move into this facet of the market. He took a cautious approach to the issue, stating: "We're not negative toward the idea of going online. We're just practical." He also fostered a relationship between Nintendo and Capcom that improved the GameCube's appeal. During an interview in 2002, Iwata stated that he felt the gaming industry was becoming too exclusive, and he wanted to develop hardware and games that would appeal to all players rather than focusing on top of the line graphics.

One of his first actions as president was to meet directly with the company's 40 department heads and 150 other employees. This contrasted starkly with Yamauchi's practice of rarely meeting with employees and generally having a single, annual speech. Shigeru Miyamoto described the previous business atmosphere as "stuffy" and stated Iwata "improved the ventilation". Iwata was acutely aware that his position as president would not ensure compliance from his employees and sought to communicate with them on a personal level. If employees disagreed with his view, Iwata would suggest they follow their idea instead of his own, stating "creators only improve themselves by taking risks". Alongside the increased level of interaction, Iwata also brought more data and science into the business aspect of the company. Whereas Yamauchi made decisions based on intuition and experience, Iwata brought forth hypotheses loaded with data to convey his position. Iwata also promoted Miyamoto, Genyo Takeda, Yoshihiro Mori, and Shinji Hatano to representative directors on the company's board of directors, equaling his own position.

=== Revitalization of the company (2003–2009) ===
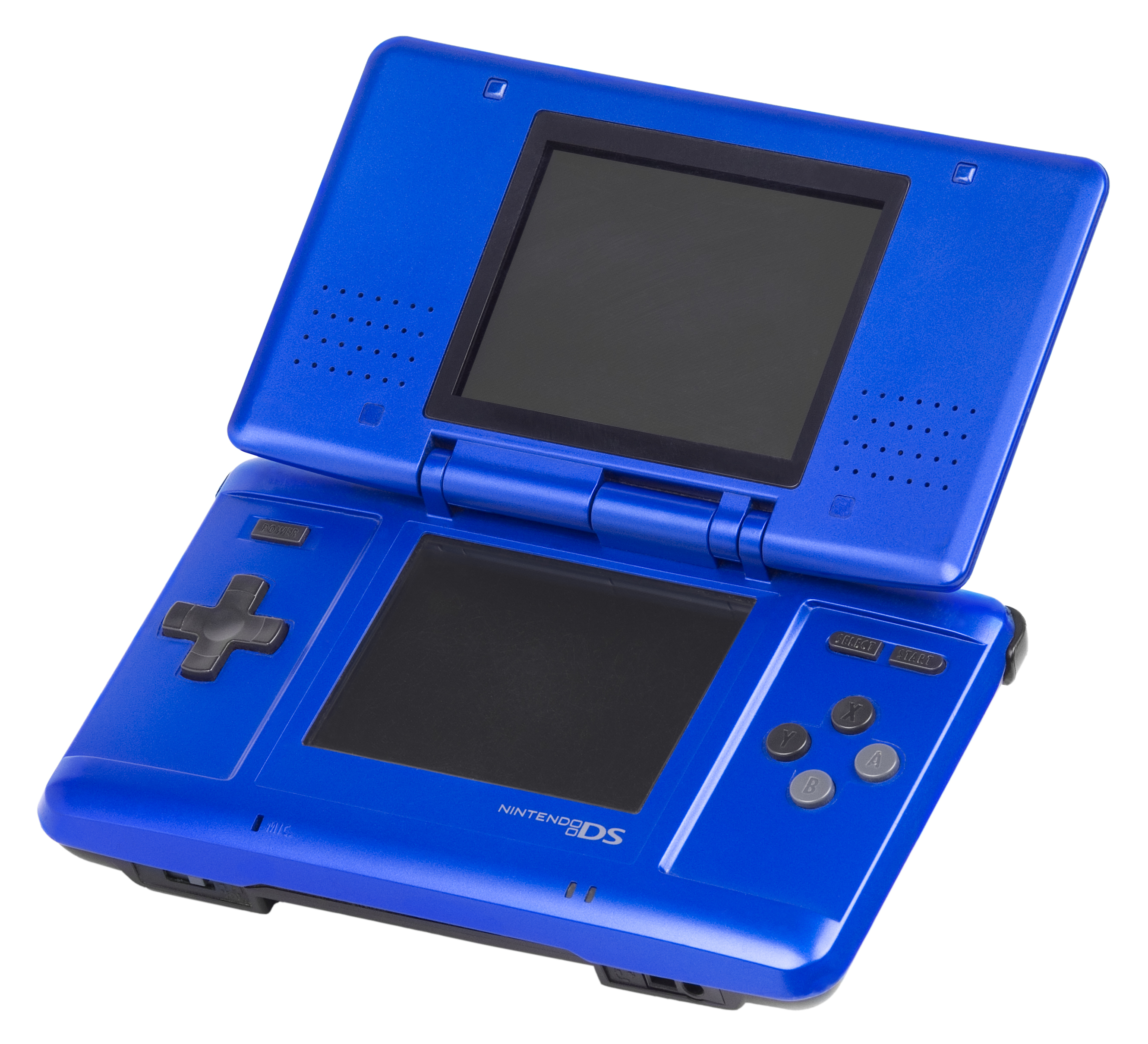
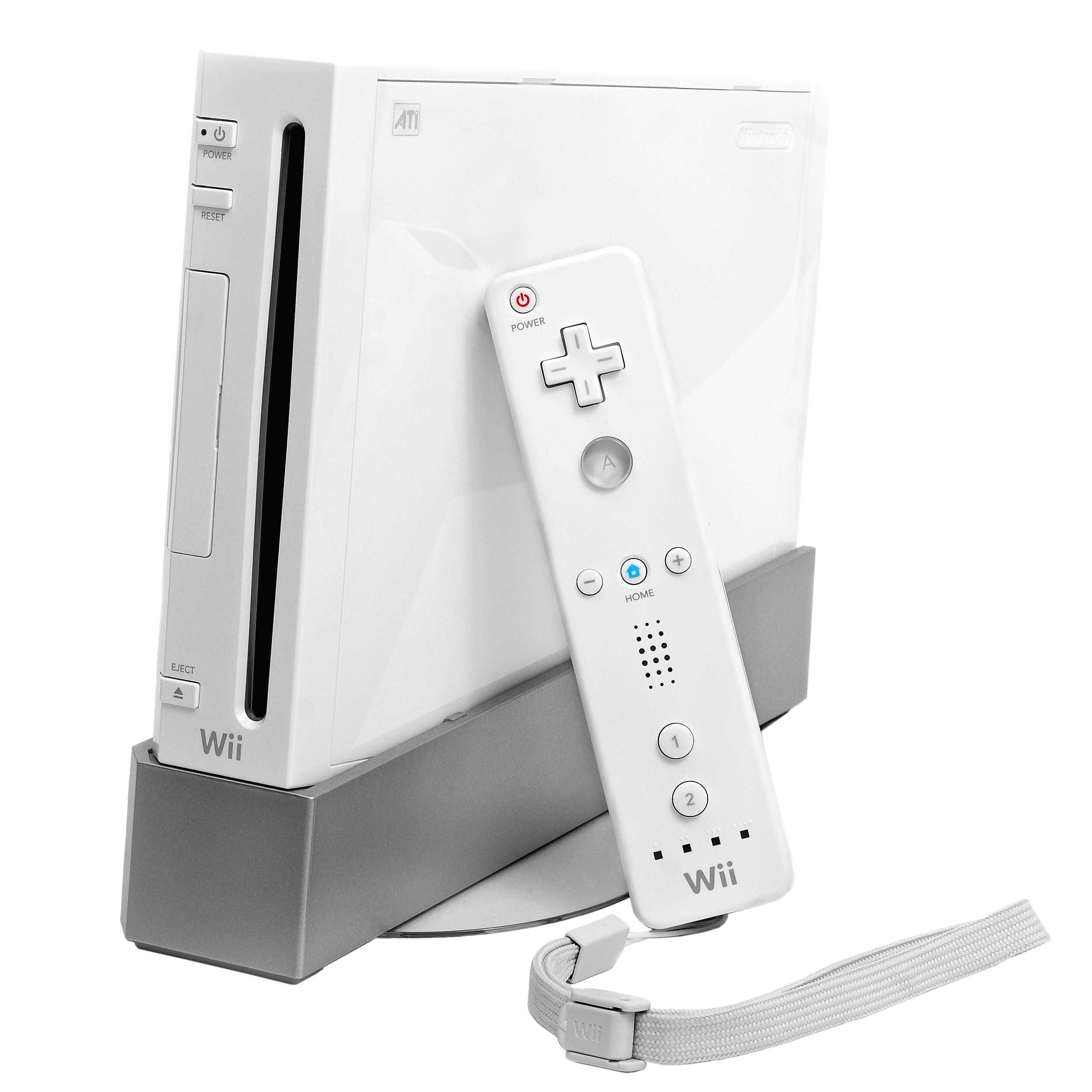
Iwata directed Nintendo to produce the Nintendo DS (left) and Wii (right) units, which proved financially successful for the company.

Following up on his 2002 interview, Iwata highlighted an urgency in the gaming market in his keynote speech at the 2003 Tokyo Game Show. During this speech, he reflected on the history of the industry and concluded with the declining interest in video games. A slump in sales in the Japanese market had begun at the end of the 1990s and continued into the early 2000s. Competition between Nintendo and Sony resulted in increasingly hardware-heavy consoles; however, the Nintendo 64 proved to be too cumbersome for developers and software suffered severely. After a year-long analysis conducted at Iwata's behest, Nintendo concluded that pushing hardware was not the most effective way to promote video games and decided to focus on software. A major internal reorganization of Nintendo took place in 2004, with Iwata consolidating various departments established under Yamauchi. He sought to promote collaborative work throughout the company. He later established a "User Expansion Project" in 2005 whereby employees normally not associated with game development would submit ideas for new games.

In a March 2004 interview, Iwata stated: "Games have come to a dead end." He stressed that developers wasted far too much time focusing on core gamers and would be unable to turn a profit if they did not tend to the average game player. Furthermore, he wished to prove that Nintendo, considered a "conservative" company at the time, would become a forefront innovator of entertainment. Iwata articulated a "blue ocean" strategy to help Nintendo successfully compete against the other console manufacturers. Instead of competing on technical specifications, Iwata drew on his previous experience as a game developer to produce novel and entertaining hardware and games.

==== Nintendo DS ====
Iwata helped lead a revitalization of Nintendo's handheld business by transitioning the company from the Game Boy Advance to the Nintendo DS, which sported a unique form factor and inclusion of a touchscreen that allowed for novel games. The idea for using two screens on a single device originated with Yamauchi before his retirement, while Miyamoto suggested the use of a touchscreen. Miyamoto subsequently spearheaded development of the device and its prototypes. The Nintendo DS proved to be a highly profitable system and went on to become the second-best selling video game console of all time with more than 154 million units, inclusive of subsequent iterations, sold by September 2014. In June 2004, Iwata sought a conference with Dr. Ryuta Kawashima about a game that could appeal to non-gamers. This project would later become Brain Age: Train Your Brain in Minutes a Day!, released in May 2005. Iwata personally oversaw development of the Brain Age series, even forgoing a public appearance on the day of the Nintendo DS's release in Japan on December 2. Miyamoto supported Iwata's work with the series and sent one of his protégés, Kouichi Kawamoto, to help develop the game. The Brain Age series is partially credited with launching the popularity of the Nintendo DS, and the series as a whole sold over 30 million copies by December 2008.

Iwata speaking at E3 2006

Subsequent iterations of the Nintendo DS, the DS Lite and DSi, also saw positive sales. The DS Lite improved upon the original DS, featuring brighter screens and a slimmer design in accordance with consumer demand. Released in March 2006 in Japan and three months later worldwide, the DS Lite ultimately sold nearly 94 million units. Statistics showed that households often shared a single DS, and Iwata sought to expand this from one per household to one per person. The console's third iteration, the DSi, embodies this idea with the "i" representing a single person. Despite concerns that the video game market was already over saturated by the DS and DS Lite, Iwata was confident that the DSi would sell, especially in European markets. The DSi built upon the success of the DS Lite by similarly meeting consumer demand. In addition to being slimmed further, the DSi featured two cameras, SD card support, an audio reader, and the "Nintendo DSi Shop". The relatively quick succession of the DS Lite and DSi broke the conventional pattern for release of game systems, each being released roughly 18 months apart instead of 5 years. Iwata saw the gradual price drop in the five-year cycle as a way of indirectly telling consumers to wait to purchase products and a punishment for those who bought it at launch. He sought to alleviate this issue with the quick releases.

==== Wii ====
Video games are meant to be just one thing: fun. Fun for everyone.

— Satoru Iwata

Discussions between Iwata, Miyamoto, and Takeda about a new home console began in the first half of 2003. With encouragement from Yamauchi, Iwata pushed for development of a revolutionary product that would later become the Wii. Iwata subsequently assigned Takeda to the project, "telling [Takeda] to go off the tech roadmap". The overall premise was that "a Mom has to like it". During the console's development process Iwata challenged engineers to make the Wii no thicker than three DVD cases stacked together, a feat they ultimately accomplished. Takeda and his team focused on reducing power consumption while retaining or improving levels of performance shown with the GameCube. Alongside the internal hardware designed by Nintendo's engineers, Iwata proposed that the console would abandon the use of a typical controller to make gaming more accessible to everyone. Miyamoto took the lead on developing a new controller while Takeda's team provided the internal components. After six months and dozens of scrapped prototypes, Takeda procured a CMOS sensor that later became the core aspect of the remote. With the addition of accelerometers, they were able to effectively produce motion controls.

Initially codenamed "Revolution" during a teaser at E3 2004, following Iwata's goal of creating a gaming revolution, Iwata publicly revealed the Wii at E3 2005, holding it above his head to emphasize its small size and lightweight design. Reveal of the Wii's signature Wii Remote controller was withheld until the Tokyo Game Show in September 2005. During his speech at the conference, Iwata reiterated his stance on growing the gaming market but expanded upon it by emphasizing the need to make controls less complicated. The controller's remote control design partially stemmed from Iwata's desire to have a device that was "immediately accessible" to all. He also insisted that the Wii Remote be referred to as simply a "remote" rather than a controller to emphasize its accessibility to anyone.

The Wii ultimately popularized the use of motion control-based video games and proved highly successful for Nintendo, helping to nearly double the company's stock price. Tapping into the market of casual players, the Wii marked "a breakthrough moment in the history of video games": a new genre of gaming was established for the family market. Iwata's former experience as a programmer, a rarity for technology CEOs, was said to help contribute towards his leadership of the company. By the end of the 2009 fiscal year, Nintendo saw record net sales and profit of ¥1.8 trillion (US$18.7 billion) and ¥279 billion (US$2.8 billion), respectively. Due to his success, Barron's included Iwata on their list of the 30 top CEOs worldwide from 2007 to 2009, stating that for Nintendo, "Wii (was) a winner; stock soars" under him.

==== Quality-of-life products ====
Iwata presenting at E3 2009

Starting with the introduction of the Wii in 2006, Iwata placed focus on development of products that improved quality of life. The Wii Fit series, conceptualized by Miyamoto, epitomized this movement. At E3 2009, Iwata revealed development of an add-on product to the Wii: the Wii Vitality Sensor. The device measured autonomic nerve functions, namely pulse, and incorporate acquired data into relaxation products. Iwata saw the device as a continuation of the "blue ocean" strategy previously articulated. He indicated that the market of motion controls was turning into a "red ocean", whereby too many companies would saturate the market and restrict profits. The Vitality Sensor was developed in hopes of providing a novel way to interact with video games and continue Nintendo's history of innovation. However, testing of a prototype device yielded less than desirable results and Nintendo had postponed the release of the product indefinitely by 2013.

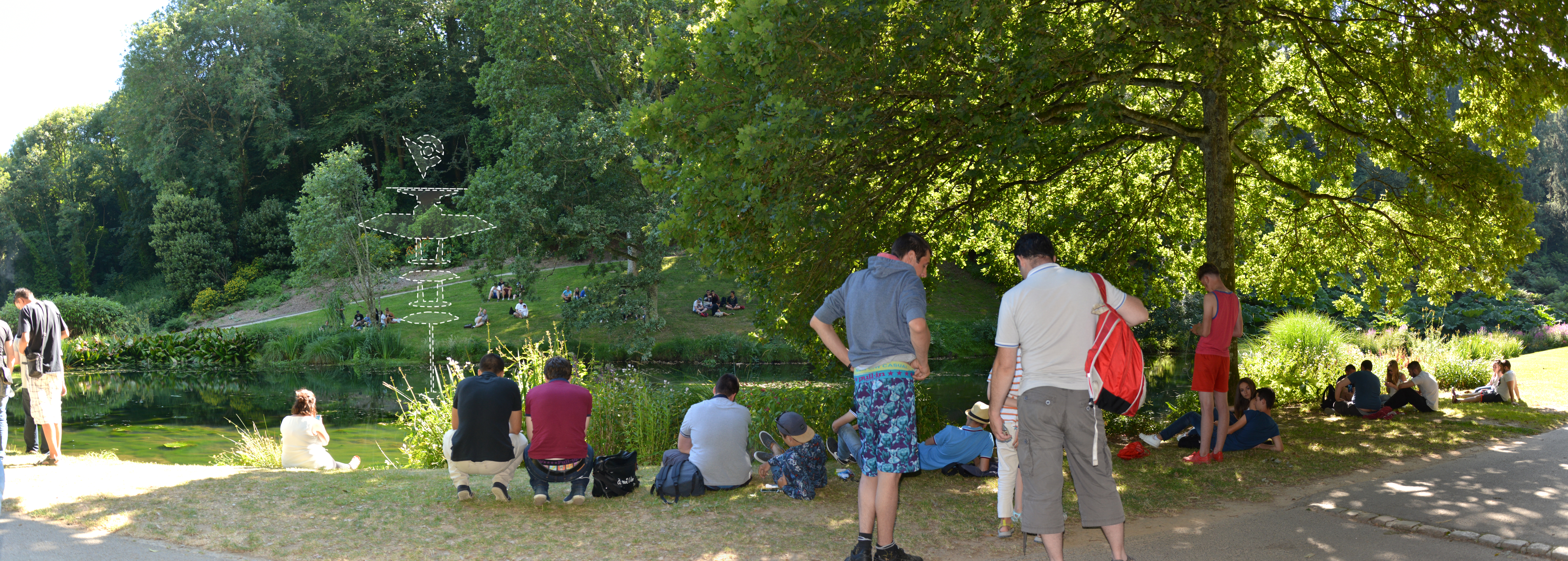
Players of Pokémon Go gathered around a "virtual" Pokémon gym. Social interactions outside homes like this was one of the goals of Iwata's quality-of-life initiative.

In January 2014, Iwata unveiled a ten-year strategy for the company based on quality-of-life products. The target was a new market outside video games. Developed under partnerships with Dr. Yasuyoshi Watanabe and ResMed, the first device in this initiative was a fatigue and sleep deprivation sensor announced in October 2014. Unlike the Vitality Sensor, the sleep sensor was to be a stand-alone product that would not need to be worn. Following Iwata's death in July 2015, analysts questioned whether Nintendo would continue the quality-of-life initiative. Despite a planned United States release in March 2016, some suggested the product had been temporarily shelved, while others believed the product had been indefinitely postponed like the Vitality Sensor before it. The device was formally discontinued by February 2016; however, Tatsumi Kimishima stated that research into quality of life products would continue. Nintendo-based products like the Nintendo Switch designed to encourage use on the go and social interactions, the mobile augmented reality game Pokémon Go that requires travelling outside the house, and its addition Pokémon Sleep that works based on a player's sleep patterns, all represent continuations of Iwata's quality-of-life initiative. The Switch game Ring Fit Adventure, which includes accessories that let players manipulate the game through physical exercise, is seen as a successor to Wii Fit and continuing the quality-of-life program.

=== Financial downturn (2010–2014) ===
Nintendo net sales by fiscal year (2006–2015) (Note: All totals are in JPY values of their respective years.)
Fiscal year	Sales (mil ¥)
2006	508,827
2007	966,534
2008	1,672,423
2009	1,838,622
2010	1,182,177
2011	1,014,345
2012	647,652
2013	635,422
2014	571,726
2015	549,780
Nintendo's annual net sales in millions of yen Note: Green indicates an operating income while black indicates an operating loss.

Subsequent hardware units under Iwata's tenure, including the Nintendo 3DS and Wii U, were not as successful as the DS and Wii, and Nintendo's finances took a downward turn starting in 2010. During the development phase of the 3DS, a handheld device featuring stereoscopic 3D without the need of accessories, Iwata stated that his background in technology helped keep Nintendo's engineers in line. It was hoped that the successor to the Nintendo DS would reinvigorate the company after profits began declining. However, weak sales upon the release of the Nintendo 3DS caused the company's stock to fall by 12 percent on July 29, 2011. The console's poor sales prompted a price cut in August from its launch price of US$250 to US$170. Sales of the 3DS continually fell below expectations. Iwata later admitted in 2014 that he had misread the market and had not appropriately accounted for changing lifestyles since the launch of the Wii. He continually placed focus on family-oriented games despite declining popularity.

The Wii U, released in November 2012, was sold below its production cost as Nintendo hoped for stronger software sales to alleviate ongoing losses. The addition of HD graphics, a feature not present in the original Wii, placed unexpected strain on development teams and led to software delays. Compounding the frustration of consumers was Iwata's disinterest in competitors such as Microsoft and Sony, both of which experienced similar issues during the releases of the Xbox 360 and PlayStation 3 respectively. Paul Tassi of Forbes claimed that Nintendo could have handled the change more efficiently by drawing lessons from Microsoft and Sony's transition to HD graphics. The console ultimately failed to meet sales expectations and became the slowest-selling Nintendo platform, with 9.5 million units sold by June 2015. Miyamoto attributed the lackluster sales to public misunderstandings of the console's concept and functionality. Iwata later admitted the console to be a failure as a successor to the Wii, with games being unable to showcase notable originality in the Wii U. The back-to-back failures of the 3DS and Wii U prompted Mitsushige Akino of Ichiyoshi Asset Management Co. to suggest that Iwata should resign from his position.

Iwata at the GDC 2011

Nintendo's overall net sales declined from its peak of ¥1.8 trillion (US$18.7 billion) in 2009 to ¥549 billion (US$4.6 billion) in 2015. Net income losses were incurred in 2012 and 2014. In 2010, Nintendo revealed that Iwata earned a modest salary of ¥68 million (US$770,000), which increased to ¥187 million (US$2.11 million) with performance based bonuses. In comparison, Miyamoto earned a salary of ¥100 million (US$1.13 million). Iwata voluntarily halved his salary in 2011 and 2014 as apologies for the poor sales while other members of the Nintendo board of directors had pay cuts of 20–30 percent. This also served to ensure the job security of Nintendo's employees, preventing workers from being laid off in order to improve short-term finances. In 2012, the company experienced its first operating loss since entering the video game market more than 30 years earlier. Losses continued for the next two years before the company finally returned to profitability at the end of the 2015 fiscal year. The slight turnaround was largely attributed to blockbuster games such as Pokémon Omega Ruby and Alpha Sapphire and Super Smash Bros. for Nintendo 3DS and Wii U.

In June 2013, Iwata took on the additional role of Nintendo of America's CEO. As one of his first changes as CEO, Iwata decided that they would not hold large press conferences at E3, and instead have several smaller events, each aimed at a certain demographic. While traveling to Tokyo in late 2013, Iwata sketched an idea for a series of physical toys that could connect with Nintendo's games. This concept soon developed into the Amiibo line of figures which launched less than a year later. Amiibo proved to be a huge success, with more than 6 million figurines sold by the end of 2014, roughly a month after launch. By March 2016, combined sales of figures and cards—a product released in 2015—exceeded 64 million units, proving financially beneficial across all Nintendo platforms.

=== Mobile market and Switch (2015) ===
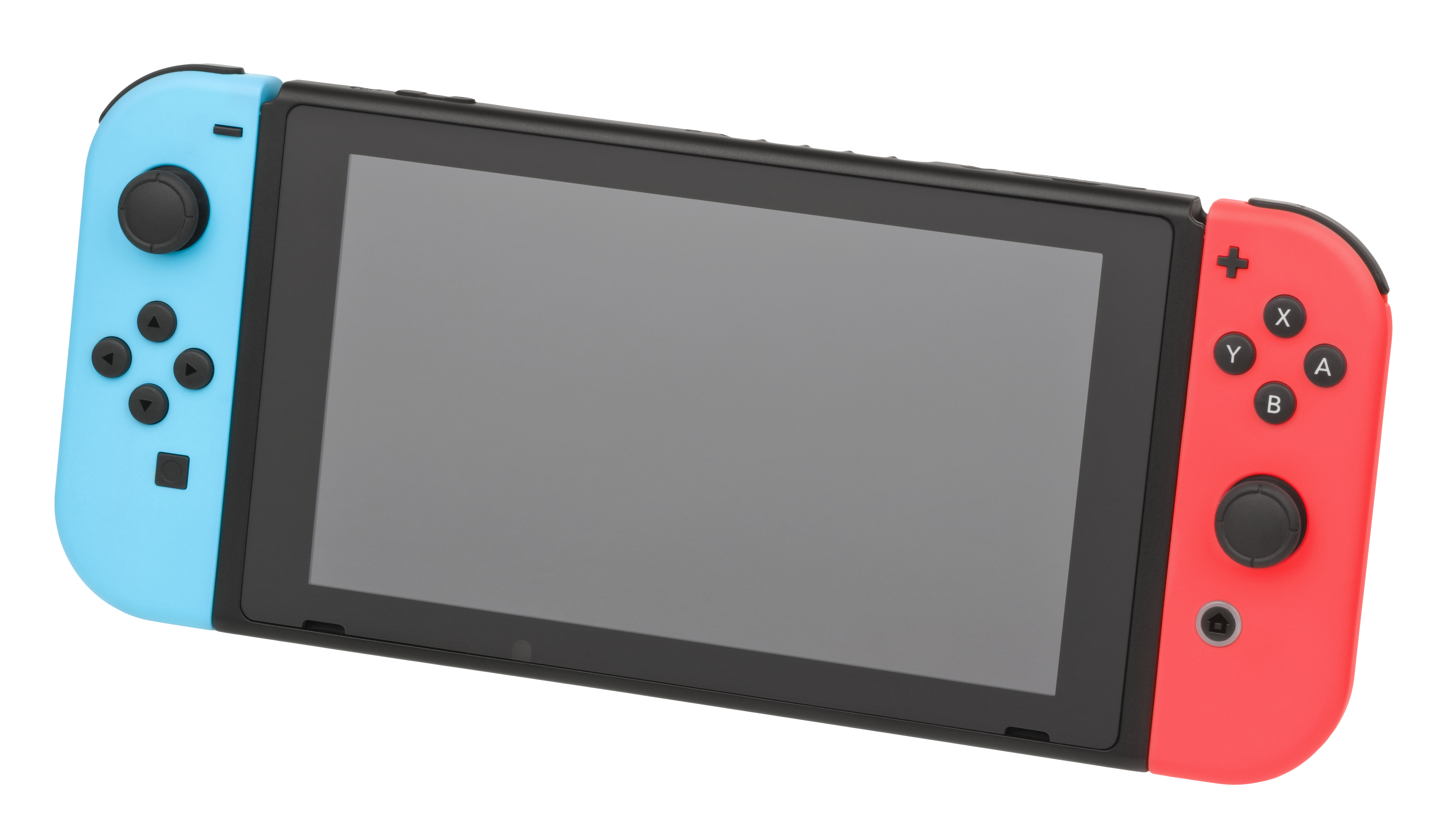
The Nintendo Switch in its handheld form with the Joy-Con controllers attached

In early 2010, the success of Apple Inc.'s mobile App Store prompted concern among game developers that the medium was shifting to smart devices. That July, Iwata acknowledged competition from Apple and considered them the "enemy of the future". However, during an interview the following year, Iwata appeared entirely against the idea of Nintendo moving into the mobile market, claiming the company would "cease to be Nintendo" if they did so. He reasoned that mobile gaming would lack integrity over the quality of games in an effort to turn a profit. A slow shift in this view ensued over the following years as the mobile gaming market continued to grow. In 2012 he acknowledged that mobile devices provided significant competition but remained confident in his company's abilities. In a message to shareholders in March 2014 fiscal year, Iwata stated, "... I believe that the era has ended when people play all kinds of games only on dedicated gaming systems." He cited the convenience of mobile devices for quick entertainment and expansive capabilities over a handheld console's dedicated software. Criticism arose over his continued stubbornness in moving to the mobile market, with analysts and investors continually requesting a change in outlook. Yoshihisa Toyosaki, president of Architect Grand Design Inc., claimed that "Nintendo is out of touch", referring to the company's history of ignoring outside input. This ultimately negatively influenced Nintendo's finances and popularity to a degree.

In March 2015, Iwata put part of Nintendo's focus on the growing mobile game market, creating a landmark partnership with mobile provider DeNA to publish games, as traditional hardware console sales began to falter. This came in contrast to Nintendo's previous business model which put focus on console exclusives to prompt people to buy their platforms. Iwata emphasized that although Nintendo IPs would be utilized in mobile games, the company would not compromise their integrity. He also stressed that the main goal would be to reach as many people as possible rather than which options would earn the most money, similar to the idea behind the Wii. After the partnership with DeNA was established, Iwata reiterated his stance that the common free-to-play type mobile games, which he referred to as "free-to-start", threatened the future quality of games. He also emphasized that the business model for these games did not match with the core values of Nintendo and could not serve as the basis of "long-lasting relationship with [Nintendo's] customers".

Iwata oversaw development of the Nintendo Switch through the final months of his life, serving as the console's head developer. In a February 2017 interview with the magazine Time, Miyamoto believed Iwata's goal for the system was to make it portable and allow communication between people. Iwata focused on the technical aspects of the device during this stage.

=== Public relations ===
Iwata was well known for incorporating his humor into his Nintendo Direct videos, such as during a pre-recorded video shown at E3 2012 when he stared at bananas in silence for several seconds before turning to the camera.

During the earlier years of his presidency at Nintendo, Iwata would often forgo media appearances, unless new hardware was being announced, in order to spend more time programming. However, his attitude towards this changed, and he eventually became a prominent part of Nintendo's public relations. Iwata helped Nintendo to improve relations with its fans by regularly responding to them through social media, and he shared insights on Nintendo's employees, games, and hardware through his interview series Iwata Asks. Inspiration for this series, which began in September 2006, stemmed from Iwata's background as a game programmer and his curiosity of the mindset of other developers. These interviews often showcased the friendly camaraderie between Iwata and other members of Nintendo as jokes and laughter were commonplace. They also revealed a different side of the normally secretive Nintendo: openness to discuss some of the inner workings of the company.

In 2011, Iwata helped to institute Nintendo Direct, a series of online press conferences open to all that revealed upcoming Nintendo games and products outside of typical industry channels. These videos were often quirky and humorous, reflecting the personality of Iwata himself. This stood completely against the generally serious tones displayed by Sony and Microsoft. One such video displayed a mock battle between him and Nintendo of America President Reggie Fils-Aimé to showcase the inclusion of Mii characters, Nintendo digital avatars, in Super Smash Bros. for Nintendo 3DS and Wii U. These frequently spurred the creation of Internet memes; such memes include the phrase "please understand" which was often used by Iwata for delays or other negative news, adding "[Iwata laughs]" to forum posts as a reference to his frequent laughter in segments of Iwata Asks, and images of Iwata staring silently at a bunch of bananas as part of a pre-recorded E3 2012 video to promote the Donkey Kong franchise.

As a byproduct of his presence in Iwata Asks and Nintendo Direct, Iwata became the public face of Nintendo. Iwata enjoyed conversing with reporters and would prepare stories in advance to entertain them. Even when time did not allow, he would mingle with interviewers and chat casually.

=== Other projects ===
Iwata assisted in the founding of Creatures Inc. and The Pokémon Company which were established in 1995 and 1998, respectively, by Tsunekazu Ishihara. Iwata later coordinated licensing changes domestically and internationally with The Pokémon Company when it became its own entity. In 1998, Iwata helped his colleague and personal friend Shigesato Itoi establish Hobonichi by working as the company's IT Manager. He acquired this position after being asked by Itoi one month prior to the June 6 launch date to arrange a website and the company's technical systems, to which Iwata complied. Iwata personally enjoyed the role and even still held the position in 2007, despite running Nintendo full-time by this point. Soon after his promotion to president of Nintendo, Iwata assigned himself to a development team at HAL Laboratory working on Super Smash Bros. Melee, for the GameCube, to continue his programming passion. Stemming from his work with the Brain Age series, Iwata assisted in producing educational games such as Kanji Sonomama Rakubiki Jiten DS, English Training: Have Fun Improving Your Skills!, and Imasara Hito ni Kikenai Otona no Joushikiryoku Training DS. He also worked on Animal Crossing, Mario, Metroid Prime, and The Legend of Zelda series of games, among others. He also had a cameo in WarioWare: Smooth Moves. Iwata partook in the development of Pokémon Go, an augmented reality mobile game, starting in 2013. The game was publicly revealed in September 2015, two months after his death.

== Illness and death ==
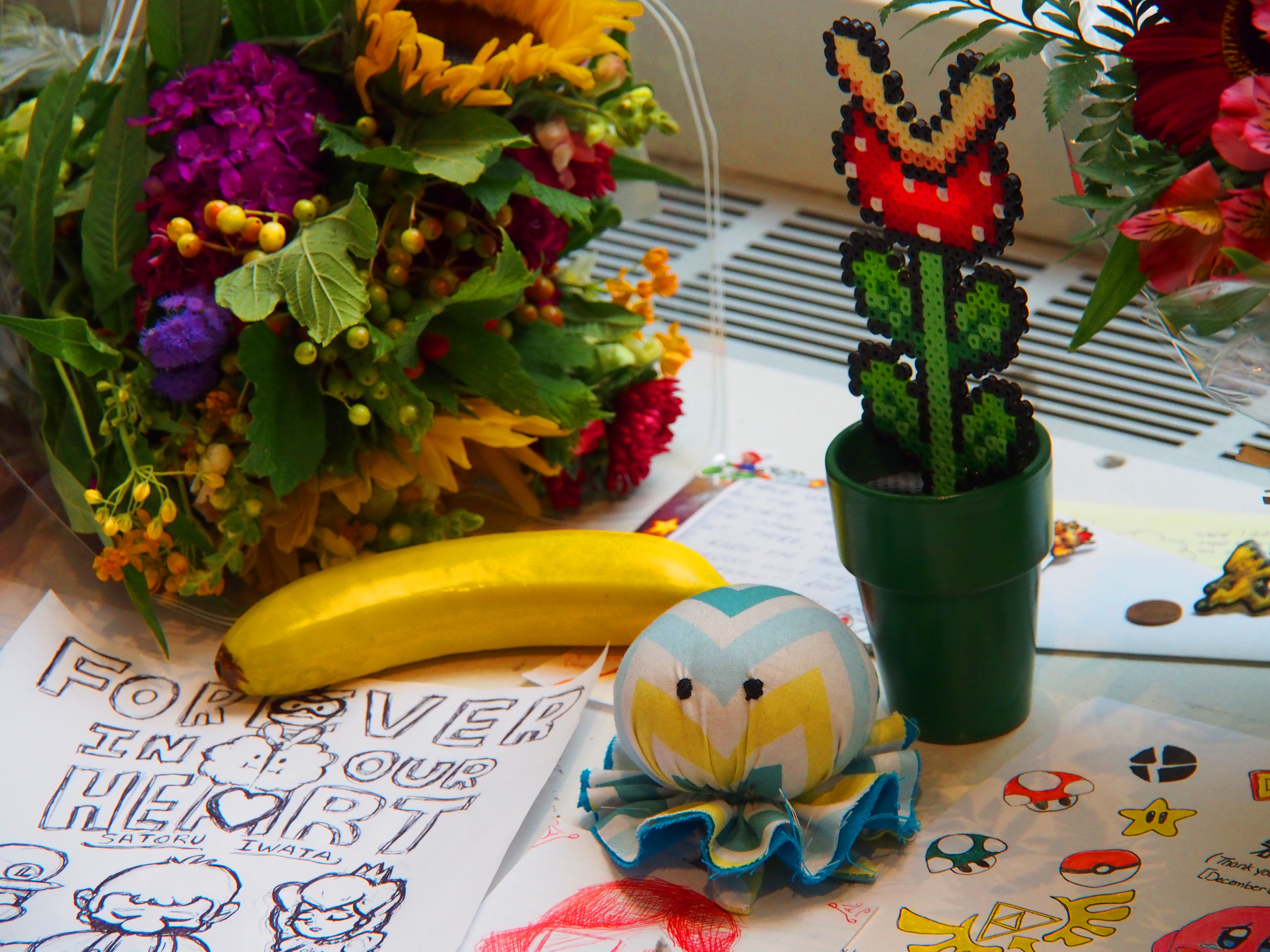
Fans left memorabilia and personalized artwork of various Nintendo video game series, including Mario, Kirby, and The Legend of Zelda, dedicated to Iwata at a memorial in the Nintendo World Store.

On June 5, 2014, Nintendo announced that Iwata would not attend E3 2014 due to medical problems. Iwata issued a public message to shareholders on June 24 that he had undergone surgery the previous week to remove a tumor in his bile duct discovered during a routine physical examination. After roughly four months of recovery from a successful surgery, he returned to work in October. During this time he lost a notable amount of weight, but stated he was feeling healthier as a result. Iwata made his first public appearance on a Nintendo Direct announcement on November 5, but looked "gaunt and pale". He appeared to take this in stride and updated his own Mii, avatars used in Nintendo hardware, in June 2015 to reflect his slimmer self. On January 28, 2015, Iwata came down with a high fever and was suspected to have influenza; a meeting with shareholders was postponed accordingly. Some time after attending a different shareholder meeting on June 26, Iwata became ill again and was hospitalized. Despite his hospitalization, Iwata continued to work via his laptop in his bed and provided feedback on Pokémon Go to Tsunekazu Ishihara. He died due to complications from the tumor on July 11 at the age of 55 at Kyoto University Hospital. He was survived by his wife Kayoko (佳代子). Nintendo announced his death the following day.

Flags at Nintendo's headquarters were lowered to half-staff on July 13. Nintendo's regional offices took a day of silence on July 13 across all of its social media accounts in remembrance of Iwata. Members of the gaming industry and fans alike expressed their sadness on social media over Iwata's death and gratitude for his accomplishments. Fans established memorials across the world, including at the Japanese Embassy in Moscow, Russia, and the Nintendo World Store in Manhattan, New York. Shuhei Yoshida, president of SCE Worldwide Studios, stated: "I pray that Mr. Iwata, who contributed so much to the development of the gaming industry, rests in peace." Composer and director Junichi Masuda, most known for his work with the Pokémon games, tweeted: "He was a man who understood Pokémon, and a great leader. When I visited the other day, he was well. I will pray for his soul from the bottom of my heart." The Tokyo Institute of Technology issued a memorial statement on August 4, with Iwata's former classmates and professors contributing their memories. At the Game Awards 2015, Reggie Fils-Aimé delivered a tribute to Iwata, describing him as "fearless" and "unique, in the fullest meaning of the word".

Several hours after the announcement of Iwata's death, a photograph of a rainbow over Nintendo's headquarters in Kyoto was posted to Twitter and widely shared; it was dubbed "the Rainbow Road to heaven", in reference to a stage in the Mario Kart series. Buddhist funeral services for Iwata were held in Kyoto on July 16 and 17. Despite stormy weather produced by Typhoon Nangka, an estimated 4,100 people attended to pay their respects. Among the attendees were Reggie Fils-Aimé, Shigeru Miyamoto, Genyo Takeda, and Iwata's close friend Masahiro Sakurai. Following the wake, Iwata's remains were cremated and his ashes were buried at an undisclosed place in Kyoto.

Following Iwata's death, general directors Shigeru Miyamoto and Genyo Takeda temporarily managed the company together. On September 14, Nintendo announced that Tatsumi Kimishima, head of its Human Resources Division and former CEO of Nintendo of America, would succeed Iwata as the fifth president of Nintendo.

== Influence and legacy ==
On my business card, I am a corporate president. In my mind, I am a game developer. But in my heart, I am a gamer.

— Satoru Iwata, keynote speech at GDC 2005

Throughout his life, Iwata was known for unconventional ideas and changing the medium of gaming. He was seen as the embodiment of Nintendo: playful, quirky, humorous, and fun. Iwata's proficiency in programming led many to refer to him as a "genius" in the subject, with some likening him to a Japanese Bill Gates. His hands-on approach to business earned him admiration and respect from both developers and gamers. The opening to Iwata's "Heart of a Gamer" speech at GDC 2005 is regarded as the "essence" of who he was: a humble businessman dedicated to video games. He, alongside others at Nintendo such as Miyamoto, are credited with vastly expanding the gaming market and creating a new genre. By targeting a new audience instead of competing against Microsoft and Sony, Iwata avoided a "straight fight" with Nintendo's competitors and successfully achieved his goals. Accordingly, Iwata was referred to as a "gentle revolutionary". The simplistic appeal of the Nintendo DS and Wii served to expand the market. Chris Kohler of Wired magazine stated that "thanks to Nintendo's Satoru Iwata, we're all gamers now," referring to the surge in video game popularity following the releases of the Nintendo DS and Wii. Although widely respected, he received criticism over his stubbornness in moving Nintendo to the mobile market. Following Iwata's death, Reggie Fils-Aimé remarked, "... it will be years before his impact on both Nintendo and the full video game industry will be fully appreciated."

In October 2015, a fan-made Amiibo featuring Iwata's Mii avatar was crafted and auctioned for US$1,900 on eBay; all proceeds were to be donated to the Child's Play charity in his memory. Iwata was posthumously and unanimously granted the Lifetime Achievement Award at the 2015 Golden Joystick Awards for his influence across the gaming industry. Iwata was also posthumously granted the Lifetime Achievement Award at the 2016 DICE Awards. At the 2016 Game Developers Choice Awards, Iwata was honored with a short animated film by David Hellman, the artist who worked on Braid. In July 2019, Hobonichi published a book, 岩田さん (Iwata-san), by Yasuda Nagata in Japan. The book includes excerpts from many Iwata Asks interviews and interviews with Iwata's closest friends, including Shigeru Miyamoto and Shigesato Itoi, after his death. In response to public demand, the agency is planning to localize the book in multiple languages with the Tuttle-Mori Agency. Viz Media published the title as Ask Iwata in North America on April 13, 2021.

=== Video game tributes ===
A tribute in honor of Iwata, reading "This game is dedicated to our wingman who fell in battle", was placed at the end of the credits for Star Fox Zero. Another speculated tribute appears in the Nintendo Switch 2017 launch game The Legend of Zelda: Breath of the Wild, a game in development at the time of his death. A non-playable character, who bears a striking resemblance to Satoru Iwata, asks for the player to go atop Satori Mountain in search of the mystical Lord of the Mountain, who is also known by the name "Satori". Given the similarity between "Satori" and "Satoru" and the fact that the Lord of the Mountain is seen as a guiding spirit, the quest is thought to be an elaborate tribute to Iwata. Both the non-playable character and the Lord of the Mountain return in The Legend of Zelda: Tears of the Kingdom.

In September 2017, modders discovered that an emulated version of the NES game Golf, which Iwata programmed, is included in the Nintendo Switch firmware, accessed by moving the Joy-Con controllers similarly to how Iwata would move his hands in Nintendo Direct presentations when the system clock is set to July 11, the day of his death. This appeared to have been removed by Nintendo with a system update issued later that year. Within Pokémon Ultra Sun and Ultra Moon, visiting the Game Freak building with Pokémon introduced in Pokémon Gold and Silver has a non-player character relate how they were having trouble getting data onto the Game Boy Color game cards until they were helped by an "amazing guy"; this acknowledges Iwata's contribution to Gold and Silver that allowed them to include the whole of the world from Pokémon Red and Blue without compromising the size of the Gold/Silver world.

== Bibliography ==
- Iwata, Satoru (2021). Ask Iwata: Words of Wisdom from Satoru Iwata, Nintendo's Legendary CEO. San Francisco: Viz. ISBN 978-19-7472-154-2.

== See also ==
- History of Nintendo

== Sources ==
- Bagnall, Brian (2011). Commodore: A Company on the Edge (2nd ed.). Winnipeg, Canada: Variant Press. ISBN 978-0-9738649-6-0.
- Hasegawa, Yozo (2010). Rediscovering Japanese Business Leadership: 15 Japanese Managers and the Companies They're Leading to New Growth. Translated by Anthony Kimm. Singapore: Wiley. ISBN 978-0-470-82495-5.
- Inoue, Osamu (2009). Nintendo Magic: Winning the Video Game Wars. Translated by Paul Tuttle Starr. Tokyo, Japan: Vertical. ISBN 978-1-934287-22-4.
- Jones, Steven E.; Thiruvathukal, George K. (February 24, 2012). Codename Revolution: The Nintendo Wii Platform. Platform Studies. Cambridge, Massachusetts: Massachusetts Institute of Technology. ISBN 978-0-262-01680-3.
- Kasai, Omasu (January 1994). Gēmudezainā nyūmon ゲームデザイナー入門 [Introduction to Game Design] (in Japanese). Tokyo, Japan: Shogakukan. ISBN 978-4-09-220205-4.
