= Index of Windows games (E) =

This is an index of Microsoft Windows games.

This list has been split into multiple pages. Please use the Table of Contents to browse it.

Title	Released	Developer	Publisher
E-racer	2001	Rage Software	Rage Software
E.Y.E.: Divine Cybermancy	2011	Streum On Studio	Streum On Studio
EA Sports GameShow	2007	EA Tiburon	EA Sports
Earache: Extreme Metal Racing	2006	Data Design Interactive	Data Design Interactive
Earth & Beyond	2002	Westwood Studios	Electronic Arts
Earth 2140	1997	Reality Pump Studios	TopWare Interactive, Interplay Productions
Earth 2150	2000	Reality Pump Studios	TopWare Interactive, Mattel Interactive
Earth 2150: Lost Souls	2001	TopWare Interactive	Blackstar Interactive, Strategy First
Earth 2150: The Moon Project	2000	TopWare Interactive	Strategic Simulations, Inc.
Earth 2160	2005	Reality Pump	Deep Silver
Earthlock	2016	Snowcastle Games	Snowcastle Games
Earthrise	2009	Masthead Studios	Iceberg Interactive
Earthsiege 2	1996	Dynamix	Sierra On-Line
Earthworm Jim	1995	Shiny Entertainment	Activision
Earthworm Jim 3D	2000	VIS Entertainment	Interplay Entertainment
East India Company	2009	Nitro Games	Paradox Interactive
Eastshade	2019	Eastshade Studios	Eastshade Studios
Ecco the Dolphin	2010	Novotrade International	Sega
Echelon	2001	MADia Entertainment	BUKA
Echo	2017	Ultra Ultra	Ultra Ultra
Echo: Secrets of the Lost Cavern	2005	Kheops Studio	The Adventure Company
Ecstatica II	1997	Andrew Spencer Studios	Psygnosis
Ed, Edd n Eddy: The Mis-Edventures	2005	Artificial Mind and Movement	Midway Games
eden*	2009	Minori	Minori, MangaGamer
Edge	2011	Two Tribes	Mobigame
Edge of Twilight	2009	Fuzzyeyes	SouthPeak Games
Edna & Harvey: Harvey's New Eyes	2012	Daedalic Entertainment	Daedalic Entertainment
Edna & Harvey: The Breakout	2008	Daedalic Entertainment	Daedalic Entertainment
Eets	2006	Klei Entertainment	Klei Entertainment
Ef: The First Tale	2006	Minori	Minori, MangaGamer
Ef: The Latter Tale	2008	Minori	Minori, MangaGamer
Eggerland Episode 0: Quest of Rara	1996	Avit	HAL Corporation
Egoboo	1999	Egoboo Development Team	Ben Bishop
Egypt Kids	2001	EMG	Cryo Interactive
Eidolon	2014	Ice Water Games	Ice Water Games
El Paso, Elsewhere	2023	Strange Scaffold	Strange Scaffold
Elasto Mania	2000	Balazs Rozsa	Independent
Elden Ring	2022	FromSoftware	Bandai Namco Entertainment
The Elder Scrolls III: Bloodmoon	2003	Bethesda Softworks	Bethesda Softworks
The Elder Scrolls III: Morrowind	2002	Bethesda Game Studios	Bethesda Softworks, Ubisoft
The Elder Scrolls III: Tribunal	2002	Bethesda Softworks	Bethesda Softworks
The Elder Scrolls IV: Oblivion	2006	Bethesda Softworks	2K Games
The Elder Scrolls IV: Shivering Isles	2007	Bethesda Game Studios	Bethesda Softworks, 2K Games
The Elder Scrolls V: Skyrim	2011	Bethesda Game Studios	Bethesda Softworks
Elemental: War of Magic	2010	Stardock	Stardock
Elements of Destruction	2007	Frozen Codebase	THQ
ELEX	2017	Piranha Bytes	THQ Nordic
ELEX 2	2022	Piranha Bytes	THQ Nordic
Elf Bowling	1999	NStorm, Inc.	NStorm, Inc.
Elite Warriors: Vietnam	2005	nFusion	Infogrames
Elven Legacy	2009	1C Company	Paradox Interactive
Ember	2016	N-Fusion Interactive	505 Games
Embodiment of Scarlet Devil	2002	Team Shanghai Alice	Team Shanghai Alice
Emerald City Confidential	2009	Wadjet Eye Games	PlayFirst
Emergency	1998	Sixteen Tons Entertainment	Arush Entertainment
Emergency Fire Response	2003	Monte Cristo Multimedia	DreamCatcher Interactive
Emily Wants to Play	2015	Shawn Hitchcock	Hitchcock Games
Emperor: Battle for Dune	2001	Intelligent Games, Westwood Studios	EA Games
Emperor: Rise of the Middle Kingdom	2002	BreakAway Games, Impressions Games	Sierra Entertainment
Empire Earth	2001	Stainless Steel Studios	Sierra Entertainment
Empire Earth: The Art of Conquest	2002	Mad Doc Software	Sierra Entertainment
Empire Earth II	2005	Mad Doc Software	Vivendi Universal
Empire Earth II: The Art of Supremacy	2006	Mad Doc Software	Vivendi Universal
Empire Earth III	2007	Mad Doc Software	Sierra Entertainment
Empire in Arms: The Napoleonic Wars of 1805–1815	2004	Outflank Strategy Wargames	Matrix Games
Empire of the Ants	2000	Microids	Microids
Empire of the Ants	2024	Tower Five	Microids
Empire: Total War	2009	The Creative Assembly	Sega
Empires: Dawn of the Modern World	2003	Stainless Steel Studios	Activision
Empyrion - Galactic Survival	2020	Eleon Game Studios	Eleon Game Studios
Enclave	2002	Starbreeze Studios	Vivendi Universal Games
Endless Ages	2003	Avaria Corporation	SummitSoft Entertainment
Endless Legend	2014	Amplitude Studios	Iceberg Interactive, Sega
Endless Space	2012	Amplitude Studios	Iceberg Interactive, Sega
Endless Space 2	2017	Amplitude Studios	Sega
Endorfun	1995	Onesong Partners	Time Warner Interactive
Endzone: A World Apart	2021	Gentlymad Studios	Assemble Entertainment
Enemy Engaged 2	2007	G2 CES	G2 Games
Enemy Engaged: RAH-66 Comanche vs. KA-52 Hokum	2000	Razorworks	Empire Interactive
Enemy Front	2014	CI Games	CI Games
Enemy Nations	1997	Windward Studios	Head Games Publishing
Enemy Territory: Quake Wars	2007	Splash Damage, id Software	Activision
Enemy Zero	1996	WARP	Sega
Enigma: Rising Tide	2003	Tesseraction Games	Dreamcatcher Interactive
Enigmo	2003	Pangea Software	Pangea Software
Enslaved: Odyssey to the West	2013	Ninja Theory	Namco Bandai Games
Enter the Matrix	2003	Shiny Entertainment	Atari, Warner Bros. Interactive Entertainment
Entomorph: Plague of the Darkfall	1995	Cyberlore Studios	Mindscape
Entropia Universe	2003	MindArk, FPC	MindArk, FPC
The Entropy Centre	2022	Stubby Games	Playstack
Eragon	2006	Stormfront Studios	Vivendi Universal Games
Escape Dead Island	2014	Fatshark	Deep Silver
Escape from Monkey Island	2000	LucasArts	LucasArts
Escape From Paradise City	2007	Sirius Games	CDV Software
Escape Velocity Nova	2002	Ambrosia Software, ATMOS	Ambrosia Software
Eschalon: Book I	2007	Basilisk Games	Basilisk Games
Eschalon: Book II	2009	Basilisk Games	Basilisk Games
The Eternal Cylinder	2021	ACE Team	Good Shepherd Entertainment
Eternal Fantasy	2007	Circus	Circus
Eternity's Child	2008	Luc Bernard, Silver Sphere Studios	Silver Sphere Studios
Ether One	2014	White Paper Games	White Paper Games
Eufloria	2009	Omni Systems Limited	Headup Games
Euro Truck Simulator	2008	SCS Software	SCS Software, Excalibur Publishing, Meridian4
Eurofighter	2001	Digital Image Design, Rage Software	Rage Software
Europa 1400: The Guild	2002	4HEAD Studios	JoWood Productions
Europa Universalis	2000	Paradox Interactive	Strategy First, Typhoon Games
Europa Universalis II	2001	Paradox Interactive	Strategy First
Europa Universalis III	2007	Paradox Interactive	Paradox Interactive
Europa Universalis IV	2013	Paradox Development Studio	Paradox Interactive
Europa Universalis: Crown of the North	2000	Paradox Entertainment	Levande Böcker, PAN Vision, Strategy First
Europa Universalis: Rome	2008	Paradox Interactive	Paradox Interactive
European Air War	1998	MicroProse	MicroProse
EVE Burst Error	1997	C's Ware	C's Ware
Eve Online	2003	CCP Games	SSI, CCP Games
Event 0	2016	Ocelot Society	Ocelot Society
Ever 17: The Out of Infinity	2002	KID	KID, Hirameki International
EverQuest	1999	Sony Online Entertainment	Sony Online Entertainment
EverQuest II	2004	Sony Online Entertainment	Sony Online Entertainment, Gamania, Akella, Square Enix, Ubisoft
Eversion	2010	Zaratustra Productions	Zaratustra Productions
Everspace	2017	Rockfish Games	Rockfish Games
Everspace 2	2023	Rockfish Games	Rockfish Games
Everybody's Gone to the Rapture	2016	The Chinese Room	Sony Computer Entertainment
Everyday Shooter	2007	Queasy Games	Valve
Everything	2017	David OReilly	Double Fine Productions
Evidence: The Last Report	1996	Microïds	Microïds
Evidence: The Last Ritual	2006	Lexis Numerique	Ubisoft, The Adventure Company
Evil Dead: Hail to the King	2000	Heavy Iron Studios	THQ
Evil Dead: Regeneration	2005	Cranky Pants Games	THQ
Evil Dead: The Game	2022	Saber Interactive	Boss Team Games
Evil Genius	2004	Elixir Studios	Sierra Entertainment
Evil Islands: Curse of the Lost Soul	2000	Nival Interactive	Nival Interactive
Evil Twin: Cyprien's Chronicles	2001	In Utero	Ubisoft
Evil West	2022	Flying Wild Hog	Focus Entertainment
The Evil Within	2014	Tango Gameworks	Bethesda Softworks
The Evil Within 2	2017	Tango Gameworks	Bethesda Softworks
Evochron Alliance	2007	StarWraith 3D Games	StarWraith 3D Games
Evochron Legends	2009	StarWraith 3D Games	StarWraith 3D Games
Evochron Renegades	2007	StarWraith 3D Games	StarWraith 3D Games
Evoland	2013	Shiro Games	Shiro Games
Evoland 2	2015	Shiro Games	Shiro Games
Evolution: The Game of Intelligent Life	1997	Crossover Technologies	Interplay Entertainment, Discovery Channel Multimedia
Evolva	2000	Computer Artworks Ltd.	Interplay Entertainment
Evolve	2015	Turtle Rock Studios	2K
Ex Zeus	2005	Hyper-Devbox Japan	Hyper-Devbox Japan, Conspiracy Entertainment, 505 Games, Metro3D
Excalibur 2555 AD	1997	Tempest Software	Sir-tech
The Exit 8	2023	Kotake Create	Kotake Create
Exo One	2021	Exbleative	Future Friends Games
Expeditions: A MudRunner Game	2024	Saber Interactive	Focus Entertainment
Expeditions: Conquistador	2013	Logic Artists	BitComposer
Expeditions: Rome	2022	Logic Artists	THQ Nordic
Expeditions: Viking	2017	Logic Artists	Logic Artists
EXperience112	2007	Lexis Numerique	Micro Application
Explodemon	2009	Curve Studios	Curve Studios
Exteel	2007	NCsoft	NCsoft
Extinction	2018	Iron Galaxy	Modus Games
Extreme Paintbrawl	1998	Creative Carnage	Head Games Publishing
Extreme Rock Climbing	1999	Creative Carnage	Head Games Publishing
Extreme-G 2	1998	Probe Entertainment	Acclaim Entertainment
