= Alten8 =

Former British video game developer and publisher

Alten8 Ltd.
- Type: Limited
- Industry: Interactive entertainment
- Founded: 2005
- Defunct: 2010
- Fate: Dissolved
- Headquarters: Luton, England
- Key people: Paul Andrews; (CEO); Matt Bateman; (Head of Creative Development); Chris Bailey; (Head of Technical Operations)
- Products: Eternity's Child; GT Racers (GBA); Etrom; Power of Destruction; Concrete Surfer (DVD); Johnny Morris: The Magic Memoirs (DVD)
- Website: www.alten8.com

Alten8 Ltd. was a British video game developer and publisher. It produced both licensed retro games and current format video games, including the emulation code for C64 titles on Nintendo's Virtual Console service.

Alten8 ceased trading in December 2010.

== History ==
The company was formed by Paul Andrews after his involvement with the website Retro-Trader, which led him to be commissioned to gather retro game licenses for a plug-into-TV video game console using games such as Ant Attack (originally on the ZX Spectrum). When this was never realised he formed Alten8 to make use of the gathered licenses and expanded its remit, gaining Game Boy Advance, Nintendo DS, Wii and Xbox 360 developer status. An initial GBA release, GT Racers, through another publisher convinced Alten8 to self-publish all titles where possible from that point onwards, or to develop console titles under contract only from major publishers, billing itself as the "Alten8 way of publishing games".

== Games ==
Alten8 published over 500 licensed retro games across formats such as the ZX Spectrum, Commodore 64 and Amiga. Many mobile phone games were both developed and owned by Alten8, with other licensed PC and Nintendo DS games published across the globe, including the DS remake of the popular homebrew Dreamcast game, Cool Herders. As well as developing the code for several retro titles on the VC, Alten8 also worked with new pioneering mobile phone companies such as Greystripe and Vollee.

== Controversies ==
In March 2006, Alten8 declared it would be publishing the mobile phone game Office Massacre. This led to a torrent of community and media backlash, with many people offended by the potentially gory and violent content. Bethesda Softworks founder Christopher Weaver even went to the lengths of name-calling Alten8 "... [a] bunch of idiots who don't understand the first thing about social responsibility". The game was quickly cancelled, with Alten8 stating "No offence ... was intended by this game, and we resent the comments made [and] the unfair and unjust comparison of this game to other extreme games." Office Massacre re-appeared, some months later as a reskinned, censor-friendly Office Zombies.

In 2008, Alten8 came under fire inadvertently, after an independent contract designer Luc Bernard who had done a single phone game for Alten8 did an independent interview. Bernard's anti-holocaust-themed DS game 'concept' was discussed, and then subsequently misdescribed by the press in an interview with the NY Times, Imagination Is The Only Escape, which was then immediately met with a media 'controversy' storm, with everyone from Destructoid who stated the concept was "the evolution of gaming, and the chance for videogames to tackle sensitive issues" to The New York Times itself having a distorted view on the interview they themselves carried out. But despite the initial press fuelled public confusion over the concept, an official quote from the Anti-Defamation League spokeswoman Myrna Shinbaum in which she appeared to actually endorse the game concept being made stating "We certainly believe that we have to find new ways of teaching lessons of the Holocaust as new technologies are being developed“ According to several erroneous internet sources, Nintendo themselves claimed that the game would never be released, however, this was confirmed to not be the case, and the game never went past the developers concept art. Imagination and its well-meant intentions by the developer was strongly backed by Alten8, but Alten8 itself had never known of its concept prior to the media storm, nor had any contract with the developer to produce it. Bernard went on to try to crowd fund and develop the game himself in 2013, but was unsuccessful.

== DVD Content ==
As well as video games, Alten8 also licensed material for release on DVD, as well as publishing its own content. In particular, the Johnny Morris DVD, "The Magic Memoirs" is a poignant release, as it was the last recorded Animal Magic episode, and was co-hosted by Terry Nutkins.

== Expansion ==
In 2008, Alten8 restructured its corporate layout to accommodate the many new staff and many new directions the company was heading in. Whilst the name of the company was the same, Alten8 itself was more of an umbrella term for the many studios underneath its banner, as well as the publishing brand for upcoming releases. Games development created with new IP were to be created by the Skull Monkey Games division, whilst Retro-Soft took care of the licensing and recreation of classic game brands owned by the company, such as the virtual console conversions and retro content for the iPhone. Film and CGI group mangledpixel provided the group with FMV for all internal projects, as well as the creation of external projects like shorts and 4D films; with its first outing, A Dream of Christmas 4D debuting at Babbacombe Model Village.

== Released Products ==
=== 2005 ===
- Etrom (PC)

=== 2006 ===
- GT Racers (GBA)
- Space Tanks (PC)

=== 2007 ===
- Power of Destruction (PC)
- Circus Linux (PC)

=== 2008 ===
- Civil Disturbance (PC)
- Hotwired and Gone (PC)
- Boulderdash (Virtual Console)
- California Games (Virtual Console)
- Cybernoid: The Fighting Machine (Virtual Console)
- Impossible Mission (Virtual Console)
- Impossible Mission 2 (Virtual Console)
- International Karate (Virtual Console)
- International Karate + (Virtual Console)
- Jumpman (Virtual Console)
- Last Ninja 2 (Virtual Console)
- Last Ninja 3 (Virtual Console)
- Mayhem in Monsterland (Virtual Console)
- Nebulus (Virtual Console)
- Paradroid (Virtual Console)
- Pitstop II (Virtual Console)
- Summer Games II (Virtual Console)
- The Last Ninja (Virtual Console)
- Uridium (Virtual Console)
- World Games (Virtual Console)
- Johnny Morris: The Magic Memoirs (DVD)
- Killing Time 24/7 (DVD)
- Teenage Witchcraft: A Beginners Guide (DVD)
- A Dream of Christmas 4D (4D film)
