= Mole Mania =

1996 video game

- North American box art
- Developers: Nintendo EAD; Pax Softnica
- Publisher: Nintendo
- Director: Masayuki Kameyama
- Producer: Shigeru Miyamoto
- Programmers: Motoo Yasuma; Yoshiaki Hoshino
- Artists: Eiko Takahashi; Naoki Watanabe; Noriko Aoki
- Composer: Taro Bando
- Platform: Game Boy
- Release: JP: July 21, 1996; NA: February 1997; EU: May 1997
- Genres: Action, puzzle
- Modes: Single-player, multiplayer

Mole Mania (Note: Known in Japan as Mogranya (Japanese: モグラ〜ニャ, Hepburn: Mogurānya)) is a 1996 video game developed and published by Nintendo for the Game Boy. It was released in Japan in July 1996, North America in February 1997 and Europe in May 1997. The game was re-released for the Nintendo 3DS Virtual Console in all major regions throughout 2012, and on Nintendo Classics in 2026.

== Gameplay ==
Gameplay screenshot

In the game, Muddy has to move a black ball to a gate at the end of the screen in order to get to the next screen. He can push, pull, and throw the black ball. Muddy can also dig into soft ground to find underground paths around obstacles. Choosing where to dig is a crucial element of the game's various puzzles, as creating holes in the wrong areas could hinder the player's efforts to advance. Dropping the ball into a hole would cause it to return to its starting point. Given the nature of Muddy's ability to move the ball, digging holes in the wrong places could make reaching the gate with the ball completely impossible, requiring Muddy to leave the screen and then return to try again. Along the way, there are many obstacles, such as moving enemies, pipes, barrels, weights, and bosses.

== Characters ==
Players play as a mole named Muddy Mole (known in Japan as Mogurānya (モグラ〜ニャ), whose wife and children have been kidnapped by the farmer, Jinbe. Muddy must find and rescue his wife and seven children by navigating his way through the seven worlds of Jinbe Land; avoiding enemies, solving puzzles, stealing cabbages, and defeating the boss of each world. Freeing his loved ones one by one before coming face-to-face with Jinbe himself.

Jinbe, a cabbage farmer and ruler of Jinbe Land, serves as the main antagonist to Muddy. He is depicted with a Mario-esque appearance and stature, wearing red overalls and a green shirt. His face is obscured by a full beard and he is seen wearing a brimmed gardener's hat.

Jinbe Land is home to a wide variety of enemies sent by Jinbe to intercept Muddy before rescuing his family. These enemies include dinosaurs as well as two unnamed "plumber sons" that Muddy must defeat later in the game.

== Release and reception ==
Reception

Review scores
Publication	Score
Famitsu	6/10, 7/10, 6/10, 5/10
IGN	8.0/10
Mega Fun	85%
Nintendo Power	3.4/5
Official Nintendo Magazine	85%
Total!	1

Mole Mania was released for the Game Boy on July 21, 1996 in Japan. Readers of Family Computer Magazine voted to give the game a 22.1 out of 30 score in a 1998 public poll. According to Famitsu, the title sold over 11,830 copies respectively in its first week on the market. It sold 89,407 copies during its lifetime in Japan. Four writers of Nintendo Power drew comparison with HAL Laboratory's Eggerland series, citing the game's mix of action and puzzle elements. They commended its catchy music, challenge, multiplayer, and Super Game Boy enhancements, but saw the uneven combination of simple and complex puzzles within a single level to be a negative point.

A writer for Total! stated that "Nintendo's idea of having the puzzles take place above and below ground is not only new, but also surprisingly good". Dave McComb of Nintendo Magazine System (Official Nintendo Magazine) praised the game's visuals for its simple but effective sprites, addictive gameplay, puzzles, boss battles, and two-player mode, but found the audio department to be average and noted the lack of additional replay value. Mega Fun's Ulf Schneider considered Mole Mania to be difficult puzzle game, noting that each level requires a very planned approach. Schneider celebrated its multiplayer, bonus rounds, and battery backup support. IGN's Steve Averett gave the game positive remarks for its audiovisual presentation, non-linear format, and versus mode.

=== Retrospective coverage ===
Retrospective commentary for Mole Mania has been equally favorable. 1Up.com's Nick Todd compared the game to Adventures of Lolo when it comes to gameplay. Nintendo Life's Philip J. Reed commended the game for its crisp visuals, amusing cutscenes, and soundtrack. However, Reed found the ability to dig above ground and below ground occasionally frustrating. He also felt its controls were troublesome during bonus rounds and boss battles. MTV's Jason Cipriano praised the game's short and to-the-point puzzles. Cubed3's Shane Jury highlighted the game's animated cutscenes, upbeat music, and versatile controls. Hardcore Gaming 101's Charles P. Gill wrote that "Mole Mania is the result of what happens when smart game developers take a very simple premise and think of how to expand it in millions of smart ways".
