= Mecho Wars =

2009 video game

- App Store icon
- Developers: Oyaji Games (iOS); Flying Tiger Entertainment (WiiWare, DSiWare); Creat Studios (PSP)
- Publishers: Oyaji Games (iOS); Creat Studios (PSP)
- Director: Luc Bernard
- Designers: Luc Bernard; Shane Gill; Sean Reid
- Series: Mecho
- Platforms: iOS, Windows, Mac OS X, PlayStation Portable
- Release: iOS; June 13, 2009; Windows, Mac OS X December 11, 2010; PlayStation Portable: NA: January 10, 2012; EU: January 25, 2012
- Genre: Strategy
- Mode: Single-player

Mecho Wars is a turn-based strategy video game developed by British studio Oyaji Games and designed by Luc Bernard which is set in the same world as Eternity's Child. It was released for iOS on June 13, 2009. It was released on PlayStation Minis on January 10, 2012, in North America and January 25, 2012, in Europe. It was also released on December 11, 2010, on PC and Mac.

== Gameplay ==
Screenshot

The game is based on standard turn-based strategy combat but with environmental factors affecting gameplay. For example, at night the water freezes, and every turn an hour goes by. The game features two campaigns one controlling the 'Winged Crusade' and one controlling the 'Landians'.

== Soundtrack ==
The Mecho Wars soundtrack was composed by Sean Beeson, with additional music provided by Justin Wasack, Pontus Rufelt, AF THE NAYSAYER, Aidin Ashoori, and vocals by Genna Bain. The sound effects were created by Justin Wasack.

The WiiWare version features an exclusive song.

== Awards ==
Mecho Wars was nominated for Best Handheld Audio for the 2010 GANG Awards, up against Jak & Daxter: The Lost Frontier, The Secret of Monkey Island: Special Edition, Gran Turismo PSP and Resistance: Retribution.

== Reception ==
Reviews for Mecho Wars have been generally positive. It received a score of 4 out of 5 from appvee.com. Gamerlimit.com gave Mecho Wars an 8.5 out of 10 Appversity said "where UniWar brought a bland, but solid entry to the TBS genre, Mecho Wars counters with a flashy and vibrant style. With this style and the innovative time twist, I can safely say that upon the release of online multiplayer, Mecho Wars will be a must-have". Slide To Play gave the game a 4 out of 4. Meanwhile, PSPminis.com gave it a 9/10 for the PlayStation Minis version saying "Mecho Wars is very polished and full of content."

== Remake ==
A remake named Desert Ashes was released in February 2015 for PlayStation Vita, and for the Nintendo Switch in January 2019.
