= Gangland =

Gangland or Gang Land may refer to:

- Organized crime, relating to, or carried out by organized criminals
- Gangland (video game), a 2004 computer game from Mediamobsters
- Gangland (TV series), a documentary show on the History Channel that ran from 2007 to 2010
- Gangland (film), a 1998 Filipino movie directed by Peque Gallaga and Lore Reyes
- Gangland, 1998 4-issue comics anthology from Vertigo at DC Comics
- Gangland (album), a 2001 album by Kool & the Gang
- Gangland, a series of mixtapes by Chevy Woods
- "Gangland", a song by Future on the mixtape Monster
- "Gangland", a song by Iron Maiden on the album The Number of the Beast
- "Gangland", a song by Tygers of Pan Tang on the album Spellbound

== See also ==
- Gangland killing, euphemism for organized crime murders
