= Abdol Hossein Sardari =

Iranian statesman and diplomat (1914–1981)

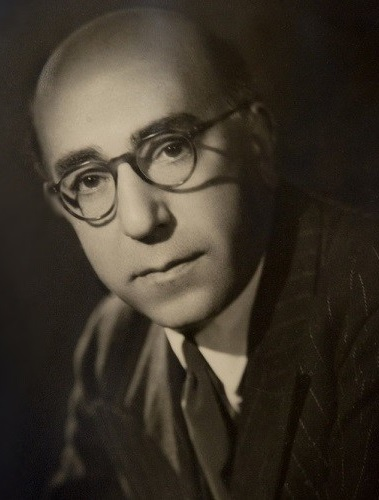

Ambassador of Iran to Belgium
- In office 2 October 1945 – 1 October 1948
- Monarch: Mohammad Reza Pahlavi
- Preceded by: Abdollah Bahrami
- Succeeded by: Mostafa Samii

Personal details
- Born: 1914 Tehran, Qajar Iran
- Died: 1981 (aged 66–67) Nottingham, England, United Kingdom
- Relatives: Amir Abbas Hoveyda (nephew); Fereydoun Hoveyda (nephew)
- Education: University of Geneva
- Occupation: Diplomat

Abdol Hossein Sardari (Persian: عبدالحسین سرداری; 1914–1981) was an Iranian diplomat. He is credited with saving thousands of Jews in Europe, issuing to Iranian Jews in France new passports that did not state their religion as well as issuing hundreds of Iranian passports for non-Iranian Jews. He has since been known as "The Persian Schindler" or "The Schindler of Iran".

== Early life and family ==
Sardari was born in 1914 in Tehran to a well-to-do aristocratic family. His mother, known as Afsar-Saltaneh, was a niece of Naser al-Din Shah Qajar (r. 1848–1896). His father was Soleyman Adib-ol-Saltaneh. His parents had four sons and three daughters; Sardari was the second youngest son. At eight years old, he was sent to a boarding school in England; he then moved to Switzerland where he studied law at University of Geneva, graduating with a law degree in 1936. During his time in Switzerland, he entered the Iranian Foreign Service in that country.

Sardari was the uncle of Iranian prime minister Amir Abbas and diplomat Fereydoun Hoveyda.

== Career ==
Sardari became an Iranian diplomat in Paris in 1937. As the Holocaust struck, which eventually led to the crippling of the embassy, he decided to remain in Paris while many of his colleagues in the embassy fled to Vichy, France (a safer city at the time). The Nazi invasion of France also led to the departure of Iran's ambassador in Paris, who was Sardari's brother-in-law, which led to the affairs of the embassy being left to Sardari.

Sardari was in charge of the Iranian consular office in Paris in 1942. There was a sizeable community of Iranian Jews in Paris when German forces invaded and occupied the city.

Leaning on the national socialist perception that Iranians were Aryan, Nazi Germany had also declared Iranians to be immune to all Nuremberg Laws since 1936, as they were "pure-blooded Aryans" according to their racial theory. The Iranian government under Reza Shah was able to protect Iranian Jews, whose families had been present in Iran since the times of the Persian Empire. (Cyrus the Great personally ordered the Jews of Babylon to be freed from Babylonian slavery.) He very strongly argued this point to the Germans and specifically ascertained that the Iranian Jews were protected under these statutes. The Nazis grudgingly agreed, and accordingly, many Iranian Jews were saved from harassment and eventually deportation by the Nazi regime.

Once he realized the full nature of the Nazis' ambitions, Sardari began issuing hundreds of Iranian passports for non-Iranian Jews to save them from persecution. To safeguard his plan, he did not ask for permission, and felt that support by the Iranian leadership was implied. His actions were later confirmed and applauded by the government of Iran. Sardari helped roughly 1,000 Iranian Jewish families escape the Nazi-occupied country, as well as many non-Iranian Jews.

== Operation to rescue the Jews ==
Sardari's first step to help Iranian Jews in France was to issue them with new passports that did not state their religion. Ibrahim Morady, an Iranian Jewish merchant that was saved by Sardari, stated that Sardari was asked by Iran's Foreign Ministry to return to Iran. Sardari refused to leave the Jews behind and feared that they would be deported. He began issuing hundreds of Iranian passports for non-Iranian Jews as well, to protect them from the Nazis. In hopes of protecting them from persecution, Sardari issued passports and signed affidavits for as many Iranian and non-Iranian Jews as he could.

Sardari was determined to free the Iranian Jews and get them out of France immediately. He did so by making use of his political position. He argued that the Iranian Jews did not belong to Hitler's "enemy race" - that they were not Jewish and that they were in fact "Djougoutes" (a fabricated race of Muslim Iranians). He argued that they were not of Jewish descent and that in Iran they have the same civil, legal, and military rights and responsibilities as Muslims. As it turned out, many senior Nazis in Berlin agreed with this. Though Sardari formulated this argument in hopes of sparing the Iranian Jews, he did just as much to help non-Iranian Jews escape the horrors of the war.

His efforts to help the Jews of France went as far as hiding their belongings for them. When the Germans attacked France, Sardari told a man who went by the name of Haim Sassoon that he would hide the Jewish man's antiquities in the embassy or the basement of his own house during the war. When the Germans were no longer in France, Sardari called Mr. Sassoon and said to him, "You could now come and collect your belongings”.

== Post-World War II ==
When World War II ended, Sardari worked in Brussels, Belgium for the Iranian Diplomatic Corps.

Later in life, his lover, Tchin Tchin (Chiao-Yen Chow), was a Chinese opera singer. She disappeared during the Chinese Civil War in 1948 when she travelled to China to receive a blessing from her parents to marry Sardari.

In 1952, Sardari had to return to Tehran, Iran and was charged with misconduct for issuing Iranian passports during the war. Consequently, his career was damaged until he was able to restore his reputation in 1955. Shortly thereafter he retired from the Iranian Diplomatic Corps and moved to London. Following the Iranian Revolution of 1979, Sardari's nephew Amir Abbas Hoveyda was executed by the new Islamic regime, and all of his belongings in Iran were destroyed

Following the Iranian Revolution of 1979, Sardari lived in exile in London in poverty, after losing his ambassador's pension and Tehran properties.

Sardari spent his final years in exile in England, initially living in modest circumstances in a bedsit in Croydon, south London, before moving to Nottingham to be closer to family. His place of death is disputed among reliable sources: the United States Holocaust Memorial Museum reports he died in London in 1981, while other accounts, including family recollections reported in news sources and linked to the documentary ''Sardari's Enigma'' (2017), place it in Nottingham around the same time (with cremation recorded in 1983).

== Comparison to other rescuers of Jews during the Holocaust ==
Abdol Hossein Sardari (the "Iranian Schindler"), Chiune Sugihara (the "Japanese Schindler"), and Oskar Schindler share many similarities in their methods and what happened to them after the war. All three are seen as unlikely rescuers of Jews during the Holocaust who at great personal risk saved people using their ingenuity, their position, and diplomatic and other loopholes. After the war, all three suffered professional and financial hardships, none publicised their war time rescues, received help from people they had saved, and received wider recognition mostly after their deaths.

== Honors ==
In April 1978, three years before his death, Sardari responded to queries from Yad Vashem, Israel's national Holocaust memorial, about his wartime actions:

As you may know, I had the pleasure of being the Iranian Consul in Paris during the German occupation of France, and as such it was my duty to save all Iranians, including Iranian Jews.

— — Abdol Hossein Sardari (response to Yad Vashem, April 1978)

In the 1990s and 2000s, Sardari received posthumous recognition from Jewish organizations, including a 1994 ceremony at the Simon Wiesenthal Center for Tolerance in Los Angeles and a 2004 Plaque of Appreciation presented to his nephew Fereydoun Hoveyda during Yom HaShoah commemorations.

However, his name has not been added to Yad Vashem's list of Righteous Among the Nations. The director has said that they had 'found insufficient documentation to award him the title of Righteous Among the Nations.'

== In Popular Culture ==
The 2007 Iranian TV series Zero Degree Turn (Madare sefr darajeh) was loosely based on Sardari's actions in Paris. The focus of the series is an Iranian student who falls in love with a Jewish woman while studying in France during World War II and later desperately looks for ways to save her and other Jews from the imminent threat of deportation.

In 2023 it was announced that Abdol Hossein Sardari would feature in an exhibit within the upcoming Fortnite Holocaust Museum.
