= The Light in the Darkness =

2023 educational video game about the Holocaust

- Publisher: Voices of the Forgotten
- Director: Luc Bernard
- Producers: Lexy Graves, Chantal Paz
- Writer: Lexy Graves
- Engine: Unreal Engine
- Platforms: PlayStation 4, PlayStation 5, PC (Steam, Epic Games Store)
- Release: 2023
- Genre: Educational
- Mode: Single-player

The Light in the Darkness is a 2023 educational video game created by French designer Luc Bernard. It tells the story of a Polish-Jewish family during the Holocaust in Nazi-occupied France. The game blends interactive storytelling with historical material, including archival photographs and documents, and is designed to teach young players about the Holocaust through an emotional, narrative-driven format.

The game was published by Voices of the Forgotten, a nonprofit founded by Bernard to promote Holocaust education through digital media.

== Gameplay ==
The game blends linear storytelling with brief dialogue options and small-scale interactive moments. However, it deliberately avoids traditional branching narratives or win conditions in order to reflect the historical reality and lack of agency faced by Holocaust victims. Bernard has described the experience as "an interactive film," stating, "there's no gamifying the Holocaust, there's no winning the Holocaust."

== Development ==
The game began as an unreleased prototype titled Imagination Is the Only Escape, originally announced in 2008 for the Nintendo DS. That version was designed to follow a young Jewish boy in Nazi-occupied France and teach children about the Holocaust. It drew early attention for its controversial subject matter but was never published.

Years later, Bernard revisited the concept, evolving it into The Light in the Darkness — a more grounded and historically focused experience. The final game was released in 2023 as a free download.

As of 2025, a Director's Cut is in development and will be released on September 22, 2026 for PC and PlayStation 5.

== Reception ==
The game was widely praised by critics and media outlets for its emotional impact and educational value. Variety profiled Bernard's use of games to engage young people with Holocaust history. The Economist called the game "a new way to educate young people about the Holocaust." Reviews emphasized the game's respectful approach to the subject matter and its potential to spark critical discussion.

== See also ==
- Luc Bernard
- Voices of the Forgotten
- Holocaust education
