= Adventures of Lolo 3 =

1990 video game

- North American box art
- Developer: HAL Laboratory
- Publisher: HAL Laboratory
- Series: Eggerland
- Platform: Nintendo Entertainment System
- Release: JP: December 26, 1990; NA: September 1991; EU: May 27, 1992
- Genre: Puzzle
- Mode: Single-player

Adventures of Lolo 3 is a 1990 puzzle video game developed and published by HAL Laboratory for the Nintendo Entertainment System. It is the ninth installment of the Japanese Eggerland series, as well as the fifth to be released in Europe and the third to be released in North America. The North American version of the game reused new gameplay elements, cutscenes, and graphics from the Japanese-only Adventures of Lolo 2 (unrelated to the American Adventures of Lolo 2).

The Japan-exclusive Adventures of Lolo 2, (Note: Japanese: アドベンチャーズ オブ ロロ 2, Hepburn: Adobenchāzu obu Roro 2; that is Adventures of Lolo 2) on the other hand, is a different game. It has a different difficulty curve and featured completely different stages. It was released for the Famicom and it is the eighth installment in the Eggerland series. New gameplay elements, later re-used in the American Adventures of Lolo 3, were added to make the base gameplay deeper than before.

== Synopsis ==
Lolo and Lala are enjoying some time together when the Great King of Eggerland's son and heir throws a potion on all of Lolo and Lala's friends, turning them to stone. Lolo and Lala return home to see the damage that the Great King's son and heir has done and embark on a quest to stop him and return their friends to normal.

== Game information ==
The player has the ability to select between playing as Lolo or Lala in the levels by pressing the "A" or "B" button when on the overworld map. Neither character has any advantage over the other, however, the only difference being the character dialogue in the tutorial levels.

Two changes to the gameplay included the crumbling bridge, which is a bridge that can only be crossed two times before it crumbles into nothingness. The other change was a new monster called Moby. Mobies only appear in the underwater levels and use a line of sight attack that sucks Lolo in towards them. Though not directly a fatal attack, it can cause Lolo to get stuck and have to restart the room.

When pressing Select to give up, Lolo does not actually die this time. Instead, a short "give up" tune plays and the level restarts. Pressing Start will return the player to the overworld map. Pressing Start again reveals the password to that point in the game. Adventures of Lolo 3 uses 16-character passwords instead of four-character ones.

Unlike the previous game, there is no limit on lives. The player may restart the level as many times as desired without returning to the title screen.

The game features a total of 17 levels with 100 different puzzle rooms, nine boss rooms, and ten training rooms. Levels 3, 13, and 17 have ten rooms each. The other levels only have five rooms. Levels 4–7, 9–12, and 17 have a boss at the end. The two big trees on the overworld map are where the training rooms are, each tree having five rooms each.

== Reception ==
Reception

Review scores
Publication	Score
Electronic Gaming Monthly	8/10, 8/10, 7/10, 7/10
Famitsu	6/10, 7/10, 7/10, 7/10
Hippon Super!	7/10

Dylan Cornelius of Questicle wrote that Adventures of Lolo 3 is "worth every penny". Lee Evans of Downwards Compatible wrote: "If you like puzzlers, the Lolo series is a ton of fun, and Adventures of Lolo 3 is a standout".

Entertainment Weekly gave the game an A, and later picked the game as the #10 greatest game available in 1991.
