= Fereydoon Hoveyda =

Iranian diplomat, writer and thinker

- فریدون هویدا
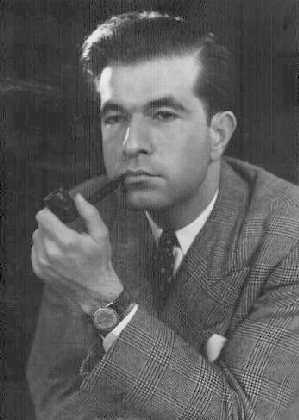

Permanent Representative of Iran to the United Nations
- In office 1971–1979
- Prime Minister: Amir-Abbas Hoveyda; Jamshid Amouzegar; Jafar Sharif-Emami; Gholam Reza Azhari; Shapour Bakhtiar
- Preceded by: Mehdi Vakil
- Succeeded by: Mansour Farhang

Personal details
- Born: 21 September 1924 Damascus, State of Syria
- Died: 3 November 2006 (aged 82) Clifton, Virginia, United States
- Party: Rastakhiz Party
- Relations: Amir-Abbas Hoveyda (brother)
- Occupation: Diplomat, writer, film critic
- Website: Official website

Fereydoon Hoveyda (Persian: فریدون هویدا Fereydūn Hoveyda, 21 September 1924 – 3 November 2006) was an Iranian diplomat, writer and thinker. He was the Iranian ambassador to the United Nations from 1971 until 1979. He was the younger brother of the 37th prime minister of Iran, Amir-Abbas Hoveyda.

== Early life and education ==
Hoveyda was born in Damascus on 21 September 1924 where his father, Habibollah Hoveyda, was the Consul-General of Persia. His mother was Afsar-ol-Molouk Fatmeh, a Qajar princess. Upon marriage his father was given the title of Ayn al-Molk (Eye of the Kingdom) by the Qajar ruler of the country.

His elder brother, Amir Abbas Hoveyda, a former prime minister of Iran under the Shah, was executed after the Iranian Revolution in 1979. They were nephews of Iranian diplomat Abdol Hossein Sardari, who is known for saving many Jews in Paris during World War II.

Fereydoun Hoveyda was raised in Lebanon, Saudi Arabia, and Iran. He completed a Ph.D. in international law and economics at the Sorbonne, Paris, France in 1948.

== Career ==
Hoveyda joined the foreign ministry in the early 1940s. A participant in the final drafting of the Universal Declaration of Human Rights, he worked in UNESCO from 1951 to 1966. In the late 1960s, he returned to Iran and worked in the Iranian Foreign Ministry as the undersecretary for international and economic affairs. He was also deputy foreign minister. From 1971 to 1979 he represented Iran at the United Nations.

Having been forced out of the Iranian Foreign Ministry following the 1979 revolution, Hoveyda became a senior fellow and member of the Executive Committee of the National Committee on American Foreign Policy (NCAFP).

Apart from politics, he was active in the field of cinema and was a founding member of the editorial board of the celebrated film magazine Cahiers du cinéma.

== Works ==
Hoveyda was a well-known author of 18 novels and non-fiction books in French, English, and German.

- HISTOIRE DU ROMAN POLICIER, 1965
- Fereydoon, Hoveyda (1967). Dans une terre étrange. p. 157.(in French)
- Les quarantaines, 1962 (French Edition) ISBN 978-2-070-23254-3
- Les Neiges du Sinai, 1973 (French Edition) ISBN 978-2-070-28537-2
- Fereydoun, Hoveyda (1980). The Fall of the Shah. Wyndham Books. p. 221. ISBN 978-0-671-61003-6.
- Que Veulent les Arabes? (What do Arabs Want?), 1991 (French Edition) ISBN 978-2-876-91140-6
- Fereydoon, Hoveyda (1992). L'islam bloqué. R. Laffont. p. 249. ISBN 978-2-221-07411-4.(in French)
- The Sword of Islam
- Le Glaive de l'Islam ISBN 978-2-207-23018-3
- War and American Women : Heroism, Deeds and Controversy, 1997 (Co-authored with William Breuer) ISBN 978-0-275-95717-9
- The Broken Crescent: The Threat of Militant Islamic Fundamentalism, 1998 (Co-authored with Loustaunau, Martha O) ISBN 978-0-275-95837-4 S
- The Hidden Meaning of Mass Communications (2000)
- The Shah and the Ayatollah: Islamic Revolution and Iranian Mythology (2003)
- Dead End Islam

He was also the cowriter of the screenplay for Roberto Rossellini's 1959 film India.

== Personal life and death ==
Hoveyda wed twice. His first spouse, Touran Mansour, with whom he married in the 1940s was the daughter of Ali Mansur, one of the prime ministers of Iran.

Hoveyda died in Clifton, Virginia on 3 November 2006 at age 82 after a long fight against cancer. He left behind his second wife, Gisela and two daughters Mandana and Roxana.
