= Northgard =

2018 video game

- Developer: Shiro Games
- Publisher: Shiro Games (Note: Mobile versions published by Playdigious)
- Platforms: Windows; Linux; Nintendo Switch; PlayStation 4; Xbox One; Android; iOS; MacOS
- Release: 7 March 2018: Windows; 7 March 2018; Linux; 8 March 2018; Xbox One; PAL: 24 September 2019; NA: 4 October 2019; Nintendo Switch; 26 September 2019; PlayStation 4; 3 October 2019; iOS; 13 April 2021; Android; 25 August 2021
- Genre: Real-time strategy
- Modes: Single-player, multiplayer

Northgard is a 2018 real-time strategy video game developed and published by Shiro Games for Windows, Linux, Nintendo Switch, PlayStation 4, Xbox One, Android, iOS and MacOS. Northgard received generally positive reviews upon release. Its continued success inspired a 4X board game called Northgard: Uncharted Lands (2022).

== Gameplay ==
Inspired by Nordic mythology, Northgard is a real-time strategy game where a Viking clan tries to take control over a wild continent. The game contains both single-player and multi-player modes, as well as a story-based campaign, with missions of increasing difficulty and complexity. Each map is divided into different regions, with each containing special resources such as iron, stone, fish, and grain. Each region, however, can only support a fixed number of buildings. The game features dynamic seasons. For instance, farms will stop producing food during winter, while the consumption of wood will significantly increase during the same period. In the story, the player plays as Rig, a prince who seeks to avenge the death of his father the High King at the hands of Hagen, the ruthless leader of Clan of the Raven. The young prince will sail to the island of Northgard to fulfill his mission, and in the process he will meet other clans and creatures. At launch, the game features eleven missions and six playable clans, with another twelve clans available as DLC. There are four victory conditions for the game's standard play mode, which allows players to combat other clans, controlled either by artificial intelligence or other human players.

== Development ==
The game was first announced by developer Shiro Games in August 2016. Northgard was released via Steam's early access program on February 22, 2017. It was released in full for Windows PC on 7 March 2018, and for Linux PCs the following day. Console versions followed with releases on the Xbox One on 24 September 2019, Nintendo Switch on 26 September 2019, and PlayStation 4 on 3 October 2019. Mobile versions were released for iOS devices on 13 April 2021, and Android devices on 23 August. Following the game's release, Shiro supported the game by releasing several downloadable content packs, including one based on Ragnarok in October 2018.

== Reception ==
The game received generally positive reviews upon release, according to review aggregator platform Metacritic. Fraser Brown from PC Gamer compared the game favourably to the Age of Empires series and The Settlers series. He liked the unique gameplay systems, though he found the story to be uncompelling. He concluded his review by saying that "Northgard is a surprising, elegant RTS that's laden with a very dull story." Writing for Rock, Paper, Shotgun, Max Cox wrote that Northgard was "easy to pick up but difficult to master", and one of the best real-time strategy games he had played.

The Academy of Interactive Arts & Sciences nominated Northgard for "Strategy/Simulation Game of the Year" at the 22nd Annual D.I.C.E. Awards.
