= Space Tanks =

- Developer: YawThrust Software Labs.
- Publishers: Alten8, Akella, Pepper Games, Tewi Publishing
- Platform: Windows
- Release: EU: May 30, 2006
- Genre: strategy game
- Modes: Single-player, Multiplayer

Space Tanks – Gladiatoren im All is an artillery strategy game developed by the German-based YawThrust Software Labs. (since 2004 Black Blowfish - Interactive Imbeciles) and published by Pepper Games in Summer 2003, and re-released in 2006 by Alten8. The game pits players against one another or against the computer, using tanks in a futuristic setting. Assuming the role of a tank commander on a tiny planet, the player attempts to win each stage by knocking the opposing player off their planet.

== Gameplay ==
Space Tanks is an artillery game similar to Gravity Wars with a free moving mouse cursor for aiming, selecting tanks, and using the weapon shop. This interface is also used for looking left or right, up and down. An inventory on the heads-up display stores items and weapons.

The weapons in Space Tanks are affected by the planet's gravity and it takes a reasonable amount of trial and error before the player's shots start hitting on target. There are over 30 weapons and 70 tanks in the final game, with each projectile having a different velocity or weight, thus being affected by the gravity in a different manner.

The player is given a budget which is to be used on buying tanks, making repairs and using different weapons. Every time the player wins, they earn more money. Replacement tanks must be purchased, meaning the game can come to a premature end if the player runs out of money to buy replacement tanks.

== Reception ==
Computer Bild Spiele magazine gave the game a 2.02 score of "good", noting that the graphics are passable, the music shrill but varied and a lack of gameplay options. The Combat Judge – a pair of disembodied hands and eyes that fill the screen to applaud – was deemed "silly". Whilst the number of weapons is large, it was felt that the levels (the "solar systems") could have been more varied.
