= India: Matri Bhumi =

1959 film

- Directed by: Roberto Rossellini
- Written by: Fereydoun Hoveyda; Sonali Senroy DasGupta; Roberto Rossellini
- Cinematography: Aldo Tonti
- Music by: Philippe Arthuys
- Release date: 27 June 1959
- Running time: 90 minutes
- Country: Italy
- Language: Italian

India: Matri Bhumi is a 1959 Italian documentary film-fiction hybrid film directed by Roberto Rossellini. The film combines the Neorealist style Rossellini helped develop in his native Italy with poetic voice-over narration. One of the writers of the screenplay was Iranian diplomat Fereydoun Hoveyda. It was entered into the 1st Moscow International Film Festival.

== Plot ==
In its opening titles, the film declares that its actors are all non-professional performers cast from the locations being depicted. Over scenes of modern Bombay, voice-over narration remarks on the thousands of bustling people and praises the Indian people for their racial and religious tolerance before moving into more rural parts of the country, which it calls the real India.

In the first section, the film praises Indian's connection with nature over scenes of men using elephants to clear sections of forest. The elephants are bathed and fed, while the human workers are entertained by a traditional puppet show. We are introduced to a young elephant driver, Devi, a Hindu refugee from East Bengal, who becomes the film's narrator. His elephant mates and he, in turn, courts a local woman and is wed to her in a traditional ceremony. When Devi's wife becomes pregnant, he sends her to live with her mother as Devi doesn't have time to tend to her and also work.

In the second part, the film switches to the foothills of the Himalayas and follows several rivers downstream, referring to both the rivers' source of life-giving water and their spiritual connection with the people. India's history is shown in ancient temples that are slowly eroding into the rivers' waters. The narration references ancient Indian holy books as the film shows the construction of the giant Hirakud Dam, which creates a huge artificial lake. Devi has taken a job as a dam builder, and his wife has given birth. Devi's narration expressed the pride he has for being part of the dam's construction, lamenting the 175 deaths amongst the workers to save the lives of untold people who would've been lost to flooding. Finding a tree stump that will soon be swallowed by the forming lake, Devi writes on it about his journey and feelings. Devi and his wife quarrel over his need to travel for work, lreaving her rootless, and they leave their home beside the dam, traveling west through rice farms, ancient Muslim forts, and jungles.

Life in the jungle is explored in the third section with a new narrator, an 80-year-old man who has lived in his village his entire life. His narration explores life with his wife and grown sons who live nearby, their daily work routines, their religious rituals, and the uneasy relationship the old man has with the local tiger. When iron-mining surveyors come to the village, they disrupt the local people and wildlife, who flee from the noise. Lacking prey, the tiger injures itself trying to predate a porcupine and becomes a man-eater. The old man goes to drive off the tiger before the company-led hunting party can kill it.

Finally, the narrator discusses heatwaves in India, where the wildlife escapes to the rivers to cool themselves in the waters. The narrator tells the story of an old man traveling through barren lands to a city festival with his performing monkey Ramu. The heat causes the old man to die; Ramu is still chained to him as vultures circle above them. Ramu is able to free itself as the vulture swoop in. Ramu finds the way to the city festival, and falls back on its training, dancing for crowds and collecting coins. It tries to rejoin a group of wild monkeys, who reject it. Finally, it is adopted by another owner, who puts Ramu in an acrobatic show.

The film ends as it begins, with narration over imagery of the big modern city, with crowds of thousands of people.
