= Adventures of Lolo =

1989 video game

- North American cover art
- Developer: HAL Laboratory
- Publisher: HAL Laboratory
- Composer: Hideki Kanazashi
- Series: Eggerland
- Platform: Nintendo Entertainment System
- Release: NA: April 1989; EU: 28 December 28 1990
- Genres: Puzzle, action
- Mode: Single-player

Adventures of Lolo (Japanese: アドベンチャーズ オブ ロロ ) is a 1989 puzzle video game developed and published by HAL Laboratory for the Nintendo Entertainment System. It is a compilation of puzzles from Eggerland: Meikyū no Fukkatsu and Eggerland: Sōzō he no Tabidachi. It is the fifth game in the Eggerland series, the third one released in Europe, but the first one released in North America. It was available on the Wii's and Wii U's Virtual Console in North America and in PAL regions, as well as on the Nintendo Switch's Nintendo Classics service.

The game received two direct sequels: the Japanese Adventures of Lolo, which consists entirely of new stages, and the American Adventures of Lolo 2, another collection of stages from earlier Japanese games. However, in 1994, a game titled Adventures of Lolo was released for Game Boy in Europe and Japan, which was not the same game as the original NES version, but rather the tenth installment in the series, with continued additions to the base gameplay.

== Premise and gameplay ==
Lolo (left) up against a snake-like enemy (right)

The player assumes the role of Lolo, a round anthropomorphic creature. Lolo attempts to rescue Princess Lala, who has been kidnapped by the evil King Egger. Lolo travels to Egger's castle, with 50 rooms arranged in 10 floors of five. Within each room, Lolo must collect several hearts in order to open a treasure chest and collect the gem inside, which will open the exit to the next room or floor. Certain heart framers contain items that can be employed to trap or defeat creatures that roam around the mazes. The player must navigate the obstacles in each room and avoid or neutralize several different types of enemies, which vary by movement and attack pattern. All enemies disappear once Lolo picks up the gem. Enemy creatures include Skull, Medusa and Rocky.

The player can move, slide certain blocks around the screen, and fire a limited number of shots at enemies. When an enemy is shot, it becomes encased in an egg for a short time; this can be pushed to a new location, used as a bridge to cross water, or shot again to make it disappear temporarily. Lolo can gain other powers on specific screens, such as the ability to smash rocks or build a bridge. Some enemies are not affected by Lolo's shots.

One life is lost whenever Lolo is shot or touched by certain enemies. Others will not kill him, but can impede his movement by standing still or freezing in place when touched. The player can restart a screen at any time, at the cost of one life.

== Development and release ==
Adventures of Lolo was developed and published by HAL Laboratory for the Nintendo Entertainment System. It was released in North America in April 1989. A Nintendo representative commented that Nintendo was "trying to stretch the kids' imaginations" with Lolo. It was re-released for the Wii's Virtual Console on 8 June 2007 in North America and on 6 August in PAL regions. It was also re-released for the Wii U's Virtual Console in North America on 15 May 2014 and in PAL regions on 21 August, as well as for the Nintendo 3DS in PAL regions on 16 October 2014 and in North America on 8 January 2015. In December 2018, it was re-released for the Nintendo Switch's Nintendo Classics service.

== Reception ==
Adventures of Lolo has received positive reception from critics and fans alike. Lolo's success was surprising to its developer HAL Laboratory. Game, Set, Watch's Todd Ciolek called it the "leader of the [block-shoving] movement", garnering a cult following. IGN called it one of Satoru Iwata's successes, describing it as something that was "all about fun, appeal and simplicity over an abundance of bells and whistles". The Toronto Star listed it as one of their recommended NES games for children. Eurogamer's Dan Whitehead praised it for not being "yet another cutesy platformer", calling it a "diverting casual game". He stated that it was not a "classic title that everyone should rush to own", but it was still a quality title. Writer Justin McElroy commented that he had fond memories of it, and has no worry of how well it has aged since its release on the NES, feeling that puzzle games stay "enjoyable forever"; however, he criticized the music, saying that its looping drove players "ever closer to the dark edge of madness". GameSpot's Frank Provo called it addictive, commenting that the gameplay holds up in the current day. He added that while the characters were cute, the graphics were simple, and that the game could be finished in one day. Wired's Chris Kohler called its Virtual Console release a "tempting choice". IGN's Cam Shea said that it was not worth paying for, though it had more value than many other Virtual Console titles. IGN's Levi Buchanan named it one of the best Virtual Console titles, saying that it will last for hours.

Author Steven Schwartz called Lolo a strategic game, and that players who have successfully done logic problems in magazines would have an easier time with this game. Similarly, Dennis Lynch of the Chicago Tribune called it a "challenge of logic, not brute force", as well as "addictive". He also noted that Lolo was a game that would appeal to both genders. 1UP.com's Jeremy Parish called it a great puzzle game, calling it "highly recommended" due to its combination of its complexity and simplicity. IGN's Lucas M. Thomas felt that it would be intriguing to fans of puzzle-action games, calling it "simple on the surface, but deceptively complex once you get going". GameSpy's Benjamin Turner commented that it was "hard as hell", and would "put any Mensa member to the test". Fellow GameSpy writer Christian Nutt bemoaned HAL for abandoning Lolo for Kirby. Nintendo Life's Darren Calvert called its level designs "ingenious", commenting that they will "tax the old grey matter". Nintendo World Report's Michael Cole commented that its gameplay remained fresh in its Wii release, as well as "approachable".

Adventures of Lolo's gameplay has been compared to several other video games by critics. GamePro's Heidi Kemps compared Ivy the Kiwi?'s gameplay to Lolo's. Selby Bateman of Game Players magazine compared the adventurous experience of Lolo to Zelda II: The Adventure of Link, calling the former more sophisticated. 1UP.com's Kevin Gifford compared it to Wrecking Crew. IGN compared Kickle Cubicle to Lolo, though noting that it was easier. Writer Danny Cowan compared the video game Roll Away and said that it was similar to the "find the key/find the exit" gameplay of Lolo. It has also been the inspiration for other video games; video game developer Ryan Clark attributed the inspiration for his video game Professor Fizzwizzle in part to Adventures of Lolo. LIT developer Adam Tierney drew inspiration for LIT from Lolo.

== Legacy ==
Adventures of Lolo was followed by two sequels for the Japanese Famicom and two sequels for the NES: the Japanese Adventures of Lolo and Adventures of Lolo 2, consisting of new stages, the American Adventures of Lolo 2 (another compilation of stages from earlier games) and Adventures of Lolo 3 (based on the Japanese Adventures of Lolo 2, but consisting mostly of new stages). A Game Boy follow-up was released in 1994 in Japan as Lolo no Daibouken, but it was localized with the same name, Adventures of Lolo.

Lolo and Lala, the game's protagonists, have appeared under the monikers Lololo and Lalala in Kirby's Dream Land and later in its adaptation in Kirby Super Star and its remake Kirby Super Star Ultra, as well as in Kirby's Avalanche and Kirby's Blowout Blast, where they play an antagonistic role. After these appearances, they have remained as occasional recurring characters in the Kirby series, making cameos in various installments, and becoming playable for the first time in Kirby Air Riders. Both game series are made by HAL Laboratory.

In the Kirby series' anime adaptation: Kirby: Right Back at Ya!, both Lololo and Lalala appear as Fololo and Falala where they were born under similar circumstances from a monster named Fofa, who was split in two by Slice n' Splice in order to offload a useless monster to King Dedede, who then dumped them into Sir Ebrum and Lady Like's hands as they were useless to him. Since they are no longer have any affiliation with NightMare Enterprises, Fololo and Falala reside in Dedede's castle alongside the family of Ebrum, Like, Tiff, and Tuff and help with housework. Fololo and Falala are voiced by Chiro Kanzaki and Madoka Akita, respectively, in Japanese and Tara Sands in English.
