= Adventures of Lolo 2 =

1990 video game

- North American box art
- Developer: HAL Laboratory
- Publisher: HAL Laboratory
- Composer: Hideki Kanazashi
- Series: Eggerland
- Platform: Nintendo Entertainment System
- Release: JP: January 6, 1990; NA: March 1990; PAL: February 21, 1991
- Genre: Puzzle
- Mode: Single-player

Adventures of Lolo 2 is a 1990 puzzle video game developed and published by HAL Laboratory for the Nintendo Entertainment System. It is the seventh installment of the Japanese Eggerland video game series, as well as the fourth in the series to be released in European countries and the second to be released in North America.

== Gameplay ==
Gameplay screenshot

Gameplay is virtually identical to the previous Adventures of Lolo (US), since both are compilations of puzzles from Eggerland: Meikyū no Fukkatsu and Eggerland: Sōzō he no Tabidachi. Some of the monster graphics were drawn differently, mainly Gol, Rocky, Skull, Medusa, and Don Medusa. Other differences include new puzzles and greater difficulty.

The game features a total of 50 different puzzle rooms; the player faces King Egger at the end. Also featured are four hidden Pro puzzle rooms, which are available for players who want to try very challenging rooms.

== Release ==
Adventures of Lolo 2 was released in Japan on January 6, 1990. And in the United States in March 1990.

The American Adventures of Lolo 2 was released on the Wii's Virtual Console in 2008 for North America on January 21,

== Reception ==
Reception

Review score
Publication	Score
Electronic Gaming Monthly	7/10, 6/10, 7/10, 7/10

Reviewers in Electronic Gaming Monthly found the game relatively unchanged in terms of gameplay from the first one. While one user said the first game did not get the recognition it deserved, another said the game was not overwhelmingly strong in terms of graphics, gameplay or music and only recommended it to puzzle game fans.
