= Gangland (video game) =

2004 video game

- Developer: MediaMobsters (Note: Ported to Mac by Virtual Programming.)
- Publisher: Whiptail Interactive
- Platforms: Windows, Mac OS X
- Release: Windows: EU: February 27, 2004; NA: March 3, 2004; Mac OS X August 10, 2005
- Genres: Real-time strategy, simulation, role-playing video game
- Modes: Single player, multiplayer

Gangland is a video game created by Danish studio Mediamobsters. It has the premise of mixing real-time strategy, role-playing video game and simulation game.

== Story ==
The player takes the role of Mario Mangano, whose four brothers, Romano, Angelo, Sonny, and the eldest Chico, are caporegime of the Mangano crime family based in Palermo. When their father, the Don of the Borgata, dies, a power struggle hits the family and ends with Chico being nominated as the new boss. Romano, Angelo, and Sonny murder Chico after his promotion and flip away from Italy to the new world, escaping the police manhunt meant to capture them. Two years later, Mario's uncle Vincenzo Mangano calls Mario's grandfather and says that the three brothers are in his city, Paradise City. The single-player campaign begins when Mario is sent to Paradise City by his grandfather to work under Vincenzo until he is powerful enough to hunt down and kill the three murderous brothers.

== Reception ==
Reception

Aggregate score
Aggregator	Score
Metacritic	63/100

Review scores
Publication	Score
Computer Gaming World	3/5
Game Informer	6.5/10
GameRevolution	C−
GameSpot	6.9/10
GameSpy	3/5
GameZone	6.9/10
IGN	5.8/10
PC Gamer (UK)	62%
PC Gamer (US)	68%
X-Play	3/5
Playboy	75%
The Times	3/5

The game received "mixed" reviews according to the review aggregation website Metacritic.

A common criticism of Gangland was its repetitive gameplay. The game also suffered from a poorly implemented checkpoint saving system, as well as game mechanics that would discourage the use of certain units because of future penalties. Some of the actions a player could perform could be considered game breaking actions (such as the permanent destruction of vital resources) that could ruin multiplayer games.

Maxim gave it a score of eight out of ten, saying, "It ain't pretty, but it's business." Playboy gave it 75%, saying, "Think of this strategy game as The Sims meets The Sopranos." However, The Times gave it three stars out of five, saying, "Releasing a game without a save mode is a brave move; releasing a game without a save mode because you forgot is just worrying. For those of you hoping to play Gangland and complete it, my advice is to wait until a save patch becomes available, supposedly in the next month or so."

== Sequel ==
On October 1, 2007, publisher CDV announced that Escape From Paradise City had gone gold and would be available later that month. Escape from Paradise City was developed by Sirius Games.
