= GT Racers =

2004 video game

- GT Racers for Game Boy Advance cover
- Developer: Aqua Pacific
- Publishers: Oxygen Interactive, GBA: Liquid Games
- Platforms: PlayStation 2, Windows, Game Boy Advance
- Release: PlayStation 2, Windows: 2004; Game Boy Advance: 2006
- Genre: Racing
- Modes: Single-player, multiplayer

GT Racers is a 2004 game by British studio Aqua Pacific for PlayStation 2 and Windows and was released in 2006 for Game Boy Advance.
