= Enemy Nations =

1997 video game

- Developer: Windward Studios
- Publisher: Head Games Publishing
- Designer: Dave Thielen
- Platform: Windows
- Release: March 18, 1997
- Genre: Real-time strategy
- Modes: Single-player, multiplayer

Enemy Nations is a 1997 real-time strategy video game developed by Windward Studios and published by Head Games Publishing for Microsoft Windows.

== Gameplay ==
Gameplay screenshot

Enemy Nations is a real-time strategy game in which players compete among alien races to colonise an uninhabited planet. The game features random maps generated on an isometric perspective. The game features a windowing system allowing players to open windows to monitor different locations on the map.

== Plot ==
The development of the Hyperspace-Drive triggers a gold rush-like colonization attempt by Earth governments, only to find that habitable (the game takes these as Earth-like) planets are either homeworlds for other sapient species, or colonies of early-evolved species.

Years of build-up and exploration bears fruit: A habitable, rich and lush world with no sentient race is found. However, almost every race intends to colonize it, and soon a full-scale Galactic war will erupt. To solve the bloodshed, the sapient races agree to a competition:

Every race would dispatch a Rocket Ship with a pre-determined size, mass and equipment, stocked with materials, personnel and equipment to create a city analogous of modern Earth technology and infrastructure. Then without interruption from outer space, the base-cities would engage in conflict, with the victor being granted the ownership of the planet.

== Development and release ==
Enemy Nations was developed by Windward Studios, the studio of lead designer and producer Dave Thielen. Thielen was a former Microsoft developer and led its development as the first title of the studio. He stated that the game was under development from around early 1995, and was inspired by a range of strategy games incluing The Settlers, Transport Tycoon and SimCity. The game was originally created for publisher Viacom New Media, who was acquired by Virgin Interactive Entertainment; Thielen claimed the studio dropped the game after showing the company the final product. Following four months of unsuccessfully seeking a publisher, rights to the game were acquired by Head Games Publishing, a Minnesota company founded in 1996 and had distributed level packs for Quake. The game was showcased at E3 1996. Producer Jonathan Knight stated that the game was designed to allow for the complexity of a resource management and city building game, whilst remaining in the real-time action genre.

In May 1997, Thielen published a statement on the Windward Studios website that alleged Head Games had failed to pay the studio for royalties owed to them. The update, published as a "note to stores" carrying the game, stated the studio was unable to provide support for software bugs on retail copies as they were unable to communicate with the publisher, and that the developer would shut down parts of its website and online services to minimise costs. Head Games responded to state that Windward had failed to provide receipts of marketing expenses to reimburse the company for costs, and would pay royalties to the studio after they updated the game to address bugs. Head Games later stated that they did not owe the development any royalties. Thielen filed for arbitration in November 1998 after they claimed they had not received royalties from Head Games for sales of the game, and received a judgment in their favor. During the dispute, Head Games was acquired by Activision. Thielen stated that the royalty payments were never made.

== Reception ==
=== Sales ===
According to the developer, Head Games made 5 million dollars in sales of Enemy Nations, and surpassed 35,000 units of sales by late 1998. Stores pre-ordered above 100,000 copies of Enemy Nations by January 1997. The game was in development for 18 months.

=== Critical reception ===
Reception

Review scores
Publication	Score
Computer Games Strategy Plus	4/5
Computer Gaming World	3/5
GameSpot	4.7/10
Hyper	79%
PC Games (US)	A
PC PowerPlay	69%
Computer & Net Player	8/10
Online Gaming Review	8/10

Enemy Nations received generally positive reviews upon release.

Computer Gaming World reflected that Enemy Nations was one of the first games to introduce elements of "altitude and cover" into the design of real-time strategy games.

== Legacy ==
The game itself was released as strictly non-commercial and privately redistributable freeware on October 1, 2005. Windward released the source code of the game in the beginning of 2006. The source code and data were released free by Windward Studios under the following limited license: The source code is hosted since 2009 by the Enemy Nations Revival project on Launchpad.net and since 2023 on GitHub. A downloadable, playable release is available from the GitHub repository.
