= Fortnite Holocaust Museum =

Virtual museum in Fortnite

- Fortnite location
- First appearance: Fortnite Creative
- Created by: Luc Bernard

In-universe information
- Other name: Voices of the Forgotten
- Type: Virtual museum

The Fortnite Holocaust Museum, also known as Voices of the Forgotten, is a virtual museum in the video game Fortnite Creative, designed by Luc Bernard and approved by publisher Epic Games. It became available in August 2023.

== Content ==
The museum features photographs and plaques highlighting people who resisted the Nazis, and show visitors examples of Nazi atrocities, such as the Kristallnacht. One room in the museum features a "Hall of Historical Figures" featuring people such as Marianne Cohn and Abdol Hossein Sardari.

On August 3, 2023, The Jewish Chronicle uploaded a trailer for the Fortnite Holocaust Museum, showcasing the displays and the first person & single player perspective of the exhibit. Designer Luc Bernard cited his fears of the misuse of AI as being a driving force behind his attempts to build a virtual Holocaust exhibit.

== Response ==
Fortnite publisher Epic Games approved the project in August 2023. Some critics of the museum have highlighted issues with Fortnite's virtual Martin Luther King Jr. Museum in 2021, where Epic Games disabled emotes following players recording themselves dancing to King's "I Have a Dream" speech. In response to concerns about vandalism of the memorial, Bernard said that many of the game's features would be disabled, arguing that this would make the Fortnite Holocaust Museum better protected than real world monuments.

The Christian Science Monitor commented on the choice of Fortnite as a venue for a Holocaust Museum:

"Fortnite is not an obvious location for a museum about genocide; the popular battle royal game is probably known best for its extensive suite of goofy, gesticulating characters. It's a place where you can find Batman duking it out with a sentient banana peel, and then swinging his arms in a viral victory dance known as the griddy."

== Release ==
The release of the Fortnite Holocaust Museum was delayed following concerns of vandalism by Neo-Nazi internet trolls, particularly after comments from American Holocaust denier Nick Fuentes. It became available on August 14, 2023.
