= Earache: Extreme Metal Racing =

2006 video game

- Developer(s): Data Design Interactive
- Publisher(s): Data Design Interactive
- Platform(s): PlayStation 2, PC
- Release: 27 October 2006
- Genre(s): Racing, vehicular combat

Earache: Extreme Metal Racing is a budget vehicular combat game developed and designed by Data Design Interactive and Metro 3D. It incorporates an extreme metal music soundtrack from artists signed on the Earache Records record label as players race. It has been released on the PC and PlayStation 2. The PC version of the game was packaged in an Earache Compilation set called Worldwide Metal.

== Game Modes ==
Single Race - Single race offers straightforward competitive action on any of the tracks.

Time Trial - The player races against their own previous times on a map.

Challenge - A series of 3 successive races. After each race, points are awarded according to the finished position. The player with the most points at the end is the tournament winner.

Death Match - Free-for-all deathmatch. Each player has 3 lives and once they have been destroyed, they are removed from the game.

Zombie Massacre - Players compete to destroy zombies.

Death Race - To win, all competitors must be destroyed before they complete a lap of the track.
