= Everspace =

2017 video game

- Developer: Rockfish Games
- Publisher: Rockfish Games
- Designer: Hans-Christian Kühl
- Engine: Unreal Engine 4
- Platforms: macOS; Microsoft Windows; Xbox One; Linux; PlayStation 4 Nintendo Switch; Google Stadia; Amazon Luna
- Release: macOS, Windows, Xbox One; 25 May 2017; Linux; 9 May 2018; PlayStation 4; 22 May 2018; Nintendo Switch; 11 December 2018; Luna; 12 November 2020; Stadia; 1 December 2020
- Genres: Space combat, roguelike
- Mode: Single-player

Everspace is a 3D space shooter with roguelike elements, developed and published by German studio Rockfish Games. It was released in 2017, while the sequel, Everspace 2 was released in 2023.

== Gameplay ==
Everspace is a space combat game, in which the player progresses through a number of sectors with increasing difficulty. In this game, the player is expected to die. With each death, they can spend earned credits toward Perks, which, in turn, facilitate their following run. The player can find weapons and add-ons that can be used during the current run. The player is also given the ability to craft and upgrade various systems of their ship, including weapons, maneuverability and shielding. An overarching storyline is revealed as the player reaches certain points in a run for the first time. The player can also meet NPCs which give different objectives in order to complete current or future runs and will reward the player once they complete their tasks.

== Development ==
The developer Rockfish was established by Fishlabs founders Michael Schade and partner Christian Lohr. The game had a successful Kickstarter campaign in 2015. It launched in early access via on 14 September 2016 and was fully released on 25 May 2017 for macOS, Microsoft Windows, and Xbox One. A version for Linux was made available via GOG on 9 May 2018. A PlayStation 4 port was released on 22 May 2018. A port for Nintendo Switch, subtitled Stellar Edition, launched on 11 December 2018. Everspace was made available for Amazon Luna on 12 November 2020. A version for cloud-based console Google Stadia was made available on 1 December 2020.

== Reception ==
Reception

Aggregate score
Aggregator	Score
Metacritic	PC: 79/100; XONE: 84/100; PS4: 78/100; NS: 78/100

Review scores
Publication	Score
Destructoid	6.5/10
Eurogamer	8/10
GameRevolution	9/10
IGN	8.6/10
Nintendo Life	8/10
Nintendo World Report	9/10

The PlayStation 4 version of Everspace has a score of 78/100 on Metacritic. Anthony Marzano of Destructoid awarded the Nintendo Switch version a score of 6.5 out of 10, saying 'it ultimately is enjoyable' but acknowledging that it would not appeal to a wide audience. Nintendo Life awarded the Switch version a score of 8 out of 10, saying "it performs admirably – if not flawlessly – on Nintendo's console."

== Sequel ==
A sequel, Everspace 2 was released for Microsoft Windows, macOS, Xbox Series X/S and PlayStation 5. It was released on Steam's early access on 18 January 2021, with the full game releasing on 6 April 2023.
