= Evoland 2 =

2015 video game by Shiro Games

- Developers: Shiro Games; Playdigious (iOS, Android)
- Publisher: Shiro Games
- Director: Nicolas Cannasse
- Programmers: Nicolas Cannasse; Bernard Stouls; Philippe Renouil
- Artists: Jeremy Vitry; Etienne Makowski; Anais Maamar; Lucile Lacoste
- Writers: Nicolas Cannasse; Sébastien Vidal
- Composer: Camille Schoell
- Engine: Heaps
- Platforms: Microsoft Windows, OS X, iOS, Android, Apple TV, Nintendo Switch, PlayStation 4, Xbox One, Linux
- Release: Microsoft Windows: WW: August 25, 2015; OS X: WW: December 17, 2015; iOS and Apple TV: WW: February 28, 2018; Android: WW: June 20, 2018; PlayStation 4: WW: February 5, 2019; Linux, Nintendo Switch: WW: February 7, 2019; Xbox One: WW: February 8, 2019
- Genres: Action Adventure, RPG
- Mode: Single-player

Evoland 2: A Slight Case of Spacetime Continuum Disorder is a 2015 role-playing video game developed and published by Shiro Games. Like its predecessor, the 2013 game Evoland, Evoland 2 is a role-playing game that draws influence from a number of different video games, frequently implementing other genres and gameplay styles during its story campaign.

Evoland 2 was first released for Microsoft Windows in August 2015. The two games were packaged together as Evoland: Legendary Edition and released for home consoles and Linux in February 2019.

== Gameplay ==
Evoland 2 is the sequel to the original Evoland, with its graphics style similarly changing as the player travels through time and its varied gameplay styles being revealed as the player moves along the storyline. The scenario is based on time travel and different gameplay styles that are linked to the story and the player's actions. These gameplay styles pay homage to older games that inspired the developers. The game also features a stronger emphasis on narrative than the first.

The player controls Kuro, (Note: All party members' names can be chosen by the player. This article uses the default names for each character.) an amnesiac boy who is found by a girl named Fina. The two travel together and meet different characters, including the demon prince Menos and researcher Velvet, with the ultimate goal of preventing the world's destruction and the end of time itself. Using relics known as Magiliths, Kuro and his party can travel between four different time periods, including the present day, a past war, a dystopian future, and the era of an ancient civilization. Each historical setting is rendered in its own graphical art style, including Game Boy graphics, 8-bit graphics, 16-bit graphics and 3D graphics. By jumping through time, players can change events in the past to alter history and affect the world in the future.

The majority of the game's fighting system revolves around real-time fighting from a top-down angle, similar to The Legend of Zelda. By defeating enemies, Kuro will gain experience points, allowing him to level up and increase his stats, as well as earn Glis, an in-game currency which can be used to purchase items and equipment. During gameplay, Kuro can summon one of his party members to perform a character-specific special ability; these abilities can be used offensively in combat, as well as to solve puzzles. As the game progresses, the player will receive new forms of transportation such as a boat and an airship, allowing them to access more areas of the overworld.

The game will often shift to new genres of play at predetermined points in the story, such as a side-scrolling platform game, a match-three puzzle game, a rhythm game, a vertically-scrolling shooting game, and a fighting game. During the story campaign, players can also attempt to find hidden items scattered around the game world, such as Orikon Ore to forge stronger equipment for Kuro, Maana to upgrade the other party members, and stars that act as bonus collectibles. Additionally, there is a minigame involving cards that one can play as a sidequest, with players able to collect new cards by finding them in chests and winning them from opponents.

== Plot ==
In the year 999, a boy awakens in the home of a girl named Fina, who found him near her village. As he cannot remember anything, she decides to call him Kuro. The two explore the nearby forest to find clues to Kuro's identity, but encounter a demon named Reno, who seeks to destroy humanity. While attempting to stop him, Kuro and Fina inadvertently activate a Magilith relic and are sent back in time 50 years, during a war between the human Empire and the demon kingdom of Demonia. The two protect a small demon girl from imperial soldiers and are imprisoned, but escape with the help of Demonian prince Menos. They regroup at a Demonian military camp, but are ambushed by the Empire and are pulled through time by another Magilith while trying to escape.

The three emerge in the year 1049, finding that an event called "the Great Disaster" wiped out most of the world 50 years prior, including Fina's village. Seeking to prevent this, the group uses another Magilith to return to 999, though Menos is accidentally left in the future. In his place, Kuro and Fina are joined by Velvet, a researcher studying the Magiliths and their creators, the ancient Magi civilization. Velvet takes them to the mad scientist Professor Giro's abandoned laboratory, where they fight and defeat Reno, revealed to be Menos's son who seeks revenge for his father's disappearance. In the lab, they discover a doomsday weapon created by Giro, but Kuro loses control of his body and is compelled to activate it, triggering the Great Disaster.

The three are saved and brought to 1049 by Ceres, the demon girl they previously saved. Ceres explains that the only way to prevent the disaster is by finding the five fragments of the Magi Key, a relic that can remove Giro's weapon from the timestream. Reuniting with Menos, the party travels across time in search of the fragments. While exploring, the group brings the war to a peaceful end, preventing the demons' extinction, and discover that Fina is descended from the Sylphs, a race that exists outside of time. They also travel back 1000 years to the Magi era, learning that the demon race was artificially created by the Magi and that Kuro hails from their time.

After collecting all the fragments, Kuro and his friends give the completed key to Ceres, who uses it to undo the Great Disaster. She also explains she was born with supernatural powers, which Professor Giro stole from her as a child to power the weapon, but she sent him through a time portal and escaped, implying Kuro and Giro are one and the same. With her powers restored, Ceres claims she plans to destroy time itself. Kuro and friends chase her into a time anomaly, where she reveals the Magi built a device that would prevent the end of time by creating a time loop. Hoping to break the endless cycle and allow time to progress, Ceres now seeks to destroy the project, at the risk of potentially destroying the timestream in the process. Kuro confronts Ceres alone, defeating her, but the project is damaged in their battle. Hoping this will be enough to move the timeline forward, Ceres apologizes to Kuro for everything and the two disappear. In the aftermath, the rest of the party returns to the past, where Menos and Velvet have a baby, Ceres, while Fina uses the equipment in Giro's lab to bring Kuro back.

In a post-credits scene, Kuro is shown awakening in Fina's house, suggesting that time has looped once more.

== Development and release ==
Following the success of Evoland, Shiro Games began development on a sequel, seeking to expand the scope and improve on the original's shortcomings. This included extending the length of the game, placing a stronger emphasis on the storytelling and characters, and implementing additional genres and play styles into the gameplay. Evoland 2 was released on PC in August 2015, followed by a port for OS X four months later. A mobile port was released in 2018 for iOS, Apple TV and Android devices by Playdigious, another French video game company. On January 24, 2019, Shiro Games announced that Evoland and Evoland 2 would be packaged together in a single release, titled Evoland: Legendary Edition, and released for PlayStation 4, Xbox One, Nintendo Switch, PC, OS X and Linux the following February.

== Reception ==
Reception

Aggregate score
Aggregator	Score
Metacritic	PC: 74/100 iOS: 76/100

Review scores
Publication	Score
Destructoid	7/10
Hardcore Gamer	4/5
Pocket Gamer	3.5/5
RPGamer	3/5
TouchArcade	5/5
VentureBeat	90/100

Evoland 2 received generally positive critical reception, with aggregate site Metacritic giving the game an average rating of 74 out of 100 for Microsoft Windows and 76 out of 100 for iOS. Reviewers praised the game for its extended campaign compared to its predecessor, and for its use of references to other video games. RPGamer stated "Evoland 2 came up with a good way of integrating its graphical changes into the narrative, and succeeds at being a full-fledged game that shifts between the eras of RPGs." However, some have also criticized the game for relying too heavily on nostalgia.

Evoland 2 was awarded the Innovation Award at 2015's European Indie Game Days.
