= Endless Ages =

2003 video game

- Developer: Avaria Corporation
- Publisher: SummitSoft
- Platform: Windows
- Release: July 1, 2003
- Genre: Massively multiplayer online first-person shooter/role-playing
- Mode: Multiplayer

Endless Ages was a 3D MMOFPS with role-playing elements that was developed by the American game development studio Avaria Corporation. It was the first multiplayer online game to merge first-person shooting and role-playing when it was released for beta in Spring 2001. The game saw its official commercial release on July 1, 2003.

The game included features such as character classes, quests, an auction-based economy, and a player-versus-player combat system.

Originally created by Aaron Boucher under the banner of Avaria Corporation, the game was sold as part of a game engine licensure agreement with Rapid Reality Studios, a now-defunct game development studio. Under Rapid Reality Studios, Endless Ages received a sequel Phylon in June 2007, which failed to receive attention, and soon went offline in August 2007.

In May 2008, Digital Motion Entertainment acquired the rights to the game and re-released it as Endless Ages Reborn. However, the game was cancelled soon after, and the IP was later auctioned for sale.

== Gameplay and story ==
The story of Endless Ages takes place in a world within the afterlife called Iia, shortly after the protagonist's death. Players engage with various human and non-human characters in the game, whom they can work with to fight against NPC-controlled monsters (called "mobs" in-game). Players can also build their class systems using a variety of weapons, powers and technology.

Unlike most MMOs, the game does not have a cohesive backstory, and is limited by the isolated quest system. Generally, the lore suggests that there is a power struggle between the human and non-human races over ruling the worlds players explore.

Players can explore various types of terrain, including islands, caves, and labyrinths. Some of the worlds players explore may also have smaller zones that house creatures with "high risk, high reward" behavior. To prevent gameplay harassment among players, some worlds prevent PvP-based interactions, and generally neither encourages nor allows the looting of other players' possessions. In earlier patches, players were able to purchase or build their own houses, where they can place their items or put them up for sale, creating a self-sustaining marketplace for other players.

== Characters ==
Players run into three types of races in the game:

=== Human ===
Players can choose between a male human or a female human. While male humans offer players proficiency in engineering and melee combat, female humans offer proficiency in crafting and magical arts. Both also offer an average ability in both stealth and damage absorption.

=== Amphibian ===
Players can choose to play as anthropomorphic amphibians to give themselves an edge in evasion and stealth tactics during gameplay at the cost of lesser health and damage points.

=== Blobic ===
A race known for their size, Blobics appear in the game largely as mercenaries, and are also considered to be antagonistic in the story. Players can choose to play as a hulking Blobic if they wish to absorb a lot of damage dealt at the cost of mobility and stealth.

== Reception ==
Reception

Aggregate scores
Aggregator	Score
GameRankings	67%
Metacritic	55/100

Review scores
Publication	Score
GameZone	8.3/10
IGN	5.5/10

Endless Ages garnered "mixed or average" reviews, and holds an average of 55/100 on aggregate web site Metacritic. IGN wrote: "The game was a good concept, one that caught my attention right away, unfortunately it was poorly executed." GameZone called it "affordable and fun".
