= Everspace 2 =

- Developer: Rockfish Games
- Publisher: Rockfish Games
- Director: Uwe Wütherich
- Producer: Caspar Michel
- Designer: Hans-Christian Kühl
- Programmer: Sven Lohse
- Artist: Uwe Wütherich
- Writer: Bernie Duffy
- Composer: Gero Goerlich
- Engine: Unreal Engine 5
- Platforms: Windows; PlayStation 5; Xbox Series X/S; Nintendo Switch 2
- Release: PC; April 6, 2023; PS5, Xbox Series X/S; August 15, 2023; Nintendo Switch 2 August 12, 2026
- Genres: Space combat, action role-playing
- Mode: Single-player

Everspace 2 is an action role-playing video game developed and published by Rockfish Games. A sequel to Everspace (2017), the game was released for Windows in April 2023 and was ported to Xbox Series X/S and PlayStation 5 in August 2023 and to Nintendo Switch 2 in August 2026.

== Gameplay ==
Everspace 2 is a space combat video game played from a third-person perspective. Unlike its predecessor, Everspace 2 does not feature any elements commonly found in roguelike games. The game's world is split into several large levels across a series of star systems, which can be freely explored by players. The player's spacecraft can be equipped with various weapons. Players can purchase new ships from ship dealers using credits. Ship upgrades, such as new guns, secondary weapon, and special attacks, can also be purchased. Ship types are similar to character classes, as each of them has their own unique skills and abilities. When an enemy is defeated, players can collect their resources and gear. As the player progresses, they can equip themselves with better gear and take on tougher enemies.

== Development ==
Everspace 2 was developed by a team of 20 people in Rockfish Games. According to Rockfish, the game had a significantly larger budget when compared to its predecessor. The studio also had to enlist the help of Streamline Studios to develop content for the game due to its expanded scope. The team decided to create an action role-playing game instead of another roguelike game because the team realized that there was a large demand for an open world space combat game like Freelancer.

Everspace 2 was announced by Rockfish Games in August 2019. A crowdfunding campaign on Kickstarter for Everspace 2 was launched in late 2019, raising over €500,000 for the game's development. Originally set to be released on Steam via early access in mid December 2020, it was delayed to January 18, 2021 to avoid competing with Cyberpunk 2077. A free demo for the game, which includes the first five main missions and two side missions, was released in August 2021. The game was released in full for PC on April 6, 2023. PlayStation 4 and Xbox One versions for the game were cancelled as the team did not want to downscale the game for any platform. Rockfish released the game for PlayStation 5 and Xbox Series X and Series S on August 15, 2023. A physical version of the game, published by Maximum Games, is currently scheduled to be released in October 2023. While the game was originally made in Unreal Engine 4 the developers eventually moved to Unreal Engine 5.

== Reception ==
=== Critical reception ===
Reception

Aggregate scores
Aggregator	Score
Metacritic	PC: 81/100; PS5: 80/100
OpenCritic	94% recommend

Review scores
Publication	Score
GameStar	83%
IGN	7/10
PC Gamer (US)	85/100
Shacknews	8/10

According to review aggregator Metacritic, the game received generally positive reviews upon launch. According to OpenCritic, 93% of 30 critic reviews recommend the game.

Renata Price from Vice described the game as "one of the best space shooters in years", lauding its combat, control and map design. Writing for PC Gamer, Ian Evenden described the game as "Diablo in space" and an "expertly crafted space adventure". Jon Bolding from IGN praised the game's gameplay, though he felt its narrative and cast of characters were uninteresting, and criticized its setting for being derivative and unoriginal.

=== Sales ===
By May 2, 2023, the game had sold more than 300,000 copies.
