= Shiro Games =

French video game developer

- Native name: Shiro Games
- Company type: Private
- Industry: Video games
- Founded: 2012; 14 years ago in Bordeaux, France
- Founders: Sebastien Vidal and Nicolas Cannasse
- Headquarters: Bordeaux, France
- Area served: Worldwide
- Products: Evoland, Evoland 2
- Website: shirogames.com

Shiro Games is a video game development company based in Bordeaux, France. The company was founded in 2012 by Sebastien Vidal and Nicolas Cannasse, and developed the Evoland series and Dune: Spice Wars.

== History ==
In 2013 Shiro Games announced that they would be developing a game titled Until Dark, which they described as a "cooperative exploration game" in a vast and mysterious world. In 2014 Shiro Games announced through the game's official website that they had stalled development due to their lack of satisfaction with the game's current design and that they would try to revisit the game as time allowed. Shiro started third-party publishing label Shiro Unlimited in 2023. It received €50m funding from Cathay Capital in October 2022.

== Games ==
=== Evoland ===
Evoland was initially conceived as a game for the 24th Ludum Dare in 2012. As the theme for that year's competition was "evolution", Vidal and Cannasse chose to have game play change as the player progresses, to reflect on the evolution and history of video game RPGs. As a result, the game was chosen as the winner for the 24th Ludum Dare.

The following year an expanded version of Evoland was released for the PC via Steam, which added a longer player time and new bosses. On Metacritic Evoland holds a rating of 61 based on reviews from 27 critics, which indicates "mixed or average reviews". Destructoid gave the game a rating of 7.5 out of 10, writing "A solid game that definitely has an audience. Might lack replay value, could be too short or there are some hard-to-ignore faults, but the experience is fun."

=== Evoland 2 ===
In 2014 Shiro Games announced that they were working on a sequel to Evoland entitled Evoland 2: A Slight Case of Spacetime Continuum Disorder. The game would follow the same game play and format as the first game while introducing a more complex history, new forms of gameplay, and less linearity than its predecessor. The game was released on 25 August 2015.

=== Northgard ===
Inspired by Nordic mythology, Northgard is a real-time strategy game where a Viking clan tries to take control over a wild continent. The game was first released on PC on 7 March 2018. Console versions followed with releases on the Xbox One on 24 September 2019, Nintendo Switch on 26 September 2019, and PlayStation 4 on 3 October 2019. Mobile versions were released for iOS devices on 13 April 2021, and Android devices on 23 August 2021.

=== Darksburg ===
In 2018 at Gamescom, Shiro Games announced the development of Darksburg, a cooperative survival game in a fantasy medieval setting. The early access version was released in February 2020.

=== Wartales ===
Wartales is a medieval open world role-playing game with turn-based combat in which the player leads a group of mercenaries. It was initially announced at E3 2021 and appeared in its PC Gaming Show event. It was released for early access on 1 December 2021, and was released on 12 April 2023. The game was previously available only for Microsoft Windows; however a version for Nintendo Switch released on 14 September 2023 and a version for Xbox Series X/S released on 31 October 2023. By February 2022 (two months after the game's early access release), Wartales sold 100,000 units.

=== Dune: Spice Wars ===
In late 2021, shortly after the release of Denis Villeneuve's Dune movie adaptation, Shiro Games announced that they had been working on a real-time 4X strategy game based on the Dune universe. The game, developed by Shiro Games and published by Funcom, released for early access on the Steam platform on 26 April 2022 and had its full release on 14 September 2023.
