= Eggerland Episode 0: Quest of Rara =

1996 video game

- Developer: Avit
- Publisher: HAL Laboratory
- Platform: Microsoft Windows
- Release: JP: November 16, 1996
- Genre: Puzzle game
- Mode: Single-player

Eggerland Episode 0: Quest of Rara (エッガーランド - エピソード ０ - Quest of Rara, Eggārando Episōdo 0 - Quest of Rara) is a puzzle game released in 1996, developed by Avit and published by HAL Laboratory for Microsoft Windows. It is based on the Japanese Eggerland video game series. This game was the first of three Windows releases and is a demo, consisting of 30 stages, to show players what the full-version release of Eggerland for Windows 95 would be capable of when it was launched in December 1996 (it contained 194 stages). On June 15, 2000, the Windows 98 compatible version of Eggerland for Windows 95 was released under the name Revival! Eggerland. It was later re-released again for Windows ME in November 2001.

== Game information ==
This game features vastly improved graphics from the prior releases, most of which had been released on home consoles that offered inferior graphic capabilities when compared with most personal computers.

The game features a saved game instead of passwords, so players can simply pick up where they left off.

A new object called a Crystal Framer was added. This is a pushable block, like an Emerald Framer, which can block enemy movements and shots. In addition, Rara, or Lala as she is known outside Japan, can shoot a shot and it will be reflected clockwise or counter-clockwise (depending on the type of Crystal Framer). This allows Rara to put monsters such as Medusas or Don Medusas in eggs.

The developer Avit was composed of former Technos Japan Corp staff. They were closely associated with HAL.

== Construction mode ==
The game allows players to create their own "Eggerland" maps with a level creation program known as "Construct Mode". All of the enemies and options that are available in the main game appear in Construction as well as the terrains (and accompanying music). Construction files are saved as Construct.txt which can consequently be emailed to friends and/or shared online, and this has become the norm among many Eggerland communities. The 1996 release of Eggerland for Windows 95 and the 2000–2001 release of Revival! Eggerland included more available terrains and music files, but all releases can load the same files (though Eggerland 0 would not display the new terrain objects from the other versions).

Additionally, players can rename CONSTRUCT.TXT to EGGLAND1.MAP (if using Eggerland for Windows 95/Revival! Eggerland) or EGGLAND0.MAP (for Episode 0). This allowed players to play their custom maps just as they would play the normal game. When they select New Game, the game loaded their custom map instead of the game's default file. Playing a custom map as a .MAP file as opposed to a .TXT file allowed players to save their progress whenever they wish and resume later (this is especially helpful for long and difficult maps). However, they wanted to rename the game's original file to something like EGGLAND1.ORIGINAL.MAP so as not to overwrite the file. They simply needed to revert this in order to play the original game again.
