= Eschalon: Book II =

2010 video game

- Developer: Basilisk Games
- Publisher: Basilisk Games
- Series: Eschalon
- Platforms: Microsoft Windows; Linux; Mac OS X; Cloud (OnLive)
- Release: Windows; May 12, 2010; Linux, Mac OS X May 26, 2010
- Genre: Role-playing
- Mode: Single-player

Eschalon: Book II is a 2010 isometric, turn-based single player role-playing video game by Basilisk Games. Like the first game in the series, Eschalon: Book I, it features a large and openly explorable game world, a comprehensive management of character statistics and skills, and a non-linear storyline. A sequel, Eschalon: Book III, was released in 2014.

== Gameplay ==
Eschalon: Book II is played from an isometric perspective with turn-based combat. The player controls one character that is created at the beginning of the game. Although mostly similar to the first installment of the series there are some notable differences between the two games. Your character now needs to eat and drink to survive, although this can be disabled by an option available in the menu if desired. Similarly, unless an option is selected by the player items and equipment will now degrade with use. Weather effects were also added, with the developer noting that weather is not only a visual effect but will also affect how the game plays. Additional changes include the ability to choose the gender of your character as well as now being playable in 1024x768 resolution.

== Story ==
The story continues directly from the end of Eschalon: Book I, with the same character, but is set a few years later. Although able to repel the Goblin attacks, Thaermore has fallen after being attacked by the Taurax from the neighboring land of Amireth. As such, the game starts in the land Midlande to the north of Thaermore, just outside the town of Eastwillow where the player character purchased a cottage shortly after escaping Thaermore. The game begins with the player discovering a mysterious note left on his doorstep by a man called Darus, which asks the player to meet him at the nearby Wayfarer's Joy Inn. Upon meeting Darus, he explains that he is a part of a mysterious guild known as Cirus Vindica, and that you were also at one point part of this same guild.

He further elaborates that the Taurax invaded Thaermore in order to obtain the "Crux of Ages", a mystical gem stone which, if combined with the other Crux gems, would create a device of great power. Cirus Vindica is sworn to make sure this does not happen, as they believe that the power granted by the device would be too great for anyone to control. The Taurax meanwhile are continuing to build an army to overwhelm the land of Eschalon, in the pursuit of these gems. He also informs the player that it was Cirus Vindica who erased his memory, in the hopes that it would help save the Crux of Ages from falling into the wrong hands. Darus now implores you to fulfill your duty and rejoin the guild. While discussing this, however, an arrow shoots through the Inn window and strikes Darus in the head, killing him instantly. The player finds on his person a strange Viewing glass, as well as the arrow that killed him.

After showing the Viewing glass to Elainise, who works in the local Magik Shop, she directs you to visit her Uncle Minus, who lives on the shores of nearby Greenriven lake, in the hopes that he can help identify it.

== Development ==
Like the first game, the game's development was largely kept secret; Thomas Riegsecker, the developer of the Eschalon series believes that most game developers release too much information about their products, spoiling the game when you eventually play it.

=== Expansion ===
Basilisk Games announced the release of an expansion pack for Book II called "The Secret Of Fathamurk". The expansion adds around 5–10 hours of gameplay to the original content, and it has been released free of charge with the official 1.05 version of the game.

== Reception ==
Eschalon: Book II holds a rating of four out of five stars from The Linux Game Tome. Thomas Riegsecker, who runs Basilisk Games, has also revealed that while the game did sell well, it was not as commercially successful as its predecessor Eschalon: Book I.
