= Evoland =

2013 video game by Shiro Games

- Developers: Shiro Games; Playdigious (iOS, Android)
- Publisher: Shiro Games
- Designers: Nicolas Cannasse; Sébastien Vidal
- Programmer: Nicolas Cannasse
- Artists: Etienne Makowski; Jeremy Vitry
- Writers: Nicolas Cannasse; Sébastien Vidal
- Composer: Camille Schoell
- Engine: Heaps
- Platforms: Microsoft Windows; OS X; Linux; Android; iOS; Nintendo Switch; PlayStation 4; Xbox One
- Release: Microsoft Windows, OS X: WW: April 4, 2013; Android, iOS: WW: February 2, 2015; Linux: WW: March 9, 2015; PlayStation 4: WW: February 5, 2019; Nintendo Switch: WW: February 7, 2019; Xbox One: WW: February 8, 2019
- Genres: Action-adventure, role-playing
- Mode: Single-player

Evoland is a 2013 role-playing video game developed and published by Shiro Games. Evoland was released for Microsoft Windows and OS X in April 2013, Android and iOS in February 2015 and Linux in March 2015.

Inspired by The Legend of Zelda, Diablo and Final Fantasy gameplay, the game has many references to movies and video game history. As the player progresses, they unlock technologies and graphical upgrades that nod towards different eras of the video game industry.

A sequel, Evoland 2, was announced at the end of 2014 and was released August 25, 2015. The two games were packaged together as Evoland: Legendary Edition and released for home consoles in February 2019.

== Gameplay ==
Evoland is based on the concept of tracing the evolution of video games. When the game begins, there are only four colors, simple pixelated graphics, and a 2D character. Through the adventure, the player gradually unlocks graphics, technologies and gameplay until reaching the HD age and a three-dimensional world. This evolution in-game of video game history is punctuated by many references to classic role-playing video games and movies.

The game alternates between action role-playing game-like phases similar to The Legend of Zelda and Active Time Battles like those seen in Final Fantasy. The character moves in a world made up of dungeons, caverns, forests and villages with non-player characters. Players collect the in-game currency Glis after each battle, which can be spent in towns to purchase additional items and upgrades, many of which must be obtained to finish the game. In addition to completing the story mode, players can also attempt to find hidden stars and cards that are scattered around the game world, the latter of which can be used in a collectible card game based on "Triple Triad" from Final Fantasy VIII.

== Plot ==
Players control Clink, (Note: Multiple characters' names can be chosen by the player. This article uses the default names for each character.) a member of the Order of the Dragon Knights who protects the world of Evolandia from evil. While investigating increased monster activity, Clink encounters a girl named Kaeris, who is searching for a magic crystal that will give her the power to save her village. Clink joins Kaeris and they retrieve the crystal from its corrupted guardian, absorbing its power. Clink and Kaeris return to her home of Aogai City, where her uncle Sid informs them that an evil force in the nearby Black Citadel has corrupted the Mana Tree that once protected the country, creating the monsters and causing the area to slowly turn into a wasteland. Needing the Amulet of Gorn to enter the citadel, Clink and Kaeris retrieve its two halves, one from a dungeon beneath the Sacred Grove and one from the lich that haunts the Ruins of Sarudnahk.

Using the amulet to access the citadel, Clink and Kaeris confront the source of the evil power, a man named Zephyros. During the battle, Kaeris is mortally wounded and imbues Clink with her power before dying. Clink summons the dragon Babamut, forcing Zephyros to flee so he can heal. Sid grants Clink use of his airship, and he follows Zephyros to the Mana Tree. There, Zephyros appears in his monstrous true form and explains his people previously ruled Evolandia before being killed for their horns; as the sole survivor, he seeks to destroy the world in retribution for their deaths. Clink kills Zephyros in a final battle, avenging Kaeris's sacrifice and saving Evolandia.

== Development ==
Originally, Evoland was a video game created by Nicolas Cannasse during the 24th Ludum Dare, an "accelerated video game competition". Participants have 48 hours to create a video game respecting a given theme. The 24th Ludum Dare theme was "Evolution". Nicolas Cannasse proposed Evoland in about 30 hours and won first place out of 1400 participants.

The player feedback was very encouraging. Evoland Classic quickly reached over 300,000 players within a couple of months, and is still playable on the Evoland Website for free. Also, as common in Ludum Dare, the Haxe source code was made available, in this case on GitHub.

Given the success of Evoland Classic, Shiro Games decided to create a new version of the game with new bosses and monsters, new play styles, full environment 3D and an extended play-time.

== Release ==
Evoland was first released on Steam and GOG.com at $9.99 on April 4, 2013. In February 2015, the game was ported by Playdigious on iOS App Store and Google Play for $4.99. On January 24, 2019, Shiro Games announced that Evoland and Evoland 2 would be packaged together in a single release, titled Evoland: Legendary Edition, and released for PlayStation 4, Xbox One, Nintendo Switch and PC the following February.

== Reception ==
Reception

Aggregate score
Aggregator	Score
Metacritic	PC: 61/100

Review score
Publication	Score
TouchArcade	iOS: 4/5

The game was received by critics with an average rating of 61 out of 100 on Metacritic. Specialized press and websites acclaimed the potential and originality of the concept as well as the references to cinema and video games history.

According to Destructoid "Evoland's elements form a love letter to some of the most venerated games in their respective genres, and it's surprising just how well the shifting gameplay types work together." Many critics comment on how nostalgia helps make the game excel.

Main criticisms concerned the play-time and the lack of variety. Some players and specialized websites criticized the fact that the game stops evolving much after 30 minutes.

Evoland reached approximately 460,000 sales on Steam alone according to Steam Spy.
