= Escape from Paradise City =

2007 video game

Escape From Paradise City
- Developer(s): Sirius Games
- Publisher(s): NA: CDV Software; EU: Focus Home Interactive
- Platform(s): Windows
- Release: NA: October 24, 2007; EU: October 26, 2007
- Genre(s): Real time strategy, role-playing
- Mode(s): Single-player, multiplayer

Escape From Paradise City is a 2007 computer game created by Danish studio Sirius Games, the sequel to 2004's Gangland. Published by CDV Software Entertainment in North America and by Focus Home Interactive in Europe, it was released in October 2007.

== Reception ==
Reception

Aggregate score
Aggregator	Score
Metacritic	62/100

Review scores
Publication	Score
Eurogamer	5/10
GameSpot	6/10
GameZone	6.7/10
PALGN	6/10
PC Gamer (US)	47%
PC Zone	58%

The game received "mixed" reviews according to the review aggregation website Metacritic.
