= Edge of Twilight =

2016 video game

- Developers: JDJC; Fuzzyeyes Limited
- Publisher: Fuzzyeyes Entertainment
- Series: Edge of Twilight
- Platforms: PlayStation 3 Xbox 360; Microsoft Windows; NVIDIA Shield
- Release: September 29, 2016
- Genre: Action-adventure
- Mode: Single-player

Edge of Twilight is an action-adventure video game developed by JDJC and Fuzzyeyes Limited for PlayStation 3, Xbox 360 and Microsoft Windows. It started development in 2006 and has since been delayed, cancelled, and resurfaced several times. The company has announced the complete development of the game and is seeking funds via crowdfunding to pay off licensing fees so that the game can be released.

Edge of Twilight was initially intended as the first entry in a series of video games of the same name. An iOS prequel, Edge of Twilight: Horizon was released. It was followed by Edge of Twilight: Athyr Above on March 28, 2013, for iOS.

== Plot ==
The world of Hellayem has been ripped in two, the day and night are their own realms. There has been an ancient struggle caused by the greed for an isolated source of energy, between the industrial Atherns and the spiritually inclined Litherns. This struggle was caused by the imprisonment of the Litherns and the ensuing genocide of the Atherns, an apocalyptic event called The Rift. Lex is the only hope of Hellayem, he is the only half breed of these two oppositions and the only one who can exists in both the realms simultaneously. A bounty hunter rejected by society, Lex is caught in the midst of both civilizations and must travel through both realms to save them from destruction.

== Development ==
Edge of Twilight was revealed in 2007 as a third-person action adventure title that blended a post-apocalyptic setting with a steampunk fantasy realm. During 2009, Edge Games sued Fuzzyeyes Studios for the infringement of "EDGE" used in the title. After negotiations between the two parties, an agreement was made between the two parties, resolving the issue. On September 30, 2009, Fuzzyeyes Studios laid off several of its employees and ceased development of all projects. During December 2012, Edge of Twilight was revealed to be not cancelled with a tentative release date of Q2/Q3 2013 and a mobile title called Edge of Twilight: Athyr Above on March 28, 2013, that would serve as a prelude. Edge of Twilight has not been given a release date as of August 2013. Edge of Twilight is being built using the Unreal Engine 3.

In October 2014, a post was made on the game's Facebook page that stated "Eight years ago, we first announced Edge of Twilight... When we first generated the idea for Edge of Twilight, the video game industry was in a time of transition from the existing generation (PlayStation 2 and Xbox) consoles to the so-called next-gen consoles that occupy the market today (PlayStation 3 and Xbox 360). And now, the video game world is moving from current the next-gen consoles to Xbox One and PlayStation 4." And went on to state that the "Australian team had to disband due to legal issues in 2009, heaving the title over an Asian company." It was a huge disappointment to the team since many of them "had to sacrifice their time, breaking up with their lovers, getting committed to mental hospitals, taking drugs, placed under arrest by the police, falling from balcony, getting deported and even getting divorced - all resulting from the stress from the game’s development." Toward the end of 2010, they were able to partner with an outstanding investment company. The team wanted to start working on the title right away, but the board wanted something small first which led to the creation of Edge of Twilight - Athyr Above. Fuzzyeyes stated "We have started building technologies for clients and government parties. However, Edge of Twilight is, and always will be, our biggest goal... and we are still doing everything we can to bring this title out. Every day, we are hoping to share the progress of development to everyone. However we are not allowed to talk about it until publishers give us permission. All we can say for now is we are at the final count down."

Fuzzyeyes has stated that the game was scheduled for release on PC via Steam in June 2016, later changed to September. A version for consoles will be released if their funding goals are reached. Consoles include PlayStation 3, Xbox 360, NVIDIA Shield, PlayStation 4, and Xbox One.

== Related media ==
Edge of Twilight: Athyr Above is the first canon installment in the series. It was released on iOS on March 28, 2013, and will later be released on the Google Play Store. The game involves a large number of puzzles, and gives players the chance to switch between the protagonist, Lex's, Day and Night personas. Players can mix and match combat talents with the game's skill system, as well as including an "easy to use but hard to master" combat system. As well as puzzles, the game is primarily action-based in terms of combat with RPG elements also available.

The first officially released game of the series, Edge of Twilight: Horizon is an "endless running" iOS game, much in the vein of Temple Run. The player takes the role of the protagonist Lex, as his Night persona, as he escapes from the Foresaken, a giant beast, through the forests of Hellayem.
