= Extreme Rock Climbing =

1999 video game

- Developer: Creative Carnage
- Publisher: HeadGames Publishing
- Designers: Carlos Cuello, Andre Lowe, Joe Wilcox
- Engine: Unknown
- Platform: Microsoft Windows
- Release: NA: November 1, 1999
- Genre: Sports
- Mode: Single-player

Extreme Rock Climbing is a sports game developed by Creative Carnage and published by HeadGames Publishing in November 1999. As part of the publisher's Extreme Sports series of budget games, the game simulates rock climbing; and contains sponsorship from the brand PowerBar.

== Gameplay ==
In Extreme Rock Climbing, the player may choose from one of several different game modes, including Free Climb, Capture, Solo Climb, and a practice mode. After that, they can choose from one of many different characters to play as. Then, the player chooses a map, and the game begins. The game is played by using the arrow keys to grab onto one of the rocks on the wall. As the game progresses, the character's health goes down slowly. If it depletes entirely, the player will fall off the rock and lose the game. PowerBars are required to win the game, since they restore the player's health. Once the player reaches the top of the wall, the game rewards them with a congratulations screen and returns to the title menu.

== Reception ==
IGN gave Extreme Rock Climbing a 4.5/10, criticising the graphics and high system requirements. The reviewer noted that the game was the best in the Extreme Sports series.

Allgame gave the game a 1.5/5, only praising the graphics and criticising the variety, gameplay elements and lack of difficulty.
