= Luc Bernard =

British game designer and Holocaust educator

- Born: 26 March 1986 (age 40)
- Occupation: Game designer
- Notable work: Fortnite Holocaust Museum

Luc Bernard (born 1986) is a French-Jewish game designer who created video games such as The Light in the Darkness, Death Tales, Eternity's Child, Mecho Wars, Desert Ashes, Plague Road, Pocket God vs Desert Ashes and SteamPirates. He is also the founder of Voices of the Forgotten, a non-profit organization that develops educational projects focused on Holocaust remembrance and Jewish history through digital media.

== Personal life ==
Bernard is Jewish and an advocate for a number of Jewish causes. He was primarily raised by his maternally Jewish grandmother in England until the age of 10, when he moved to France. When Bernard was 18, he infiltrated a French neo-Nazi street gang to spy on their activities before reporting them to local authorities.

== Works ==
Bernard has created a number of video game projects related to the Holocaust. He created the Fortnite Holocaust Museum, a virtual museum based inside the video game Fortnite which features displays of Nazi atrocities. In 2023, he released The Light in the Darkness, a free educational video game which chronicles the life of a Polish-Jewish family in Vichy France, interspersed with educational material on the hardships French Jews faced during the regime. The project evolved from an earlier unreleased concept titled Imagination Is the Only Escape, which also explored the Holocaust in France.

Bernard is also leading the Anne Frank's Young Voices project, a collaboration between Anne Frank LA and Voices of the Forgotten, inspired by the Holocaust Museum in Fortnite. The program trains and supports students in designing their own virtual Holocaust museums within Fortnite. A pilot launched in December 2024 in the Los Angeles Unified School District, designed to encourage students to engage with Holocaust history through interactive storytelling.

Bernard is currently developing Tears of Libya, a historical narrative game focusing on the experiences of Libyan Jews during World War II.

=== Games ===
- Bernard's first video game was the platformer Eternity's Child.
- Kitten Squad, which he directed for PETA, was released in 2016.
- The Light in the Darkness teaches players about the Holocaust and portrays the experience of persecuted Jews in France.
