= Eggerland =

Series of puzzle video games

- Genre: Puzzle
- Developer: HAL Laboratory
- Publisher: HAL Laboratory
- Platforms: MSX, MSX2, NES, Famicom Disk System, Game Boy, Windows
- First release: Eggerland Mystery; 1985
- Latest release: Fukkatsu! Egger Land; 2000

The Eggerland (エッガーランド) series consists of several puzzle games developed by HAL Laboratory. Its first release was in 1985 for MSX computer systems. The gameplay is almost exactly the same across the series, with only a few changes over the years, mainly graphical.

The hero of most games is Lolo, a blue, spherical character with eyes, arms, and legs. The story mainly deals with King Egger, the villain, capturing princess Lala, who is similar to Lolo, only colored pink or red, and wearing a bow. Lolo must rescue Lala by travelling through Egger's domain and solving the puzzle rooms laid out before him.

== List of titles ==
Release timeline
1985	Eggerland Mystery
1986	Eggerland 2
1987
1988	Eggerland: Revival of the Labyrinth
1988	Eggerland: Departure to Creation
1989	Adventures of Lolo (USA)
1990	Adventures of Lolo (Japan)
1990	Adventures of Lolo 2 (USA)
1990	Adventures of Lolo 2 (Japan)
1991	Adventures of Lolo 3
1992
1993
1994	Adventures of Lolo (GB)
1995
1996	Eggerland Episode 0: Quest of Lala
1997
1998
1999
2000	Eggerland for Windows 95

None of the Japanese games in the Eggerland series were released in North America, and, conversely, none of the three American games were released in Japan. Europe saw the release of three Japanese games, as well as the three American games.

Below is a list of all video games and their respective releases.

Although the graphics and game engine of the Japanese Adventures of Lolo are identical to those of the Western Adventures of Lolo 2, the stages are completely different. Therefore, they are two separate video games. The Japanese Adventures of Lolo 1 & 2 include original stages, whereas the American Adventures of Lolo 1 & 2 are compilations of stages taken from earlier Japan-only titles. The American Adventures of Lolo 3 includes mostly original stages, instead, usually easier than the stages in the Japanese Adventures of Lolo 2.

Japanese title	Western title	Regions	Release	Platform(s)
Eggerland Mystery	Eggerland Mystery	JP, EU	1985	MSX
Meikyū Shinwa (lit. "Labyrinth Myth"); Eggerland	Eggerland 2	JP, EU	1986	MSX, MSX2, Famicom Disk System
Eggerland: Revival of the Labyrinth	-	JP	1988	Famicom
Eggerland: Departure to Creation	-	JP	1988	Famicom Disk System
-	Adventures of Lolo (USA)	NA, EU	1989	NES
Adventures of Lolo (Japan)	-	JP	1990	Famicom
-	Adventures of Lolo 2 (USA)	NA, EU	1990	NES
Adventures of Lolo 2 (Japan)	-	JP	1990	Famicom
-	Adventures of Lolo 3 (USA)	NA, EU	1991	NES
Lolo no Daibōken (lit. "Lolo's Great Adventure")	Adventures of Lolo (Game Boy)	JP, EU	1994	Game Boy
Eggerland Episode 0: Quest of Lala	-	JP	1996	Windows
Eggerland for Windows 95 / Revival! Eggerland	-	JP	1996 / 2000	Windows

== Gameplay overview ==
=== Basics ===
The player must guide Lolo through a room of 11×11 tiles and have Lolo collect all of the Heart Framers (sometimes referred to as Hearts) in the room. Doing so opens up a Jewel Box, which contains an item (sometimes a key or jewel). Successfully acquiring the contents of the Jewel Box will clear the room of all monsters and open the way to the next room(s). Players need to navigate Lolo past the many monsters seen throughout the rooms — some are harmless while others are deadly.

Lolo's only weapon is a Magic Shot. Two shots (and always two shots) are obtained by collecting certain Heart Framers (sometimes referred to as Shot Framers). Heart Framers containing magic shots are not differentiated in appearance from regular Heart Framers. Collecting a Heart Framer that does contain magic shots, however, is normally indicated by a different sound effect than a regular Heart Framer's. Magic shots allow Lolo to temporarily turn enemies into Eggs, which can be pushed around, but not pulled. Monsters in eggs will hatch after a few seconds. If Lolo shoots an egg a second time, it will fly off the screen, though the monster will reappear at its original starting point a few seconds later. Reappearance is typically indicated by an outlined box of sorts and then the monster physically appearing very shortly afterward. Lolo may move through the outlined box unhindered.

If a monster's starting point is covered with an Emerald Framer or another monster and there are no warp holes in the level, the monster will not return to the level. Lolo himself cannot cover a monster's starting point to cause this to happen. If Lolo is on a monster's starting point and it reappears, Lolo will be "on top" of the monster and can usually walk off of it, though some monsters like Almas or Skulls will kill Lolo if he is standing on their starting points.

=== Terrain and obstacles ===
There are various types of terrain and obstacles in the levels. Emerald Framers, or Emeralds, are green blocks that Lolo may push around freely, but he cannot pull them. Lolo cannot push multiple, stacked Emeralds at one time. This is similar to the game Sokoban. Emeralds are typically used to block dangerous monsters or ranged attacks from other monsters. One type of terrain is the grass (sometimes called flower bed), which Lolo may walk freely on, yet any mobile monster cannot enter the grass on its own. If Lolo pushes a monster in an egg onto the grass, the monster will try to walk off after the egg hatches. Another type of terrain is the sand. Lolo will only move at half speed while on the sand, but any mobile monster is unaffected by the sand's slowing effects. If Lolo is only halfway on the sand, he will not be affected.

Some other obstacles include trees and rocks. Both of these block movement from Lolo and monsters. Monsters that have a ranged attack, like Medusas or Gols, can shoot through the trees, but Lolo cannot. Rocks prevent shots from both Lolo and monsters. Another obstacle is the one-way arrows. Lolo can enter these arrows from any direction except the direction the arrow is pointing. For instance, if the arrow is pointing up, Lolo cannot walk down against the arrow. One-way arrows do not stop monsters in any way, nor do they prevent any shots from Lolo or monsters.

Some levels contain water or lava. Neither prevent shots from Lolo nor monsters from going through and both prohibit movement from Lolo and monsters. There are sometimes bridges going over the water and lava and both Lolo and mobile monsters can cross the bridges freely. With water, Lolo can push a monster in an egg onto the water to act as a temporary bridge. Typically, levels are laid out so Lolo can go to the other side of the waterway. An egg sinks quickly after being pushed into the water. If Lolo is on an egg and it sinks, Lolo will be killed. Some waterways even have currents which Lolo can ride eggs on to other parts of the level. Eggs will sink upon reaching the end of the current. An egg that sinks in the water will remove the monster from the level temporarily, but the monster will reappear in its original starting point (just like hitting it as an egg with a second magic shot). There can only be one egg on any water part of the level at any time. A second egg may not be put into the water until the first one sinks. Eggs may not be pushed into the lava.

The crumbling bridge is an obstacle that was only featured in Adventures of Lolo 3. These bridges can only be crossed twice. The first time will make the bridge crack. The second time, the bridge will crumble away, leaving either water or lava behind. Lolo must be fully on the bridge to qualify it for being crossed. If Lolo only walks halfway on these bridges and walks off, they will not be damaged. Any monster walking over these bridges will not cause any damage to them.

=== Warp holes ===
In level 10-5 of Lolo 2, a warp hole is shown here being used. Lolo simply shoots the Snakey and pushes the egg to block the Don Medusa to get the upper heart, then shoots the egg a second time and covers Snakey's spot with an Emerald. It is shown reappearing at the hole below the Medusa for safe passage.

One final trick that appears in most games are the warp holes. Some levels, but not all, have pre-defined locations for a monster to alternately appear if it is removed from the screen and its original starting point is covered. Its starting point may be covered with an Emerald or another monster. Also, an object need only cover a part of the original point. For instance, if an Emerald were only on 1/4 of the monster's original starting point, this would be sufficient to cover it. Lolo himself cannot cover a monster's starting point and cause it to be sent to a hole. For a demonstration of how a warp hole works, see the adjacent image showing a 3-step process.

The holes go in a numbered order and the monsters go to the lowest numbered hole available. If there were two holes, for instance, and both the monster's starting point and the first hole were covered, the monster would go to the second hole. Many games had a maximum limit of 8 holes per level, though rarely ever used this many.

One important thing to remember is that the monster's original spot needs to stay covered to send it to a hole. If Lolo removes a monster that was sent to a hole and its original starting point was uncovered, it would not continue going to the hole, but rather back to its original starting point. Though in some rooms, monsters may need to be sent back to their original starting point in order to solve the room.

If a monster is in the process of reappearing and Lolo covers its spot while this is happening (i.e. when the outlined box indicating a monster is about to reappear is there and gets covered), the reappearing process will fail and the monster will be permanently removed from the level. It will not be sent to a hole.

=== Powers ===
In some levels, Lolo can obtain certain powers to help him. These powers include the Hammer, the Bridge, and the Arrow Turn (sometimes called a One-Way Pass). To obtain a power, Lolo must collect a certain amount of hearts, which is pre-defined in the data for any level that gives a power. This value varies from level to level. The maximum amount of powers a level can have is three. If the next heart to be collected will give Lolo a power, all hearts in the room will flash as an indicator:

- A hammer allows Lolo to break one rock.
- A bridge may be used on an area of water or lava, though if used on lava it will burn down a few seconds after use. A bridge that was naturally built over lava at the beginning of the level will not burn down.
- The arrow turn allows Lolo to rotate a one-way arrow clockwise.

To use any of these powers, Lolo simply needs to face the respective obstacle the power is used for and use the magic shot button. For arrows, Lolo may be facing the arrow from any direction, though care must be taken to ensure that Lolo is standing in the proper position, or a shot will be fired by accident instead.

== Characters ==
=== Protagonists ===
Lolo
The hero of the story and the playable character in nearly all games. He and Lala are destined for each other. Lolo is a master musician. He becomes King Lolo after he marries Lala at the end of Eggerland 2 (MSX)/ Eggerland FDS.
Lala
Lala is a princess who is captured by King Egger. She is an inspired dancer. She later marries Lolo at the end of Eggerland 2 (MSX)/ Eggerland FDS, and becomes Queen Lala.

=== Side characters ===
Prince Lulu
Son of Lolo and Lala after they got married and became King and Queen. Lulu was introduced in the 1994 Game Boy game Adventures of Lolo. In the game, he is a small child who is an especially vulnerable target for enemies.
Grandpa
Grandpa is an elderly, yellow, ball-like creature who lives in the training trees in Adventures of Lolo 3.

=== Enemies ===
King Egger
King Egger is the leader of the Great Devil's Evil Empire, and the antagonist of all games in the Eggerland series.
Snakey
Snakeys are green caterpillar-like creatures scattered across most of the Eggerland games. They do not pose any harm to Lolo except for impeding the way.
Goll
Golls are pink dragon-like creatures that are only active after all collectibles in their levels are collected. Once they awaken they shoot fireballs when Lolo gets to their row or column. These firefalls instantly burn Lolo on contact, but can be deflected by other enemies, rocks or blocks.
Skull
Skulls are exactly what they are, undead skulls controlled by some necromancy. They activate after all collectibles in their levels are collected. Once they awaken, they chase after Lolo. One touch from a Skull can kill Lolo.
Alma
Almas, also known as Armmas or Armarks, are armadillo-like creatures present in various levels of each Eggerland game. They are red in Eggerland Mystery (1985) and Revival! Eggerland (2000), and grey in Adventures of Lolo (1990) for the NES. If an Alma's axis intersects with Lolo's, the Alma tucks into a ball and rolls towards Lolo to attack. One touch from an Alma is enough to kill Lolo. If Lolo dodges the Alma, it continues to roll until it hits an obstacle, and then resumes its pursuit of Lolo.
Rocky
Rockys are stone-like creatures that are present in various levels of each Eggerland game. They are Grey in each of their games. If a Rocky touches Lolo, it stops him in its tracks, forcing Lolo to move away from it in order to get it to move again.
Leeper
Leepers are green enemies that hop around the stage, roaming freely within a given area. When they make contact with Lolo, they will instantly fall asleep and act in a manner similar to a rock, blocking enemies and Lolo alike while being unable to be put into an egg while sleeping.
Medusa
Medusas are statues with human heads and snake hair that appear in various levels of each Eggerland game. These creatures can turn Lolo into stone if he gets too close, killing him instantly, unless there is an enemy, rock, or block to impede its line of sight.
Don Medusa
Don Medusas are pink and grey demon creatures that appear in various levels of each Eggerland game. These creatures move left and right, or up and down, can turn Lolo into stone if he gets too close, killing him instantly, unless there is an enemy, rock, or block to impede its line of sight.

== Games ==
=== Eggerland Mystery ===
Eggerland Mystery (エッガーランド ミステリー, Eggerland Misuteri) is a 1985 puzzle game for MSX computer systems produced by HAL Laboratory. It is the first game in the Eggerland series. Its main characters are named Lolo and Lala.

=== Eggerland 2 ===
Eggerland 2, known in Japan as Meikyū Shinwa (迷宮神話; "Labyrinth Myth"), is a 1986 puzzle game for the MSX (and shows extra colors on MSX2) produced by HAL Laboratory. It is the sequel to the original Eggerland Mystery and the second game in the Eggerland series. The game is often referred to as "Shodai" (初代), or the "first Eggerland". The game features a total of 122 stages; the game is therefore presented in a 10-by-10 grid, plus 22 extra stages.

Eggerland (エッガーランド) is a port of Meikyū Shinwa for the MSX computer platform with updated graphics and different music. The game was released in Japan in 1987 for the Famicom Disk System by HAL Laboratory.

=== Eggerland: Meikyū no Fukkatsu ===
Eggerland: Meikyū no Fukkatsu (エッガーランド 迷宮の復活, Eggerland: Revival of the Labyrinth) is a puzzle video game developed by HAL Laboratory for the Family Computer. It was released in 1988 in Japan as the fourth game in the Eggerland series following Eggerland Mystery, and is the third in the series not counting the port of Eggerland 2 made for the Famicom Disk System. The game contains roughly 162 stages (or maps), which are arranged on an 8-by-16 grid (with some stages hidden). This entry in the series would serve as the basis for Eggerland – Departure to Creation, which reuses Revival of the Labyrinth's core gameplay and presentation.

This game is more linear than its predecessor: Lolo (the player) can choose to go in two different directions only in a dozen of rooms. Similar to the key that is used to access new rooms of the dungeon, the raft makes its second appearance in the series as a room-completion prize which allows Lolo entry to the water courses in the southwest region of the game. Revival of the Labyrinth also has special inventory items that Lolo can collect along the way, such as a map and a "Magic Bell". Differences from Eggerland 2/FDS include the absence of time-based levels with special keys and Guardians/Gods as their prizes. Instead, these are given out for defeating rooms that lead to only one other room in the dungeon. Rather than the small key used to enter new rooms, the player may occasionally receive one of the game's special keys, which are used to open special doorways normal keys cannot open, and four of these special keys are used to access rooms closed off from the main dungeon map to obtain pieces of a large King Egger tablet required for access to the final levels of the game. Two other items that can also be obtained from chests are the map, which retains its usage from Eggerland 2, and a new item: the Magic Bell, which rings in four specific rooms of the castle that contain entrances to special dungeons that if completed, award the player with one of the four Gods needed to finish the final rooms of the game, in a similar fashion to the Guardians from Eggerland 2. These entrances to the God dungeons are not revealed like they were in the previous game, where the player had to move one specific Emerald Frame after the room's completion. Here the player has to align the Emerald Framers in a particular pattern to reveal the entrance. Alongside the Gods, Lolo can also encounter Buddhas that give out information in certain empty rooms.

=== Eggerland: Sōzō e no Tabidachi ===
Eggerland: Sōzō e no Tabidachi (エッガーランド 創造への旅立ち, Eggerland: Departure to Creation) is a Japanese puzzle video game in the Eggerland series by HAL Laboratory. It was published for the Family Computer Disk System in 1988. The game comprises 50 stages ("maps"), and progresses linearly (unlike previous titles, such as Meikyū Shinwa and Eggerland – Revival of the Labyrinth). "Construction Mode" enables the player to create a custom map. The game is shorter than earlier Eggerland titles, and many of the maps are reproduced from Eggerland Mystery.
