= Eschalon: Book I =

2007 video game

- Developer: Basilisk Games
- Publisher: Basilisk Games
- Series: Eschalon
- Engine: BlitzMax
- Platforms: Microsoft Windows; Mac OS X; Linux; Cloud (OnLive)
- Release: November 19, 2007 (Windows); December 11, 2007 (Mac OS X); December 21, 2007 (Linux)
- Genre: Role-playing video game
- Mode: Single player

Eschalon: Book I is an isometric turn-based role-playing video game by Basilisk Games. In the style of classic role-playing video games, it features a large and openly explorable game world, comprehensive management of character stats and skills, and a non-linear storyline. It is the first in a trilogy of games set in the fantasy world of Eschalon.

The game was released for Windows on November 19, 2007. Customers could buy the game as a digital download or on a compact disc. The Macintosh version was only released as a digital download on December 11, 2007. The Linux version was also only released as a digital download on December 21. On January 14, 2008, Thomas Riegsecker, the owner of Basilisk Games made an announcement that CD versions sold would contain all three versions of Eschalon: Book I.

A sequel, Eschalon: Book II, was released on May 12, 2010, for Windows, with the Linux and Mac OS X versions following on May 26. Another sequel, Eschalon: Book III, was released February 14, 2014.

== Gameplay ==
Eschalon: Book I is played from an isometric perspective with turn-based combat. The player controls a character that is created at the beginning of the game. The story revolves around the player character who suffers from amnesia. They discover a land that has been affected by war and begins a quest to find out who they are. At the character creation screen, the computer randomly rolls for eight attributes: Strength, Dexterity, Endurance, Speed, Intelligence, Wisdom, Perception and Concentration. The player is given some points to distribute between the attributes, and can make the computer roll the numbers again. There are five classes, 24 individual skills, and five different origins and beliefs allowing for a wide range of different characters.

Throughout the game the player encounters numerous NPCs that offer services, information, and quests.

== Plot ==
The game begins with the player waking up in the abandoned village of Elderhollow, with no memory of who they are. They discovers a note that claims to know who they are, and compels them to head northeast to the village of Aridell and meet a man named Maddock to claim a small package he has been safeguarding. With nothing else to go on, the player arrives in Aridell and receives the package from Maddock. Inside is a small bag full of coins and another sealed note. This new note elaborates on the player's situation: his memory was erased with a special serum and they were placed into hiding for his protection. The note hints that if the player wants to know his real identity they must retrieve his amulet from Eversleep Cemetery to the north. After retrieving the amulet from the coffin of the recently deceased aristocrat Adler Keldam, the writer asks the player to find a woman called Lilith who lives in Tangletree Forest, in the "Heart of the Woods" and show her the amulet.

Talking to the locals in Aridell reveals that the player is in Eastern Thaermore, a country that is currently at war with the Orakur, a race of underground dwellers. The war is being waged due to the theft of a prized jewel known as the "Crux of Ages", stolen from Bastion Spire, the capital of Thaermore. The Chancellor has ordered all soldiers underground to find the Orakur, leaving settlements to fend for themselves. With the Commonwealth Guards away, Goblins took advantage of the situation and destroyed the village of Elderhollow. They have also captured Grimmhold, a fortress which used to provide a safe path through Tangletree Forest to the other side.

The dialogue screen.

When the player finds Lilith, she is willing to explain the purpose of the amulet: it is a key to "The Underground Repository", a secret vault where important people keep their valuables. Lilith points the player towards Blackwater, where the vault is located, and shows them her amulet to prove she is not lying. Arriving in Blackwater, the player discovers a secret passageway leading to the vault. The player opens the security box to find another sealed note along with the "Crux of Ages". The writer is revealed to be the player: they found the prized jewel while scavenging a goblin battleground along with his brother. A powerful Goblin Shaman by the name of "Gramuk" is using a technique called "Temporal Linking" to find the people who found the prized jewel. This was why the player's memory was erased: to protect them from Gramuk and his goblin horde. His brother was captured by the Goblins before he could erase his memory, and is being tortured at Vela, a once prosperous port city destroyed by the Goblins. The player believes Gramuk is influencing the Chancellor into making poor war decisions, allowing the Goblins to move deeper into Thaermore.

The player arrives in the goblin infested city of Vela and finds his brother, who begs the player to warn Erubor, a powerful wizard that resides in Shadowmirk (a secluded place of study for wizards), about Gramuk and the Goblin hordes. The player's brother will ask them to kill him to stop the pain. In Shadowmirk the player finds Erubor, who reveals that the Goblins stole the "Crux of Ages" and Gramuk manipulated the Chancellor into believing the Orakur were responsible. Erubor asks the player to venture into the Crakamir barrens and enter the Goblin Citadel, the heart of the enemy to stop Gramuk. The gate to Crakamir is locked, but the player can find alternative routes to the desert. Erubor tells them about four special keys that are required to go deeper into the citadel. The wizard already has one, which he hands to the player. Erubor explains that another key resides in a community of Giants near the Goblin Citadel. They are his allies, and Erubor tells their chieftain, Omar, of the player's coming. Omar proposes to hand over the key if the player recovers their former chieftain's skull from Thorndike, an abandoned hunting ground northeast of Blackwater. The other two keys are in the possession of Goblin Warlords: one in Vela and one in Grimmhold. Before the player leaves, Erubor tells them about a portal in the Citadel that was used to steal the "Crux of Ages", and that the player can use it to return the prized jewel to Bastion Spire.

Combat is played out in turns.

If the player aids Omar, several Giants help them assault the entrance of the Goblin Citadel. Using the four Goblin Keys, the player is allowed to venture deeper into the Citadel. When the player enters Gramuk's lair, the Goblin Shaman will make them an offer: if they hand over the "Crux of Ages" and leave Thaermore, Gramuk will give the player enough gold to last them a lifetime. If the player accepts, Gramuk keeps his word and Thaermore falls to the Goblin hordes. If the player refuses, Gramuk attacks. Mortally wounding Gramuk causes him to transform into a Dirachnid (a massive spider) and the battle continues. Gramuk falls before the player, giving access to the secret portal to Bastion Spire. Entering the portal, the player can either return the "Crux of Ages" and allow Thaermore to recover, or murder the Chancellor while he is vulnerable. If the player returns the prized jewel, the Chancellor will wake up from his nightmare and he and the player share a short conversation before the ending cinematic.

== Versions ==
Eschalon: Book I is available as a direct download or as a CD version. The CD version of Eschalon: Book I was originally only available for Windows, and included the following extras:

- High resolution digital map of Thaermore
- Extended music track of the main theme
- Teaser Trailer formatted for Windows Media Player and DivX
- Seven unique screenshots with notes following the progress of Eschalon: Book I

Thomas Reigsecker announced on January 14, 2008, that future CD versions would include all three platforms (Windows, Macintosh and Linux). There are two differences between the new CD version and the original: a "slightly altered DVD jacket, and the disc itself has a green gradient instead of the tan gradient of the Windows-only disc". The extras remain the same.

== Reception ==
Eschalon: Book I has generally received favorable reviews from gaming critics, scoring 75% at Metacritic from four reviews. Macworld awarded the game 3.5/5, claiming that "Eschalon: Book I is a great attempt at an 'old school' role-playing game that's worth playing, and definitely worth the download time." RPG Codex gave Book I a positive review and praised the music in particular: "It's a perfect soundtrack for the depicted locations, sets the mood properly and, while the number of tracks is quite small, manages not to become boring." A common criticism from gamers that Riegsecker himself admits is the shortness of the game, with most players finishing Book I in under twenty hours. In a September 2009 interview, Riegsecker revealed that sales were 25% higher than originally projected, and that about a year after the game's release they saw a profit. He also broke down the games sales by platform: 48% Windows, 42% Macintosh, and 10% Linux. Linux Format reviewed the game and gave it a score of 7/10.

== Awards ==
- 2007 "Indie RPG of the Year" – Eschalon: Book 1 (RPGWatch)
- 2007 "Indie RPG of the Year" – Eschalon: Book 1 (Gaming with Children)
- 2007 "Independent RPG of the Year" Runner Up – Eschalon: Book 1 (GameBanshee)

== Expansion ==
On November 24, 2007, Riegsecker mentioned the possibility of a free add-on where the player is allowed to travel to Ash Island, an inaccessible area. On February 8, 2008, Riegsecker announced that the add-on had taken a back seat to development of the next installment of the Eschalon series (Eschalon: Book II) due to technical problems. The expansion was planned to add another four to five hours of gameplay and would have been independent from the main storyline.
