= Eternity's Child =

2008 video game

- Developers: Luc Bernard; Silver Sphere Studios
- Publishers: Alten8 (Wii version only); Silver Sphere Studios (PC/Mobile Version)
- Engine: PlaneD
- Platforms: Wii (WiiWare); Steam
- Release: Steam; July 31, 2008; Wii; Cancelled
- Genre: Platform
- Modes: Single-player, multiplayer

Eternity's Child (previously known as Angel's Eternity) is a side-scrolling platform game based on a fairy tale created by Luc Bernard. It was released by Luc Bernard and Silver Sphere Studios on Steam July 31, 2008.

== Gameplay ==
The gameplay involves the player controlling two characters simultaneously. In the cancelled Wii version, one would've been controlled with the analogue stick of the Nunchuk and the other with the pointer function of the Wii Remote.

== Development ==
Eternity's Child was initially developed for Xbox Live Arcade, and was one of the first games to be made with the XNA toolset. On September 9, 2007, it was revealed that it was changed to a retail Nintendo DS game as well as a downloadable WiiWare game.

Because of the move to the Wii, the gameplay style of the XNA version has been changed in favor of one that takes advantage of the Wii Remote. Alten8 were porting the original code, and adapting the game to Nintendo's standards for the Wii version, and hope that previous errors could be resolved. This version was eventually cancelled.

== Reception ==
Eternity's Child was panned by gaming site Destructoid for "flawed design", "horrible animation" and "broken controls". In reviewing the game, which he gave a 1/10, Anthony Burch went so far as to say that it was "the worst game I've played in several years." Bernard responded to the review, calling it "highly unprofessional", and defended the title by stating that Destructoid did not play the patched version. Bernard has drawn further criticism after he decided to remove the Destructoid robot from the game in response to the review.

The game was also panned by Mike Fahey of Kotaku for its "story, or lack thereof", two-character mechanic, poor AI, and somewhat chaotic level design. However, he also noted that its visual style and music are appealing, and that the included level editor was also an extra bonus, and stated that the game "does have a lot to offer for $5". He concluded that the game is "still very much a work in progress".

Eternity's Child's soundtrack was nominated on the GANG Awards for "Best Audio Other".
