= 1980s in video games =

Video game-related events in 1980s

- 1970s
- 1980s in video games
- 1990s
Other topics in 1980s:
- Anthropology
- Comics
- Fashion
- Motorsport
- Music
- Science and technology
- Sociology
- Television

Pac-Man (1980)

The 1980s was the second decade in the industry's history. It was a decade of highs and lows for video games. The decade began amidst a boom in the arcade video game business with the golden age of arcade video games, the Atari 2600's dominance of the home console market during the second generation of video game consoles, and the rising influence of home computers. However, an oversatuation of low quality games led to an implosion of the video game market that nearly destroyed the industry in North America. Most investors believed video games to be a fad that had since passed, up until Nintendo's success with its Nintendo Entertainment System (NES, Famicom) revived interest in game consoles and led to a recovery of the home video game industry. In the remaining years of the decade, Sega ignites a console war with Nintendo, developers that had been affected by the crash experimented with PC games, and Nintendo released the Game Boy, which would become the best-selling handheld gaming device for the next two decades. Other consoles released in the decade included the Intellivision, ColecoVision, TurboGrafx-16 (PC Engine) and Sega Genesis (Mega Drive).

Notable games of the 1980s included Pac-Man, Ms. Pac-Man, Donkey Kong, Super Mario Bros., Adventure, Galaga, Duck Hunt, Tetris, The Legend of Zelda, John Madden Football, Pole Position, Final Fantasy, King's Quest, Microsoft Flight Simulator, Dragon Warrior, Double Dragon, Contra, Mega Man 2, SimCity, Sid Meier's Pirates!, Alex Kidd in Miracle World, After Burner, Prince of Persia, Toss-Up, Gauntlet, Gradius, Out Run, Manic Miner, Defender, Missile Command, Dizzy, 3D Monster Maze, Mother, Frogger, Q*bert, Mappy, Dig Dug, Pitfall!, Elite, and Maniac Mansion.

== Consoles of the 1980s ==
The 1980s opened with popular holdovers like the Atari 2600, alongside newer machines chasing “arcade-at-home” fidelity such as ColecoVision (launched mid-1982 with Donkey Kong as a pack-in) and the self-contained, vector-display Vectrex.

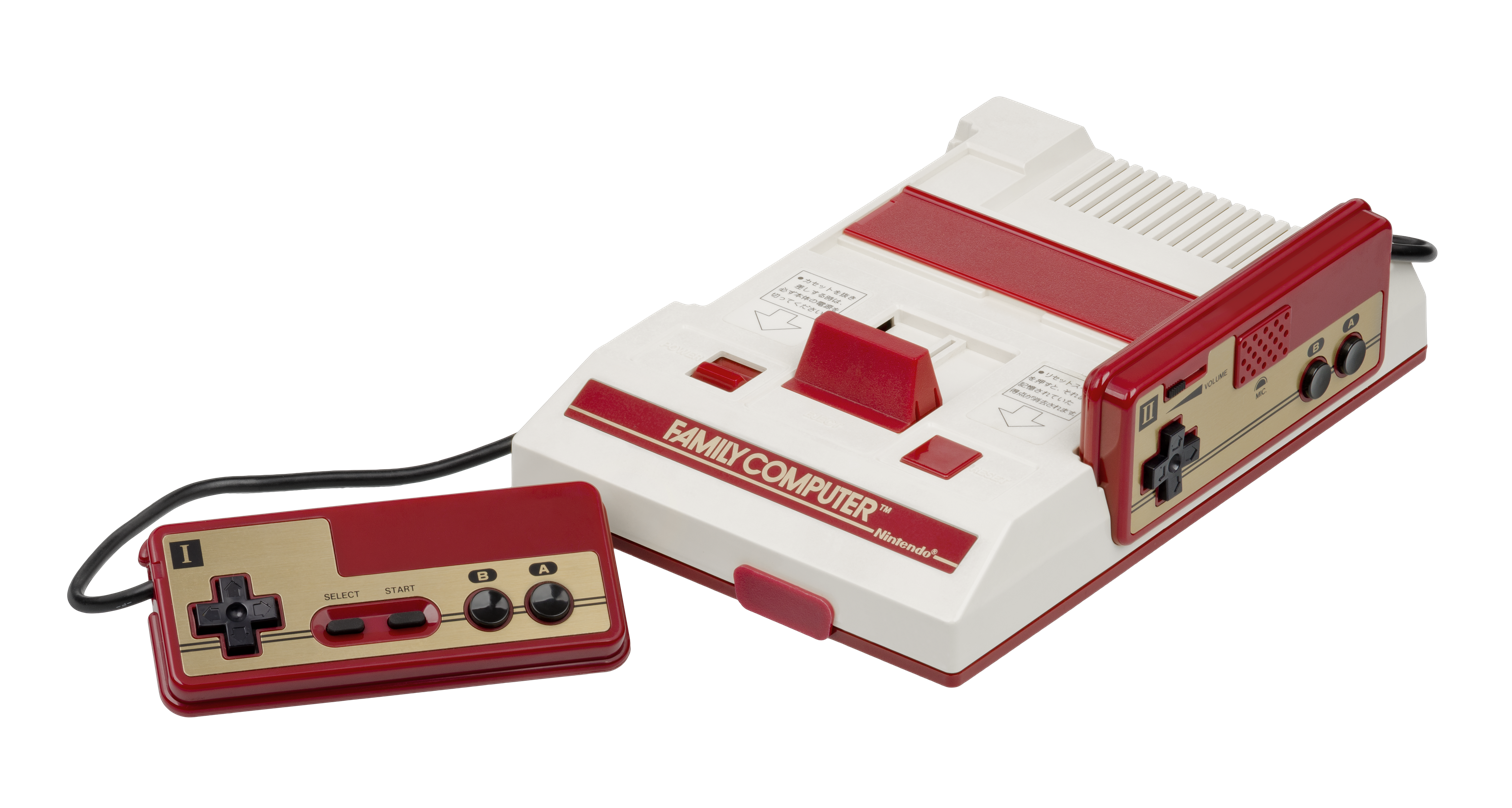

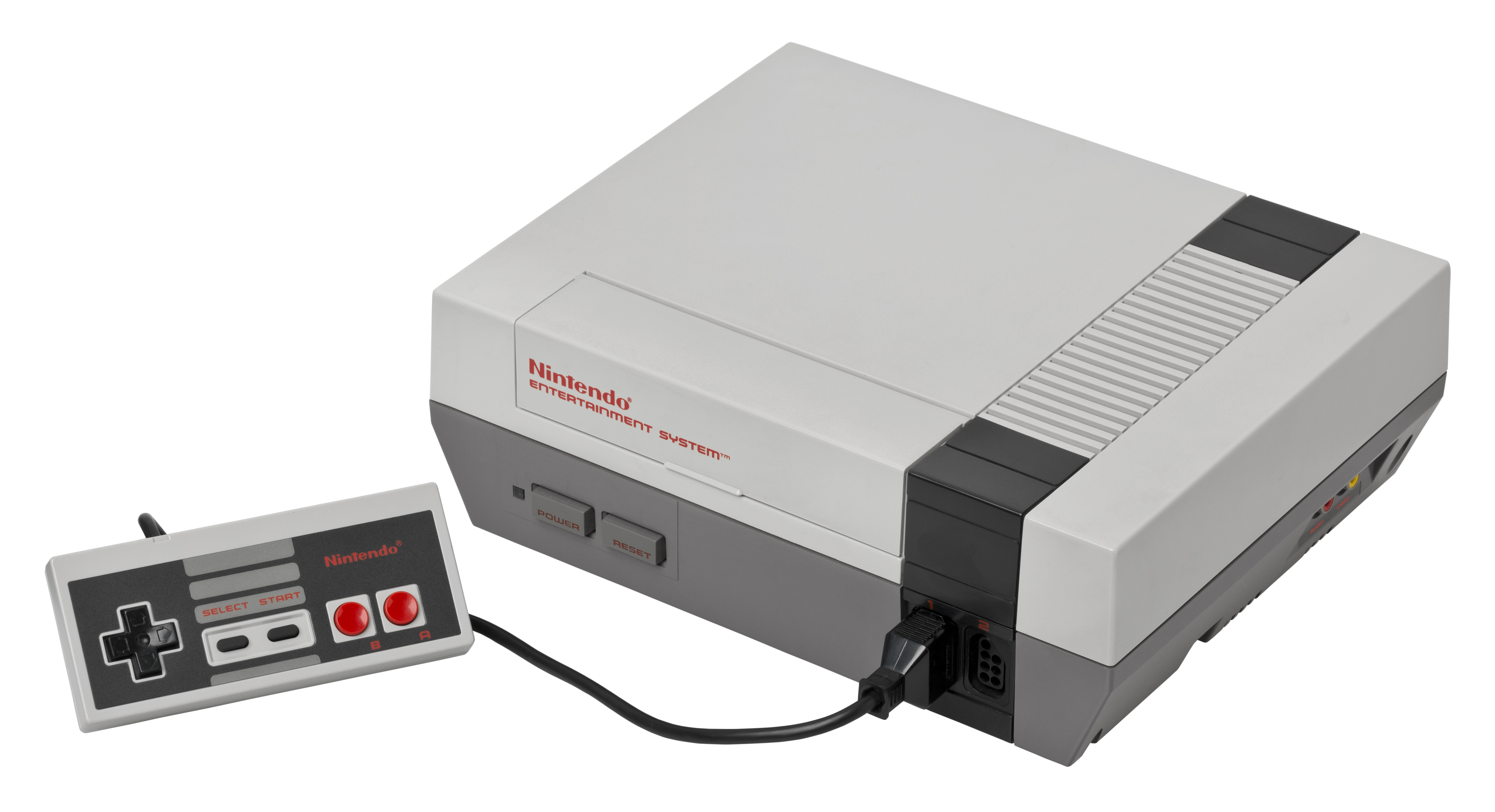

In Japan, Nintendo’s Family Computer (Famicom) arrived in 1983, setting the stage for the company’s U.S. push two years later with the Nintendo Entertainment System. However it wasn't an easy transition to the United States as the market had just crashed the same year as Nintendo launched their own system, the Famicom, in Japan. Thus the American debut began in New York City on Oct. 18, 1985, marketed as a toy (with R.O.B. the Robot and the Zapper Gun) to win back skeptical retailers after the market crash—an approach that helped spark a broader recovery.

Through the second half of the decade, Nintendo consolidated its lead in North America while refining a stricter publishing model: the 10NES lockout chip and licensing rules that shaped third-party game releases and distribution.

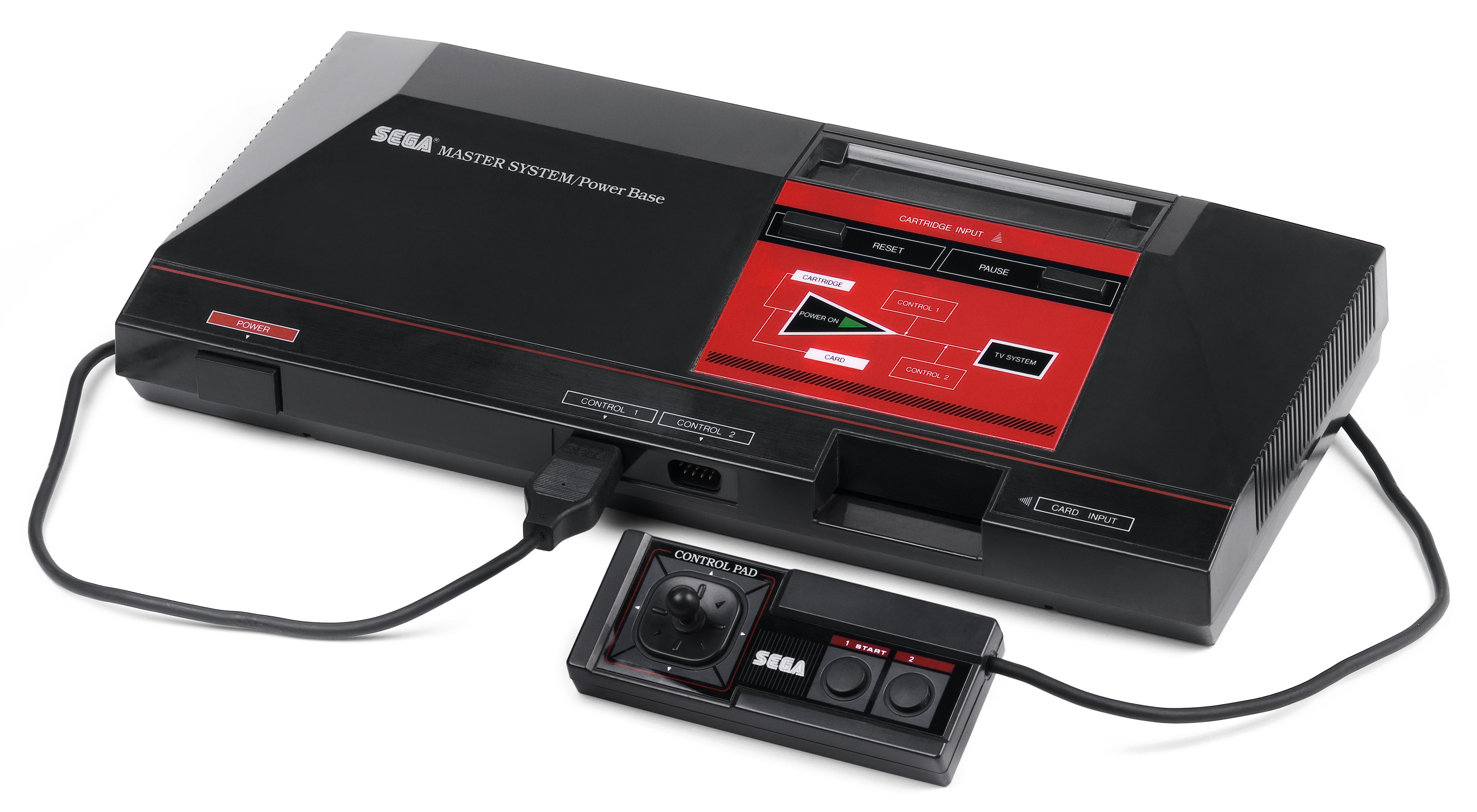

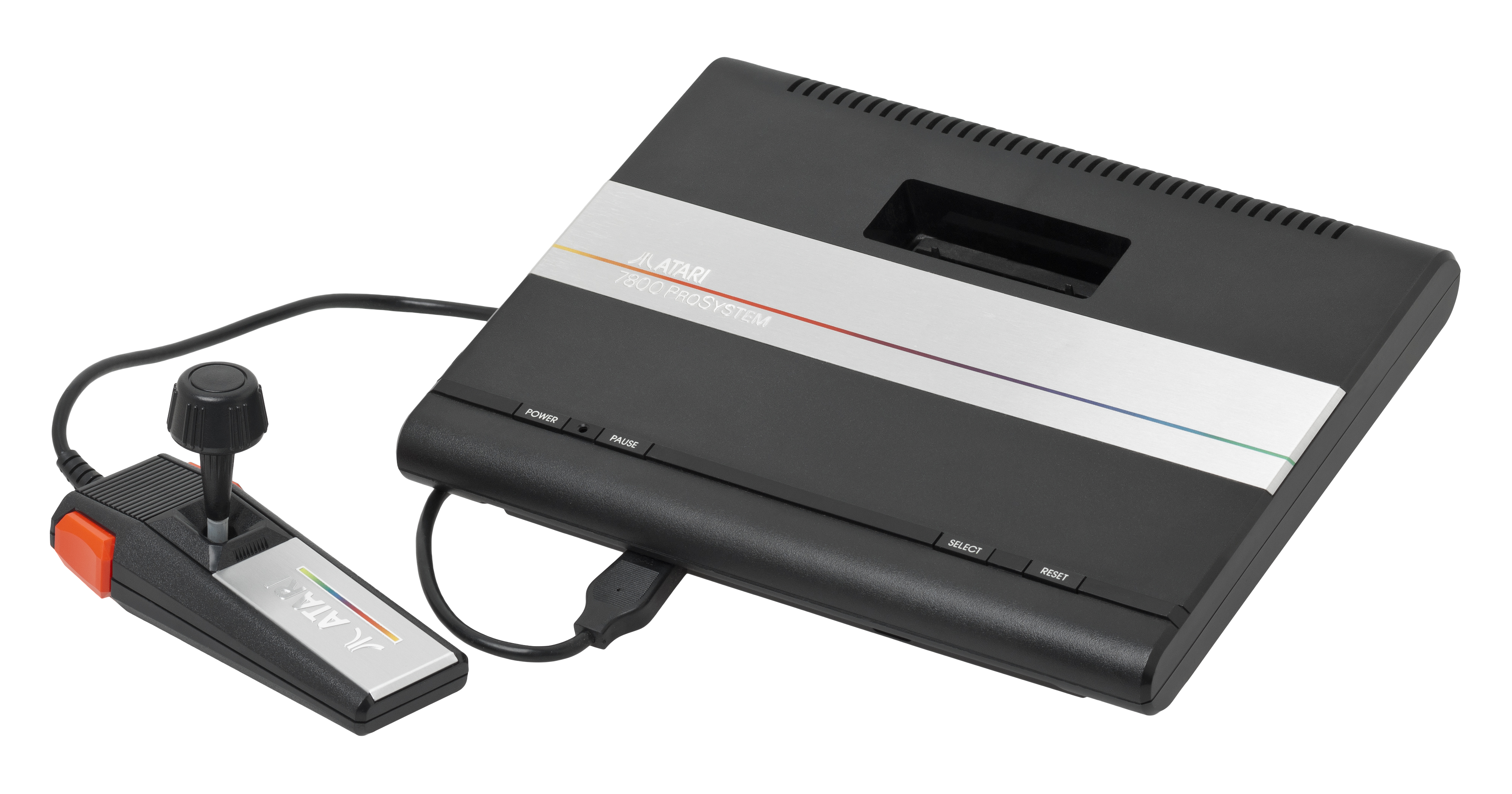

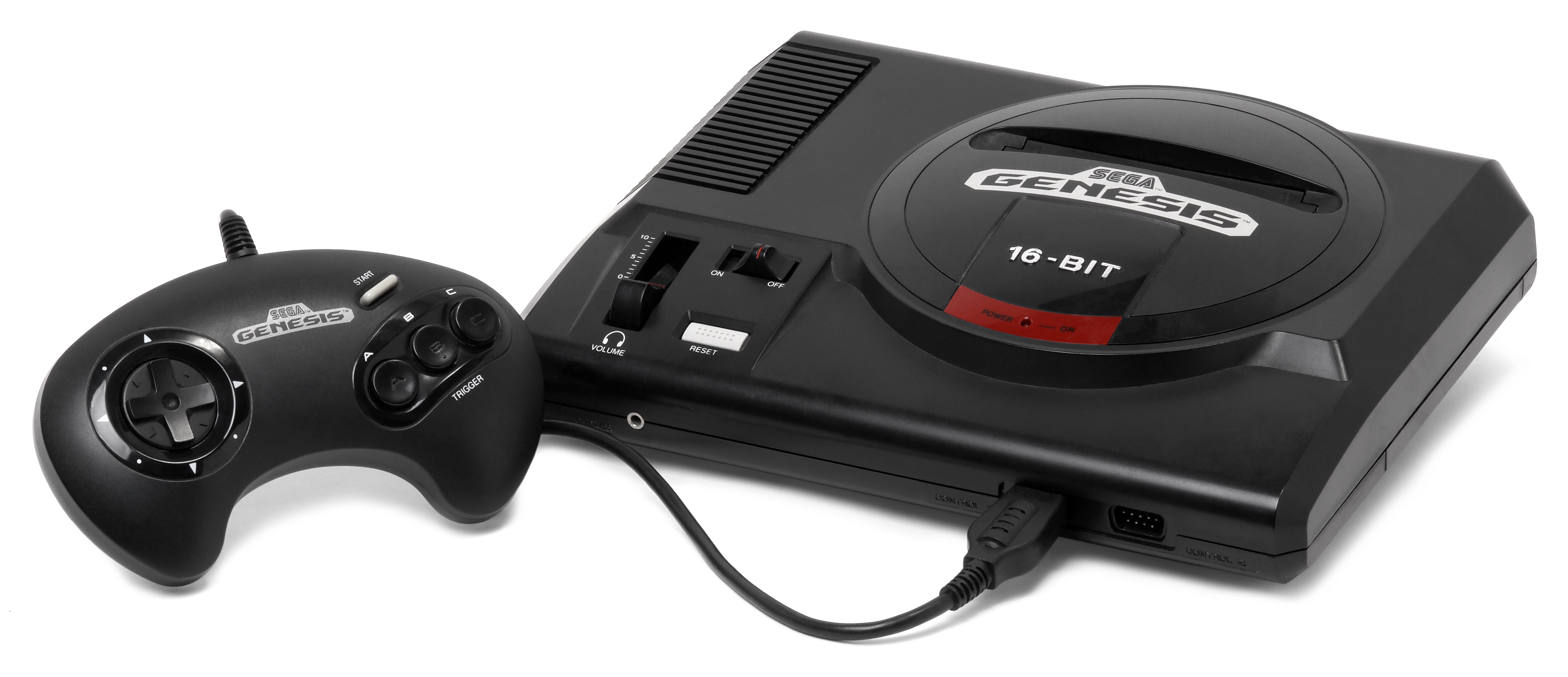

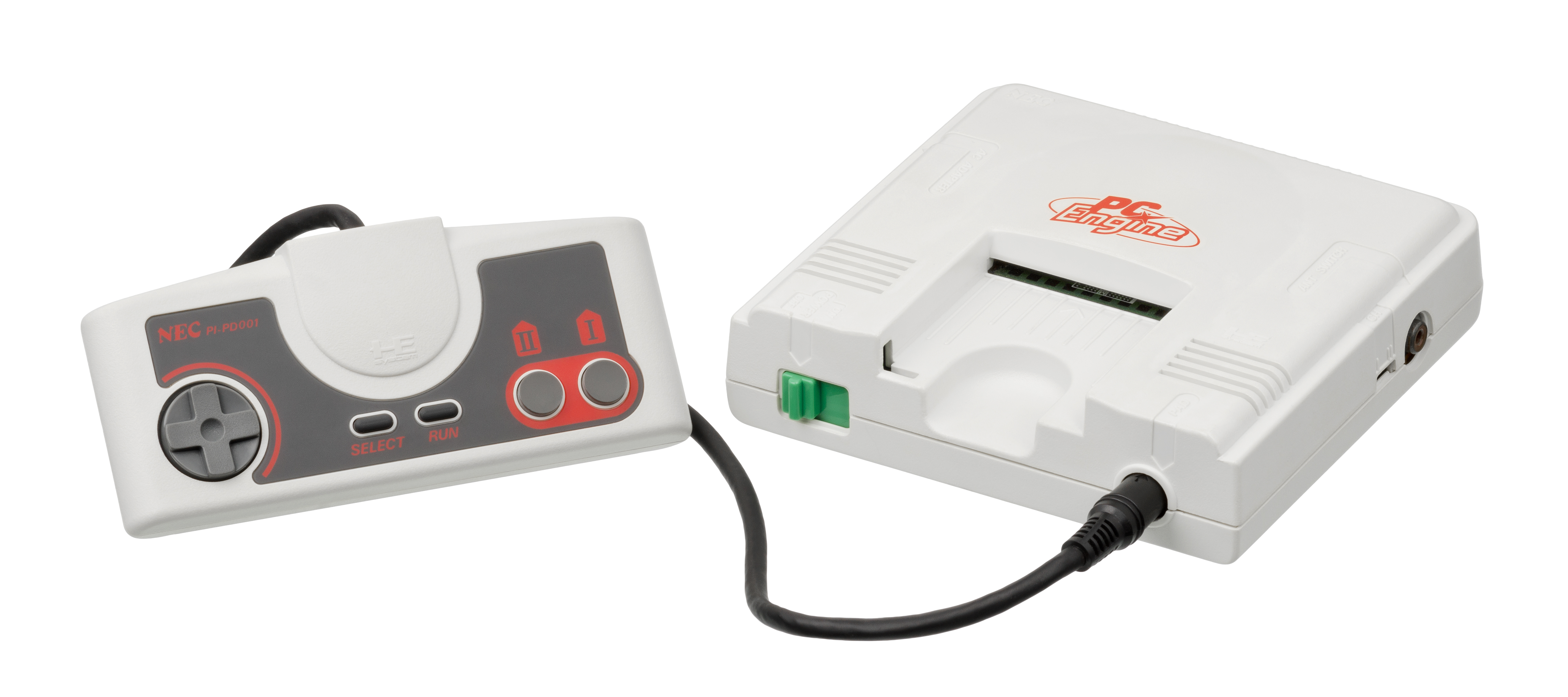

Sega mounted the most persistent challenge with the Master System (sold as Mark III in Japan). While it lagged in the U.S., it had strength in places like Brazil, where local partner TecToy kept variants on store shelves for decades—an unusual long time for an ’80s console.

Atari returned with the 7800, emphasizing affordability and backward compatibility with 2600 cartridges—an early nod to preserving players’ libraries. (Modern reissues even highlight that cross-compatibility today.)

By the late 1980s, the conversation shifted toward higher performance: NEC and Hudson’s PC Engine (1987, Japan) and Sega’s Mega Drive/Genesis (1988 Japan; 1989 U.S.) ushered in faster scrolling, bigger sprites, and more elaborate sound, signaling the next wave of competition that would define the early 1990s.

Behind the scenes, the decade also standardized features that have since become commonplace—battery-backed saves and rewritable media (e.g., Nintendo’s Disk Writer service for the Famicom Disk System)—and elevated hardware engineers like Masayuki Uemura.

== History ==
=== Golden age of arcade games ===
In the early-1980s, arcade games were a vibrant industry. The arcade video game industry in the US alone was generating $5 billion of revenue annually in 1981 and the number of arcades doubled between 1980 and 1982. The effect video games had on society expanded to other mediums as well such as major films and music. In 1982, "Pac-Man Fever" charted on the Billboard Hot 100 charts and Tron became a cult classic.

=== Third-party development and an oversaturated market ===
Following a dispute over recognition and royalties, several of Atari's key programmers split and founded their own company Activision in late 1979. Activision was the first third-party developer for the Atari 2600. Atari sued Activision for copyright infringement and theft of trade secrets in 1980, but the two parties settled on fixed royalty rates and a legitimizing process for third parties to develop games on hardware.

In the aftermath of the lawsuit, an oversaturated market resulted in companies that had never had an interest in video games before beginning to work on their own games and acquire software houses, for instance, Parker Brothers, the board game giant owned at the time by General Mills, developed video games, which spurred the acquisition of U.S. Games by Quaker Oats to compete. The market was also flooded with too many consoles and what were seen as too many poor quality games, elements that would contribute to the collapse of the entire video game industry in 1983.

=== American video game crash of 1983 ===
By 1983, the video game bubble created during the golden age had burst and several major companies that produced computers and consoles had gone into bankruptcy. Atari reported a $536 million loss in 1983. Some entertainment experts and investors lost confidence in the medium and believed it was a passing fad. A game often given poster child status to this era, E.T. the Extra-Terrestrial had such bad sale figures that the remaining unsold cartridges were buried in the deserts of New Mexico.

=== Rise of computer gaming ===
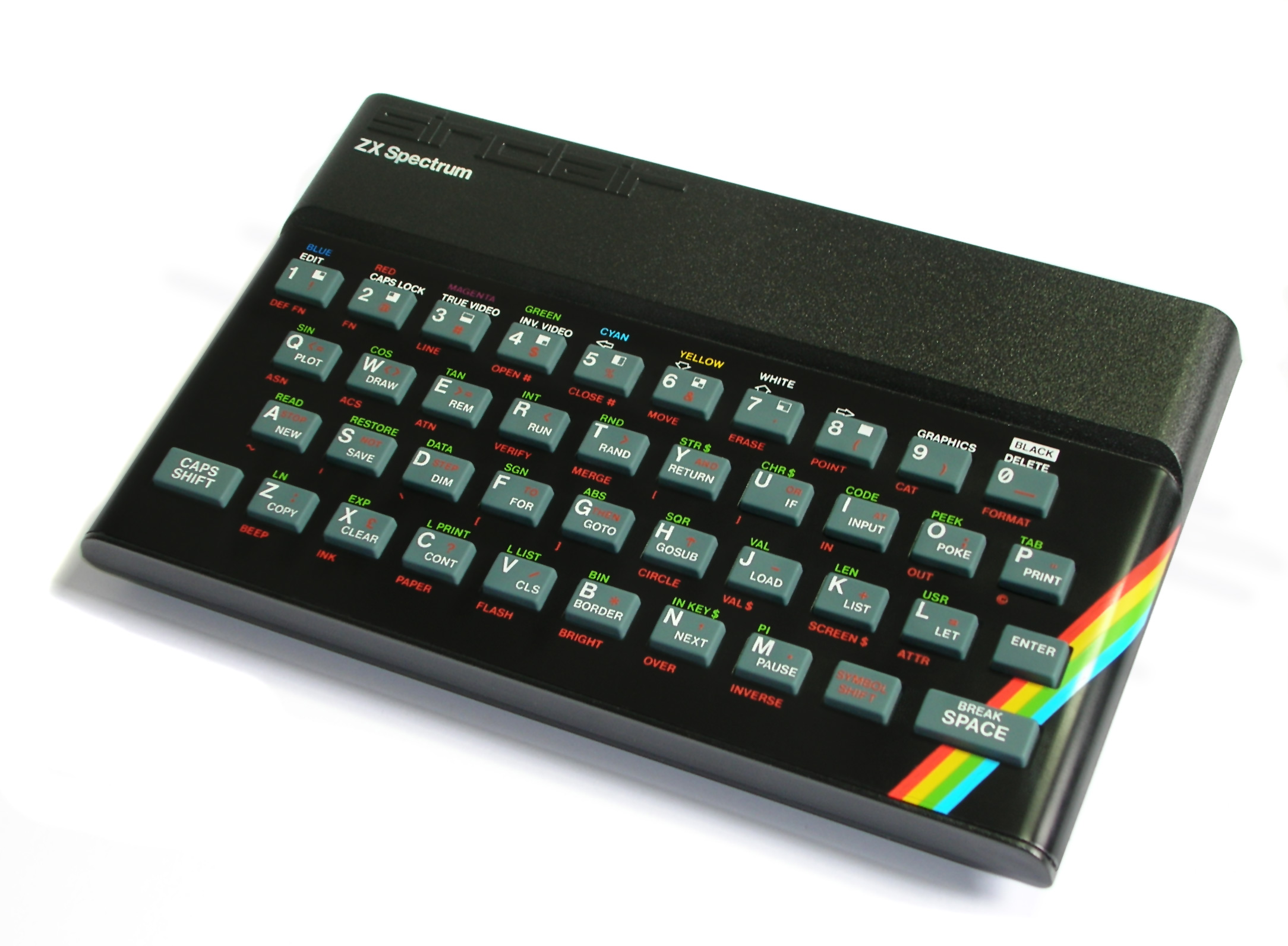

The brunt of the crash was felt mainly across the home console market, localized within the United States. Home computer gaming continued to thrive in this time period, especially with lower-cost machines such as the Commodore 64, ZX Spectrum and IBM Personal Computer. Some computer companies adopted aggressive advertising strategies to compete with gaming consoles and to promote their educational appeal to parents as well. Home computers also allowed motivated users to develop their own games, and many notable titles were created this way, such as Jordan Mechner's Karateka, which he wrote on an Apple II while in college.

In the late 1980s, IBM PC compatibles became popular as gaming devices, with more memory and higher resolutions than consoles, but lacking in the custom hardware that allowed the slower console systems to create smooth visuals.

=== American rejuvenation ===
By 1985, the home market console in North America had been dormant for nearly two years. Elsewhere, video games continued to be a staple of innovation and development. After seeing impressive numbers from its Famicom system in Japan, Nintendo decided to jump into the North American market by releasing the Nintendo Entertainment System, or NES for short. After release it took several years to build up momentum, but despite the pessimism of critics it became a success. Nintendo is credited with reviving the home console market within the United States.

One innovation that led to Nintendo's success was its ability to tell stories on an inexpensive home console; something that was more common for home computer games, but had only been seen on consoles in a limited fashion. Nintendo also took measures to prevent another crash by requiring third-party developers to adhere to regulations and standards, something that has existed on major consoles since then. One requirement was a "lock and key" system to prevent reverse engineering. It also forced third parties to pay in full for their cartridges before release, so that in case of a flop, the liability will be on the developer and not the provider.

== Notable video-game franchises established in the 1980s ==
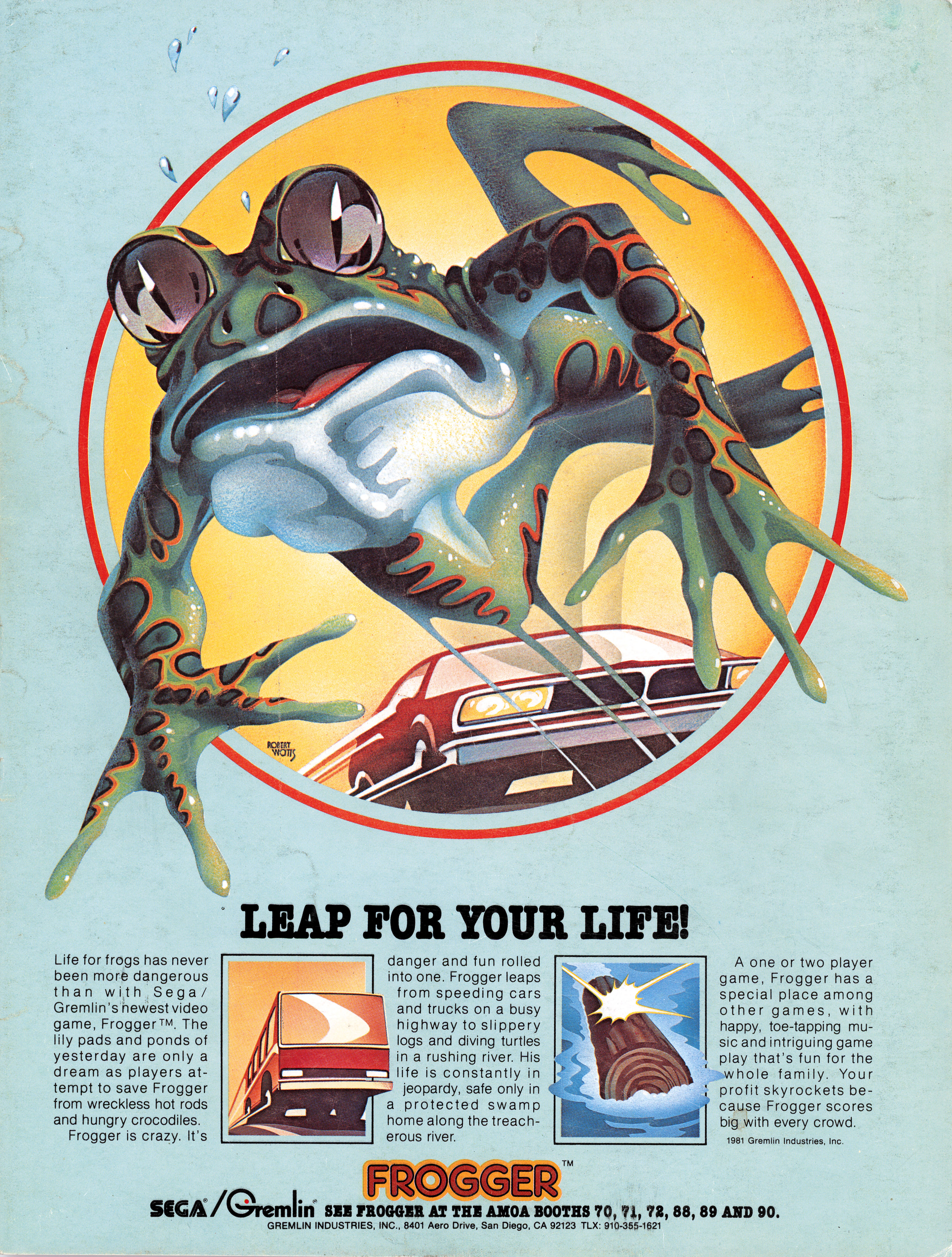
North American flyer for Frogger

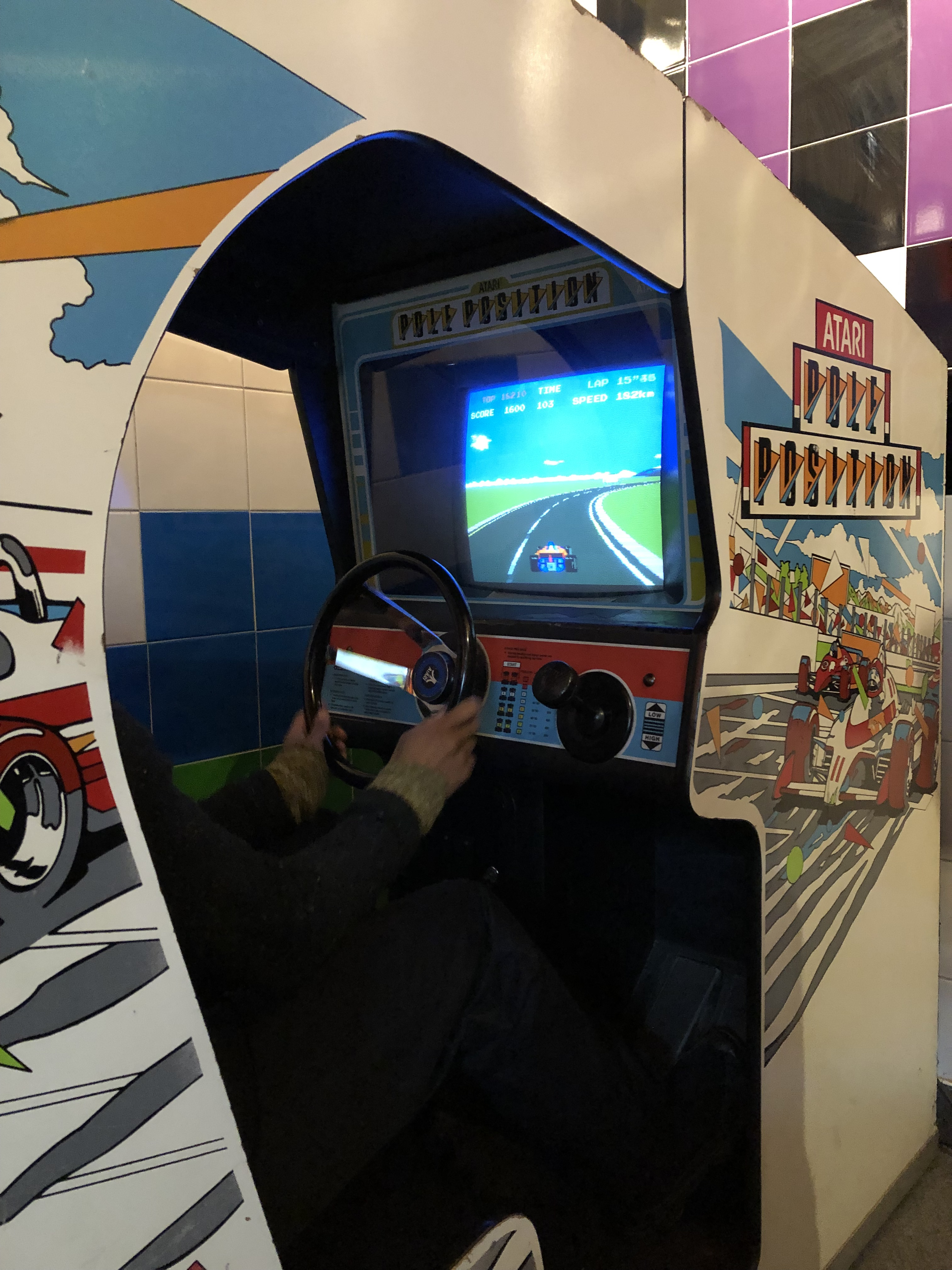
A Pole Position cabinet in Berlin, Germany

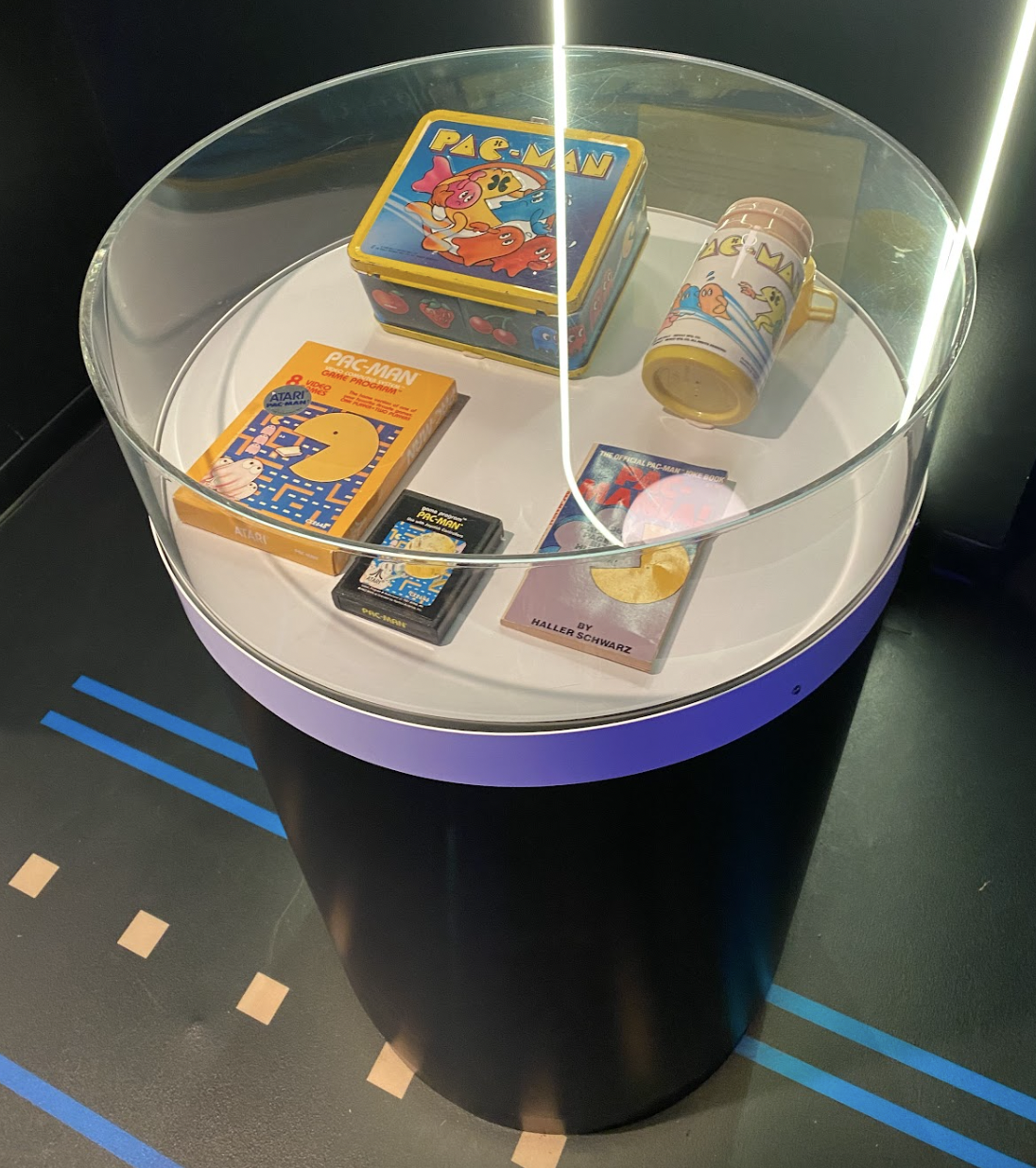
Pac-Man merchandise released in the 1980s, displayed at the Comic-Con Museum in San Diego

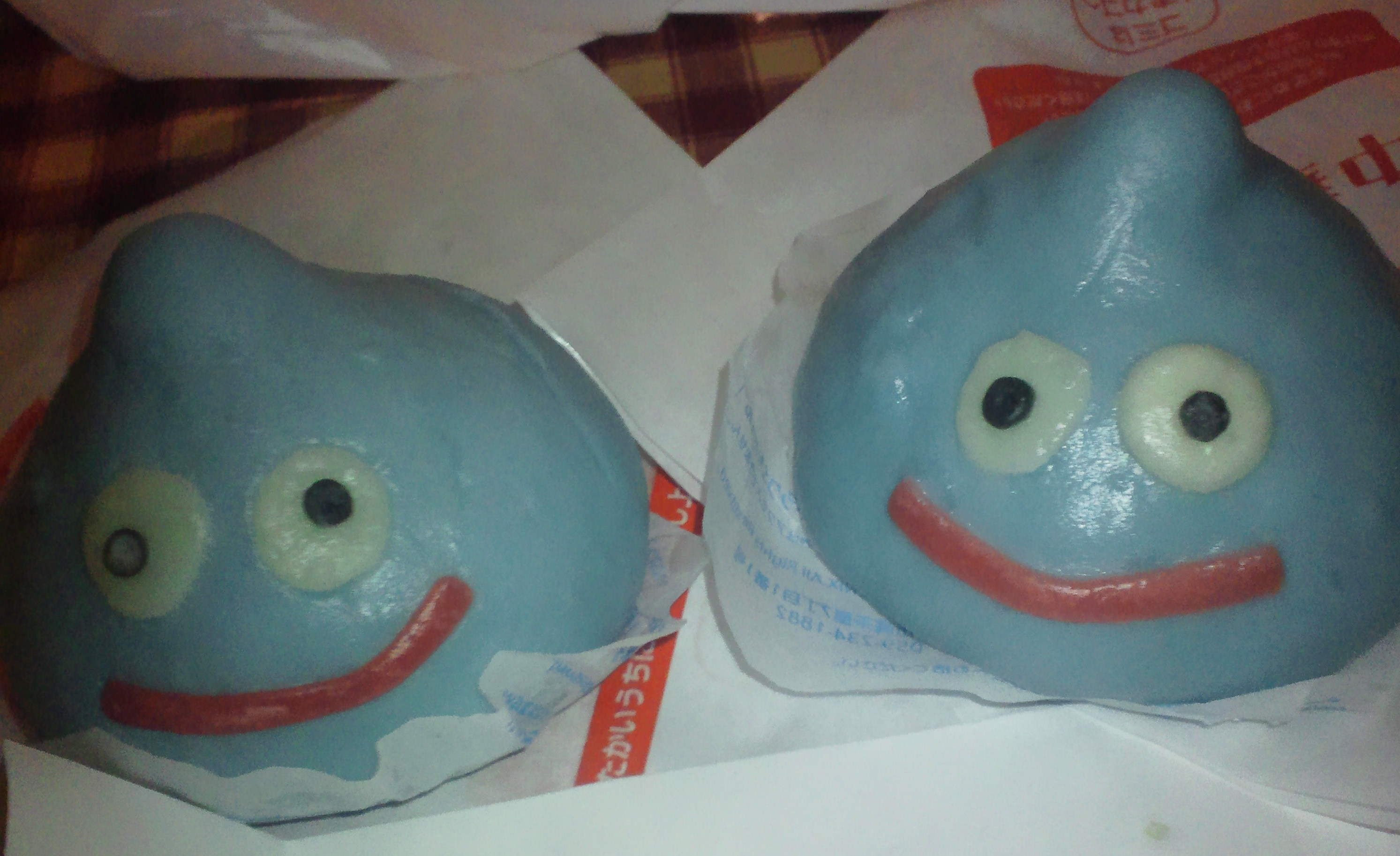
Dragon Warrior, released as Dragon Quest in Japan, introduced the famous Slime character

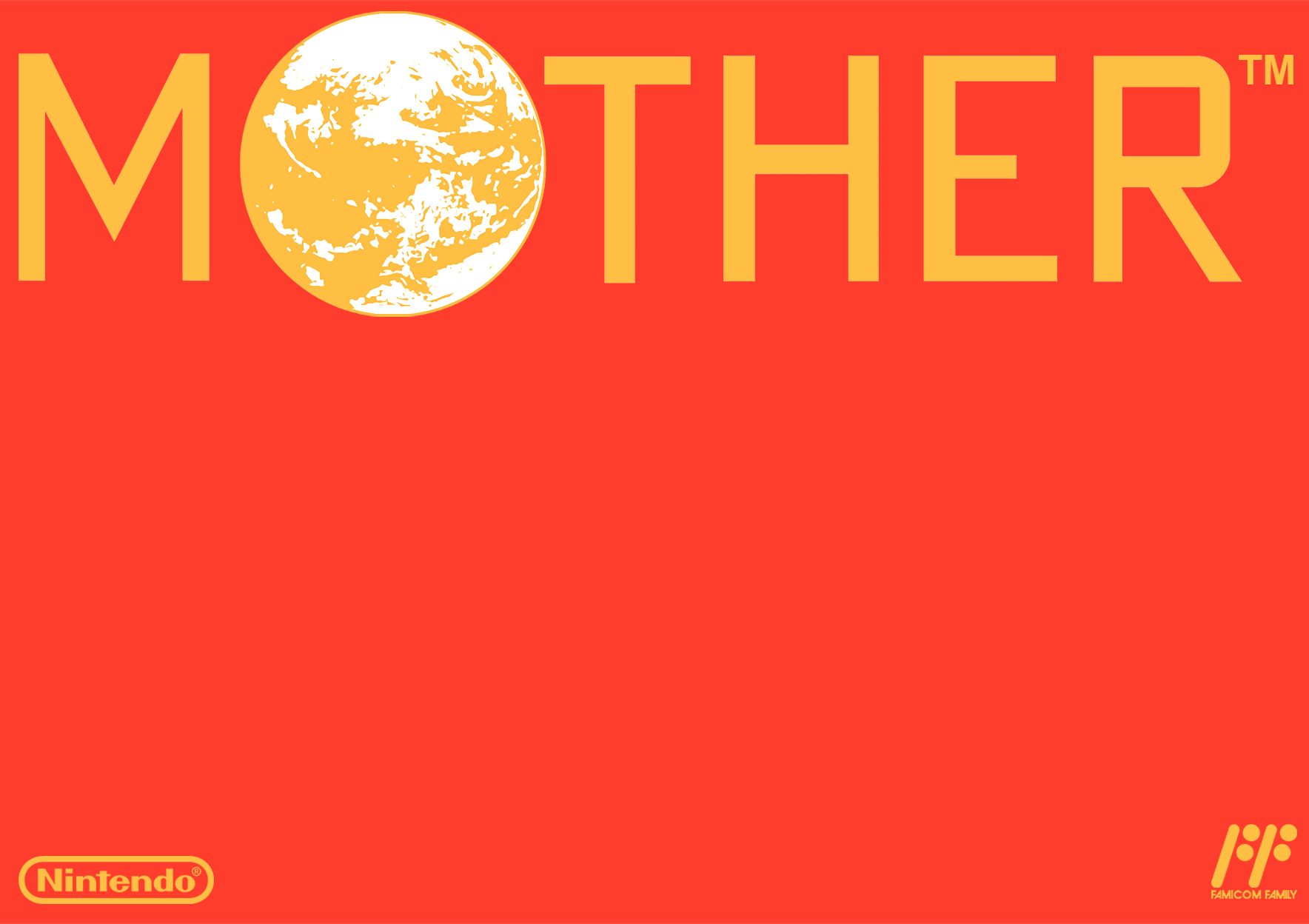
Japanese Famicom box art for Mother

Loading screen of Manic Miner

=== Arcades ===
- 1942 (1984)
- After Burner (1987)
- Altered Beast (1988)
- Arkanoid (1986)
- Balloon Fight (1984)
- Baraduke (1985)
- Battlezone (1980)
- Berzerk (1980)
- Bionic Commando (1987)
- Bomb Jack (1984)
- Bubble Bobble (1986)
- BurgerTime (1982)
- Centipede (1981)
- Contra (1987)
- Darius (1987)
- Defender (1981)
- Dig Dug (1982)
- Donkey Kong (1981)
- Double Dragon (1987)
- Dragon's Lair (1983)
- Fantasy Zone (1986)
- Final Fight (1989)
- Frenzy (1982)
- Frogger (1981)
- Gauntlet (1985)
- Ghosts 'n Goblins (1985)
- Golden Axe (1989)
- Golden Tee Golf (1989)
- Gradius (1985)
- Hang-On (1985)
- Joust (1982)
- Jungle King (1982)
- Kunio-kun (1986)
- Ikari Warriors (1986)
- Mappy (1983)
- Missile Command (1980)
- Mr. Do! (1982)
- Ms. Pac-Man^{2} (1982)
- Ninja Gaiden (1988)
- OutRun (1986)
- Pac-Man (1980)
- Paperboy (1985)
- Pocky & Rocky (1986)
- Pole Position (1982)
- Punch-Out!! (1984)
- Q*bert (1982)
- Qix (1981)
- Rally-X (1980)
- Rampage (1986)
- Red Baron (1981)
- Robotron: 2084 (1982)
- R-Type (1987)
- Rush'n Attack (1985)
- Shinobi (1987)
- Space Harrier (1985)
- Spy Hunter (1983)
- Street Fighter (1987)
- Strider (1989)
- Super Cobra (1981)
- Tempest (1981)
- Track & Field (1983)
- Tron^{1} (1982)
- TwinBee (1985)
- Wonder Boy (1986)
- World Stadium (1988)
- Xevious (1982)
- Zaxxon (1982)

=== Consoles and home computers ===
- Adventure Island (1986)
- Alien^{1} (1982)
- Alternate Reality (1985)
- Alex Kidd (1986)
- The Bard's Tale (1985)
- Batman^{1} (1986)
- BattleTech (1988)
- Blaster Master (1988)
- Bomberman^{2} (1983)
- Bonk (1989)
- Boulder Dash (1984)
- Carmen Sandiego (1985)
- Castlevania (1986)
- Chip's Challenge (1989)
- Choplifter (1982)
- Dizzy (1987)
- Dragon Ball^{1} (1986)
- Dragon Quest (1986)
- Dragon Slayer (1984)
- Dungeons & Dragons (1988)
- Dungeon Explorer (1989)
- Dungeon Master (1987)
- Elite (1984)
- Excitebike (1984)
- Famicom Detective Club (1988)
- Family Stadium (1986)
- Final Fantasy (1987)
- Fire Pro Wrestling (1989)
- G.I. Joe^{1} (1983)
- Godzilla^{1} (1983)
- Giana Sisters (1987)
- Horace (1982)
- James Bond^{1} (1983)
- Jetpac (1983)
- Kid Icarus (1986)
- King's Quest (1980)
- Last Ninja (1987)
- The Legend of Heroes (1989)
- The Legend of Zelda (1986)
- Leisure Suit Larry (1987)
- Lode Runner (1983)
- Madden NFL (1988)
- Maniac Mansion (1987)
- Manic Miner (1983)
- MechWarrior^{2} (1989)
- Mega Man (1987)
- Megami Tensei (1987)
- Metal Gear (1987)
- Metroid (1986)
- Microsoft Flight Simulator (1982)
- Middle-earth^{1} (1982)
- Might and Magic (1986)
- Monty Mole (1984)
- Mother (1989)
- Parodius (1988)
- Phantasie (1985)
- Phantasy Star (1987)
- Pitfall! (1982)
- Police Quest (1987)
- Populous (1989)
- Prince of Persia (1989)
- The Prisoner^{1} (1980)
- RealSports (1982)
- RoboCop^{1} (1988)
- Rocky's Boots (1982)
- Romance of the Three Kingdoms (1985)
- SaGa (1989)
- Shadow of the Beast (1989)
- SimCity (1989)
- Space Quest (1986)
- Spider-Man^{1} (1982)
- Star Raiders (1980)
- Star Soldier (1986)
- Super Mario^{2} (1985)
- Teenage Mutant Ninja Turtles^{1} (1989)
- Test Drive (1987)
- Tetris (1985)
- Thunder Force (1983)
- Ultima (1981)
- Wasteland (1988)
- Wizardry (1981)
- Wolfenstein (1981)
- X-Men^{1} (1989)
- Ys (1987)

Notes:

- ^{1}Game franchises that also accompany major film or television franchises.
- ^{2}Game franchises that are considered spin-offs of previously established franchises.

== Financial performance ==
=== Highest-grossing arcade games of the decade ===
The following titles were the highest-grossing arcade video games of each year in the 1980s, in terms of coin drop earnings.

Highest-grossing arcade games of the 1980s
Year	Market	Chart(s)	Title	Revenue	Inflation	Developer	Manufacturer(s)	Genre	Ref
1980	Worldwide	—N/a	Pac-Man	$6 billion	$20 billion	Namco	Namco / Midway	Maze	
1981	Worldwide	—N/a	Pac-Man	$6 billion	$20 billion	Namco	Namco / Midway	Maze	
1982	Worldwide	—N/a	Pac-Man	$6 billion	$20 billion	Namco	Namco / Midway	Maze	
1983	Worldwide	—N/a	Pole Position	Unknown		Namco	Namco / Atari	Racing	
1984	UK	Unknown	Track & Field	Unknown		Konami	Konami	Olympic sports	
1984	USA	AMOA	Pole Position	Unknown		Namco	Atari	Racing	
1984	USA	RePlay	Pole Position II	Unknown		Namco	Atari	Racing	
1985	UK	Unknown	Commando	Unknown		Capcom	Capcom	Run-and-gun	
1985	USA	Play Meter	Hang-On	Unknown		Sega	Sega	Racing	
1985	USA	RePlay	Karate Champ	Unknown		Technōs	Data East	Fighting	
1986	Japan	Game Machine	Hang-On	Unknown		Sega	Sega	Racing	
1986	UK	Electrocoin (London)	Nemesis (Gradius)	Unknown		Konami	Konami	Scrolling shooter	
1986	USA	Play Meter	Gauntlet	Unknown		Atari Games	Atari Games	Hack-and-slash	
1986	USA	RePlay	Hang-On	Unknown		Sega	Sega	Racing	
1987	Japan	Gamest / Game Machine	Out Run	Unknown		Sega	Sega	Driving	
1987	USA	Play Meter	Out Run	Unknown		Sega	Sega	Driving	
1988	Japan	Gamest / Game Machine	After Burner	Unknown		Sega	Sega	Air combat	
1988	Hong Kong	Bondeal	RoboCop	Unknown		Data East	Data East	Action	
1988	UK	Unknown	Operation Wolf	Unknown		Taito	Taito	Light gun shooter	
1988	USA	Play Meter	Double Dragon	Unknown		Technōs	Taito	Beat 'em up	
1989	Japan	Dedicated cabinet	Final Lap	Unknown		Namco	Namco	Racing	
1989	Japan	Conversion kit	Tetris	Unknown		Sega	Sega	Puzzle	
1989	USA	AMOA (dedicated)	Double Dragon	Unknown		Technōs	Taito	Beat 'em up	
1989	USA	AMOA (conversion kit)	Capcom Bowling	Unknown		Strata	Capcom	Sports	
1989	USA	RePlay (dedicated)	Super Off Road	Unknown		Leland	Leland	Racing	
1989	USA	RePlay (conversion kit)	Ninja Gaiden	Unknown		Tecmo	Tecmo	Beat 'em up	

=== Best-selling home video games of the decade ===
The following table lists the top 20 best-selling home video games of the 1980s. Note that video game sales numbers were not as widely reported during the 1980s, with the exception of titles published by Nintendo and Atari, Inc.

Best-selling home video games of the 1980s (as of 2015)
No.	Title	Units sold	Initial release date	Platform(s)	Genre	Developer	Publisher(s)	Ref
1	Super Mario Bros.	40.24 million	September 13, 1985	NES	Platformer	Nintendo R&D4	Nintendo	
2	Tetris (Game Boy)	35 million	June 14, 1989	Game Boy	Puzzle	Nintendo R&D1	Nintendo	
3	Duck Hunt	28.31 million	April 29, 1984	NES	Light gun shooter	Nintendo R&D1	Nintendo	
4	Super Mario Land	18.14 million	April 21, 1989	Game Boy	Platformer	Nintendo R&D1	Nintendo	
5	Super Mario Bros. 3	17.28 million	October 23, 1988	NES	Platformer	Nintendo EAD	Nintendo	
6	Donkey Kong	15.05 million	June 1982	G&W, Coleco, Atari, NES	Platformer	Nintendo R&D1	Coleco, Atari Corporation	(Note: Game & Watch version sold 8 million. ColecoVision version sold 2 million. Atari VCS version sold 4 million in 1982, and 180,523 between 1987 and 1990. Famicom version sold 840,000. Atari 8-bit computer version sold 25,502.)
7	Pac-Man	11.15 million	1982	VCS, Coleco, NES, PC	Maze	Namco	Atari, Coleco, Namco, Thunder Mountain	(Note: Pac-Man: Atari 2600 version (1982) – 8,095,586 game cartridges (7,956,413 by 1983, 139,173 between 1986 and 1990); Coleco tabletop version (1982) – 1.5 million units; Pac-Man Nelsonic Game Watch (1982) – 500,000+ units; Family Computer (Famicom) version – 480,000 cartridges in Japan; Atari 5200 version – 35,011 cartridges (between 1986 and 1988); Atari XE computer version – 42,359 copies (between 1986 and 1990); Thunder Mountain's home computer budget release (1986) – 500,000+ copies)
8	Tetris (NES)	8 million	November 1989	NES	Puzzle	Nintendo R&D1	Nintendo	
9	Super Mario Bros. 2	7.46 million	October 9, 1988	NES	Platformer	Nintendo EAD	Nintendo	
10	The Legend of Zelda	6.51 million	February 21, 1986	NES	Action-adventure	Nintendo EAD	Nintendo	
11	Space Invaders	6.09 million	March 1980	Atari VCS	Shoot 'em up	Taito	Atari, Inc.	(Note: 1,318,655 in 1980. 2,964,137 in 1981. 1,373,033 in 1982. 435,353 in 1983.)
12	The Last Ninja 2	5.5 million	August 29, 1988	Computers	Action-adventure	System 3	Activision	
13	Pitfall!	5 million	April 20, 1982	Multi-platform	Platformer	Activision	Activision	
14	Zelda II: The Adventure of Link	4.38 million	January 14, 1987	NES	Action role-playing	Nintendo EAD	Nintendo	
15	Excitebike	4.16 million	November 30, 1984	NES	Racing	Nintendo R&D1	Nintendo	
16	Frogger	4.1 million	August 1982	Atari VCS, Computers	Action	Konami	Parker Brothers, Sierra On-Line	(Note: The Atari VCS version by Parker Brothers sold 4 million cartridges in 1982. Sierra's home computer version sold more than 100,000 copies in the United States by 1985.)
17	Where in the World Is Carmen Sandiego?	4 million	June 1, 1985	Multi-platform	Educational	Broderbund	Broderbund	
17	The Last Ninja	4 million	1987	Commodore 64	Action-adventure	System 3	Activision	
17	Teenage Mutant Ninja Turtles	4 million	May 12, 1989	NES	Action-platformer	Konami	Ultra Games	
17	Populous	4 million	June 5, 1989	Multi-platform	God game	Bullfrog Productions	Electronic Arts	

=== Best-selling home systems of the decade ===
The following table lists the top 20 best-selling home systems in the 1980s, including home video game consoles, handheld game consoles, handheld electronic games, and personal computers.

Best-selling home systems in the 1980s
No.	System(s)	Manufacturer	Type	Generation	Release	Hardware sales						Software sales	
No.	System(s)	Manufacturer	Type	Generation	Release	Japan	USA	Europe	Korea	Worldwide	As of	USA	As of
1	Famicom / NES	Nintendo	Console	Third	1983	14,630,000	20,800,000+	1,000,000	20,000	36,450,000	1989	101,500,000	1989
2	Game & Watch	Nintendo	Handheld	—N/a	1980	—N/a	—N/a	—N/a	—N/a	18,600,000+	1982	—N/a	—N/a
3	Atari 2600 (Atari VCS)	Atari	Console	Second	1977	—N/a	—N/a	—N/a	—N/a	18,450,000+	1986	Unknown	Unknown
4	Commodore 64	Commodore	Computer	8-bit	1982	—N/a	—N/a	—N/a	—N/a	13,700,000	1989	Unknown	Unknown
5	IBM PC	IBM	Computer	8/16-bit	1981	—N/a	—N/a	—N/a	—N/a	6,952,600+ (Note: 3.575 million up until 1984. 1.4 million in 1985. 1.229 million in 1988. 748,600+ in 1989.)	1989	Unknown	Unknown
6	ZX81 / ZX Spectrum	Sinclair	Computer	8-bit	1981	—N/a	—N/a	—N/a	—N/a	5,000,000	1985	Unknown	Unknown
7	Apple II	Apple Inc.	Computer	8-bit	1977	—N/a	—N/a	—N/a	—N/a	4,487,000	1989	Unknown	Unknown
8	NEC UltraLite / PC-88 / PC-98	NEC	Computer	8/16-bit	1981	4,040,000 (Note: See Market share of personal computer vendors § Japan.)	211,000+	Unknown	Unknown	4,251,000+	1989	Unknown	Unknown
9	Famicom Disk System	Nintendo	Console	8-bit	1986	4,000,000	—N/a	—N/a	—N/a	4,000,000	1989	Unknown	Unknown
10	MSX	ASCII Corp.	Computer	8-bit	1983	—N/a	—N/a	—N/a	—N/a	4,000,000	1989	Unknown	Unknown
11	Sega Mark III/Master System	Sega	Console	Third	1985	1,440,000	1,665,000+	700,000	130,000	3,935,000+	1989	Unknown	Unknown
12	Macintosh	Apple Inc.	Computer	16-bit	1984	—N/a	—N/a	—N/a	—N/a	3,502,000	1989	Unknown	Unknown
13	Intellivision	Mattel	Console	Second	1979	—N/a	—N/a	—N/a	—N/a	3,000,000+	1983		
14	Coleco Mini-Arcade	Coleco	Dedicated	—N/a	1982	—N/a	3,000,000	—N/a	—N/a	3,000,000	1982	—N/a	—N/a
15	PC Engine/TurboGrafx-16	NEC	Console	8/16-bit	1987	2,350,000	300,000	Unknown	Unknown	2,650,000+	1989	Unknown	
16	Game Boy	Nintendo	Handheld	8-bit	1989	1,480,000	1,000,000	—N/a	—N/a	2,500,000	1989	Unknown	
17	ColecoVision	Coleco	Console	Second	1982	—N/a	2,000,000	Unknown	Unknown	2,000,000+	1984	Unknown	
18	Amstrad CPC	Amstrad	Computer	8-bit	1984	—N/a	Unknown	2,000,000	—N/a	2,000,000+	1989	Unknown	
19	Atari 8-bit computers	Atari	Computer	8-bit	1979	—N/a	—N/a	—N/a	—N/a	1,900,000	1989	Unknown	
20	Amiga	Commodore	Computer	16-bit	1985	—N/a	—N/a	—N/a	—N/a	1,600,000	1989	Unknown	

== Hardware timeline ==
The following gallery highlights hardware used to predominantly play games throughout the 1980s.

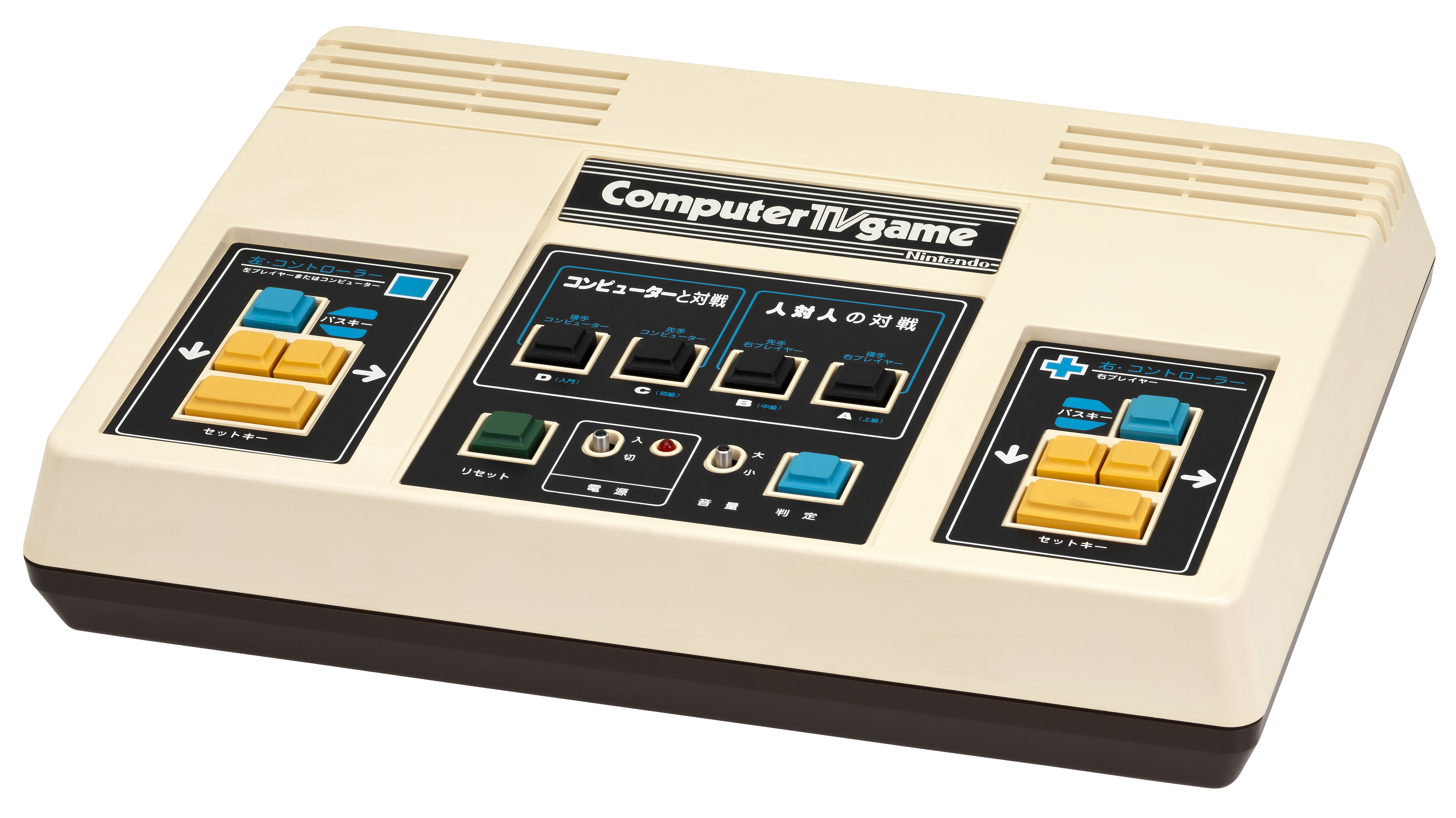
Computer TV-Game (1980)

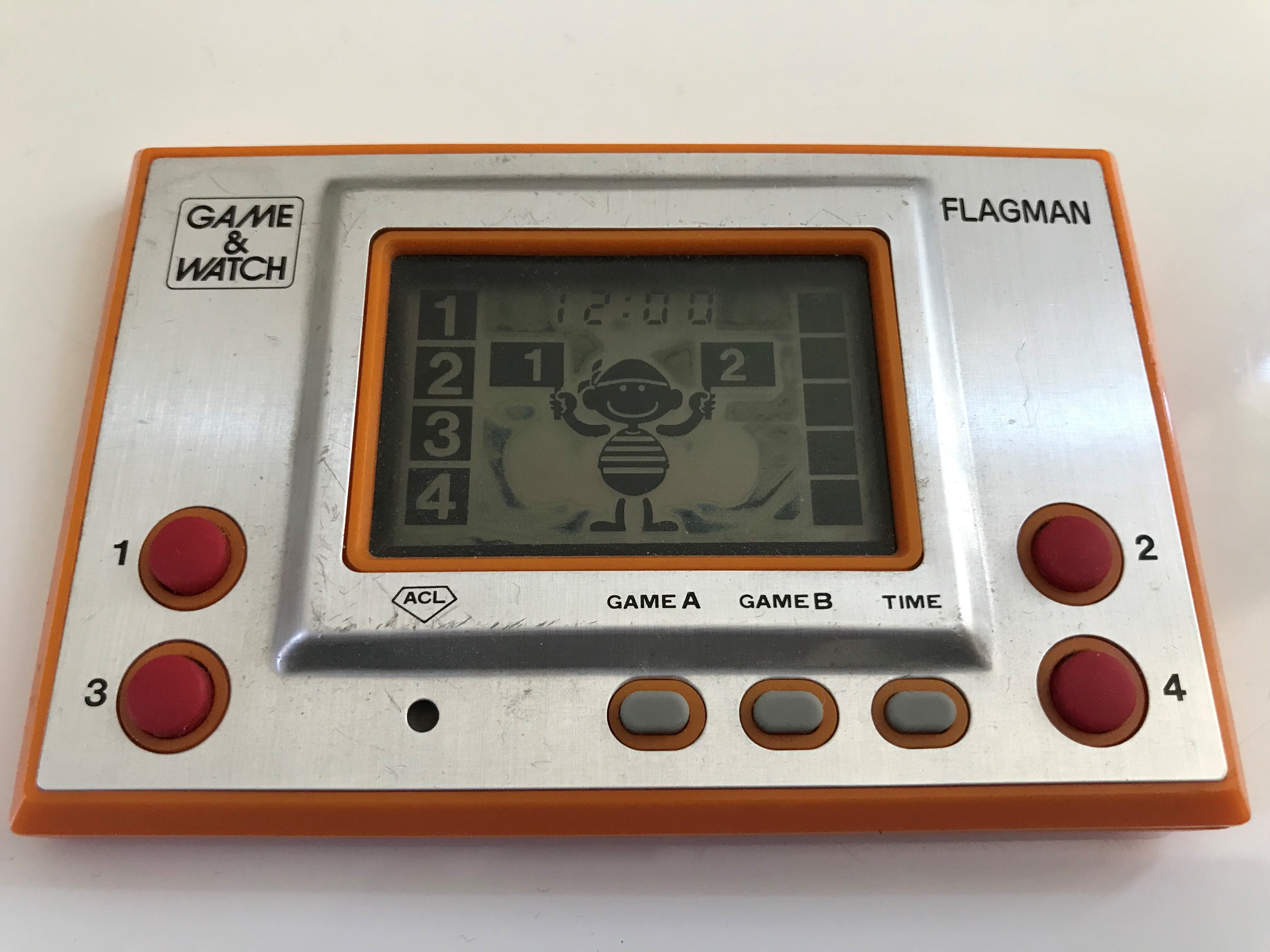
Game & Watch (1980)

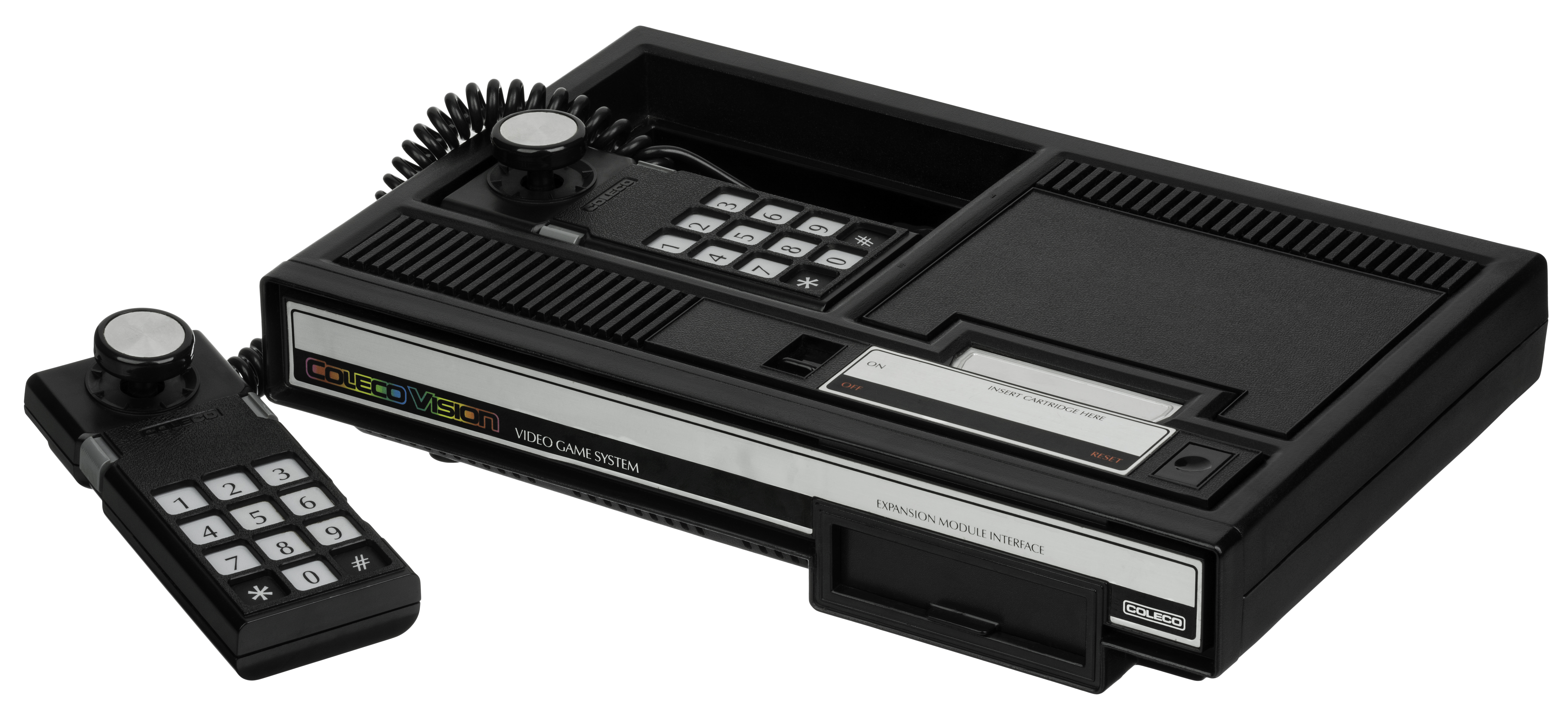
ColecoVision (1982)

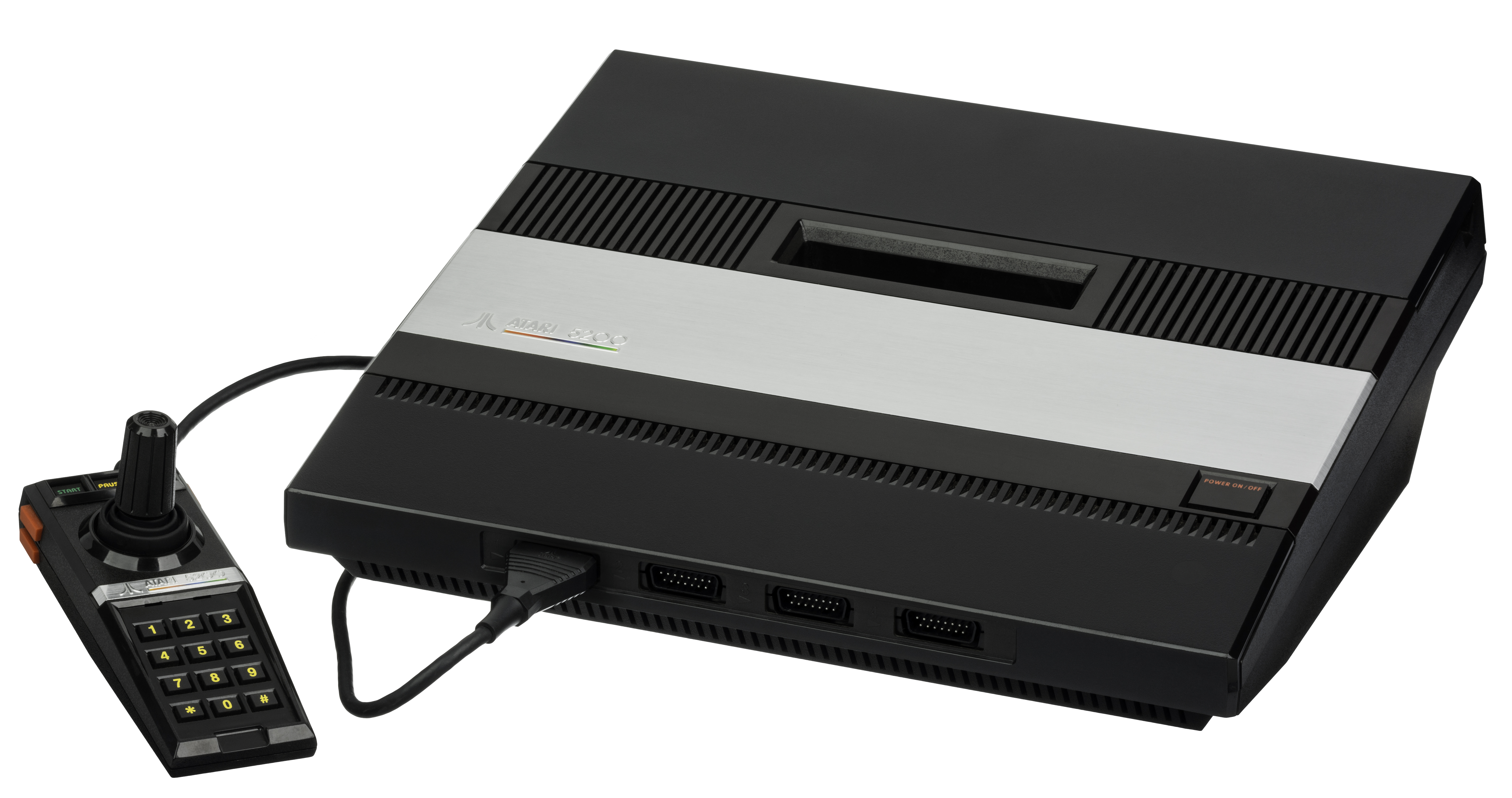
Atari 5200 (1982)

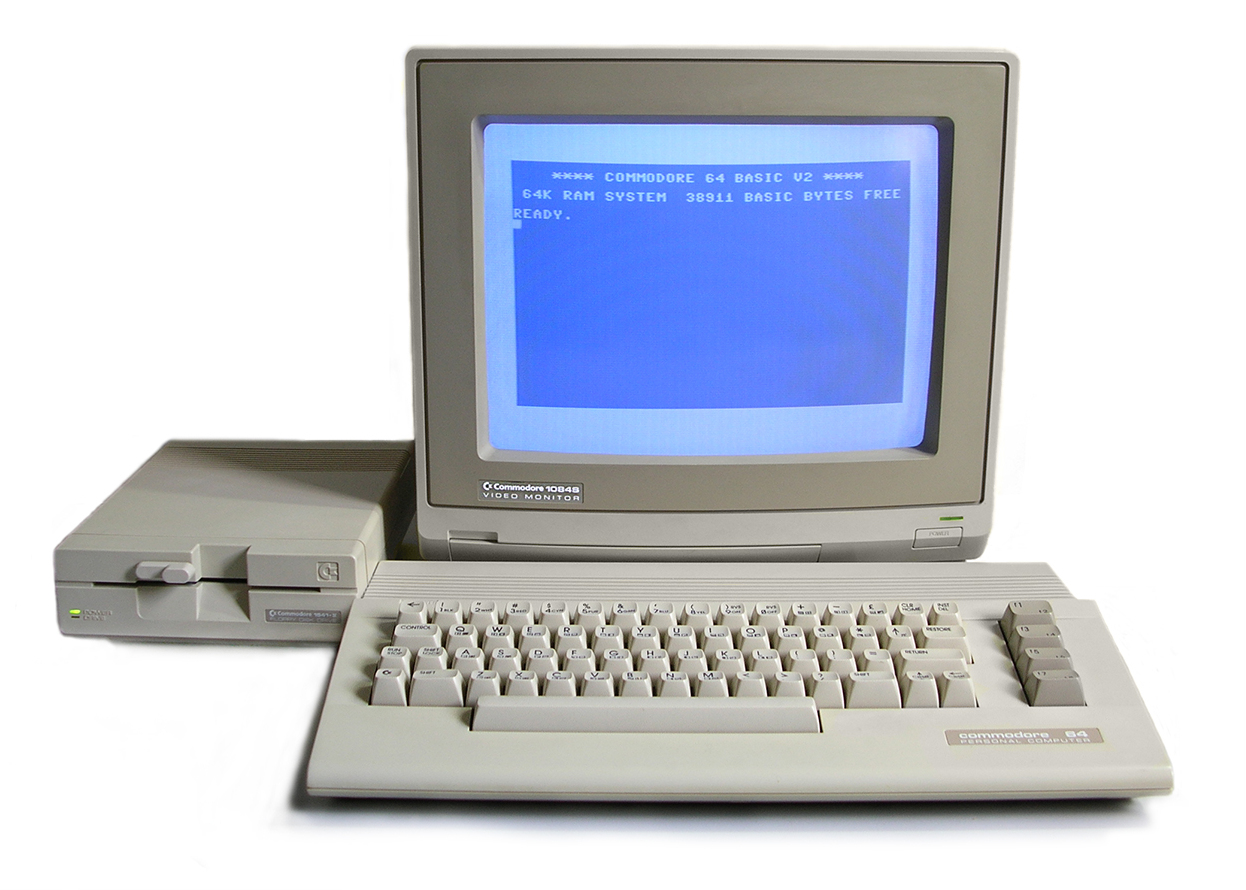
Commodore 64 (1982)

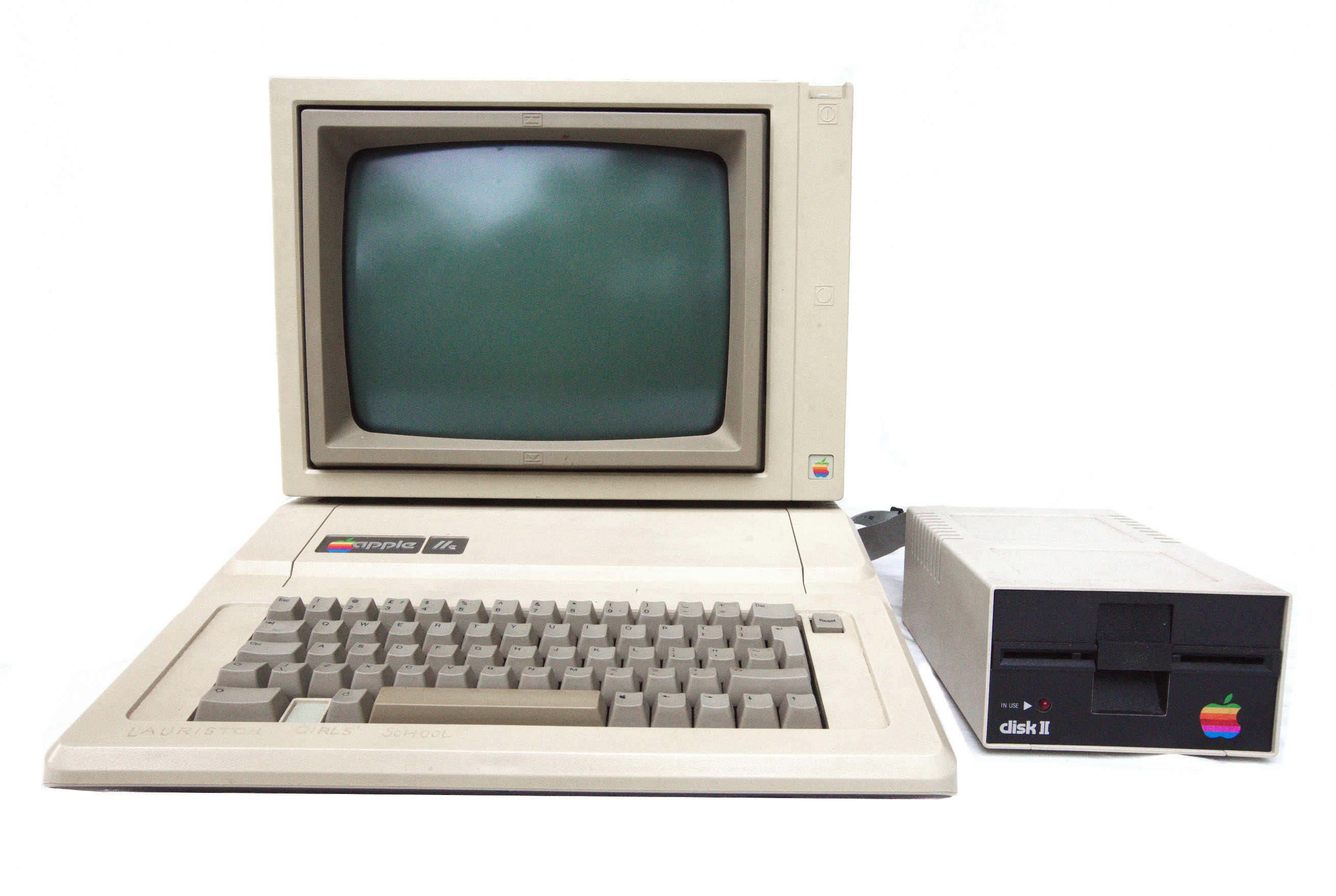
Apple IIe (1983)

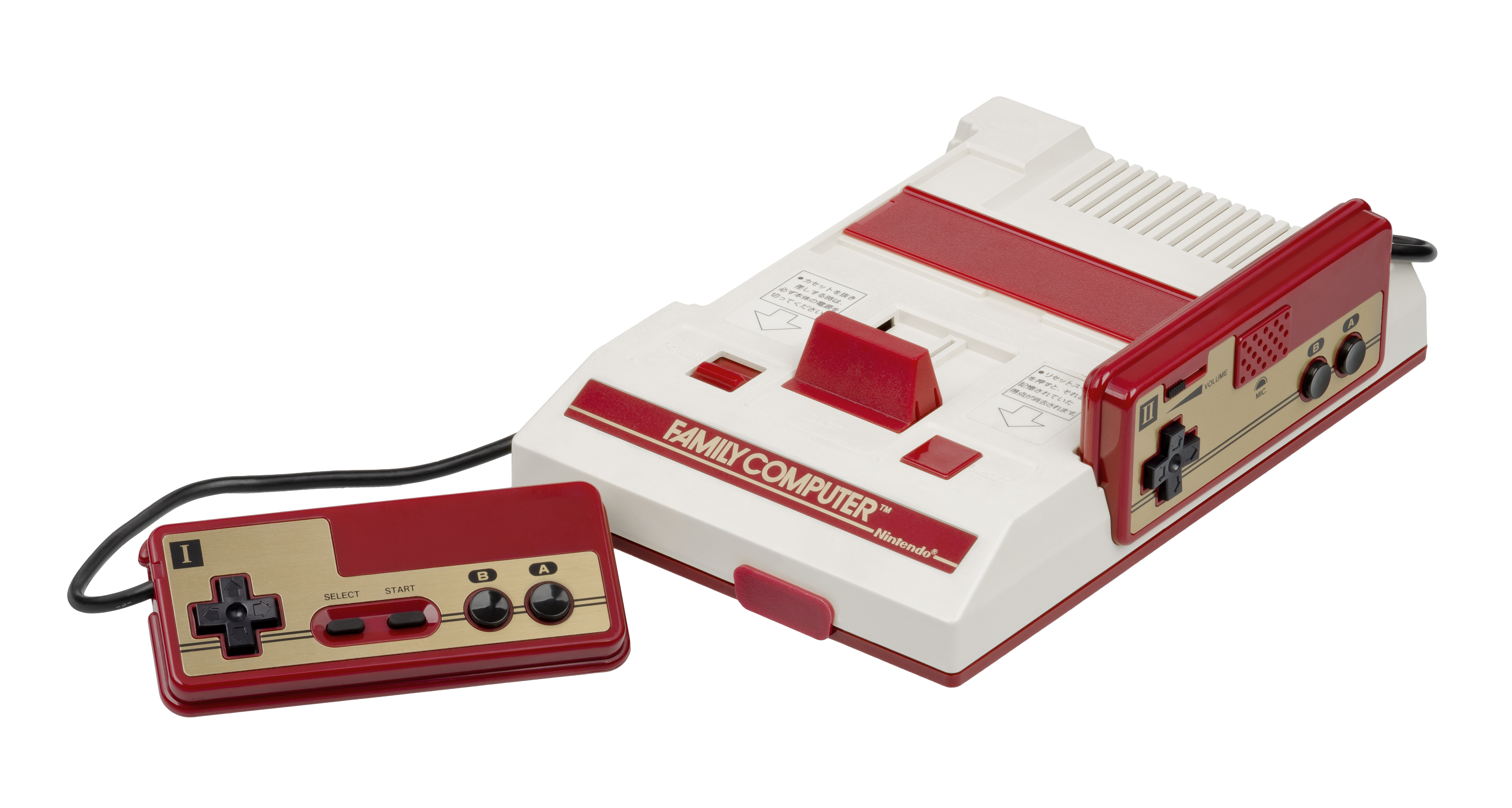
Famicom/Nintendo Entertainment System (1983)

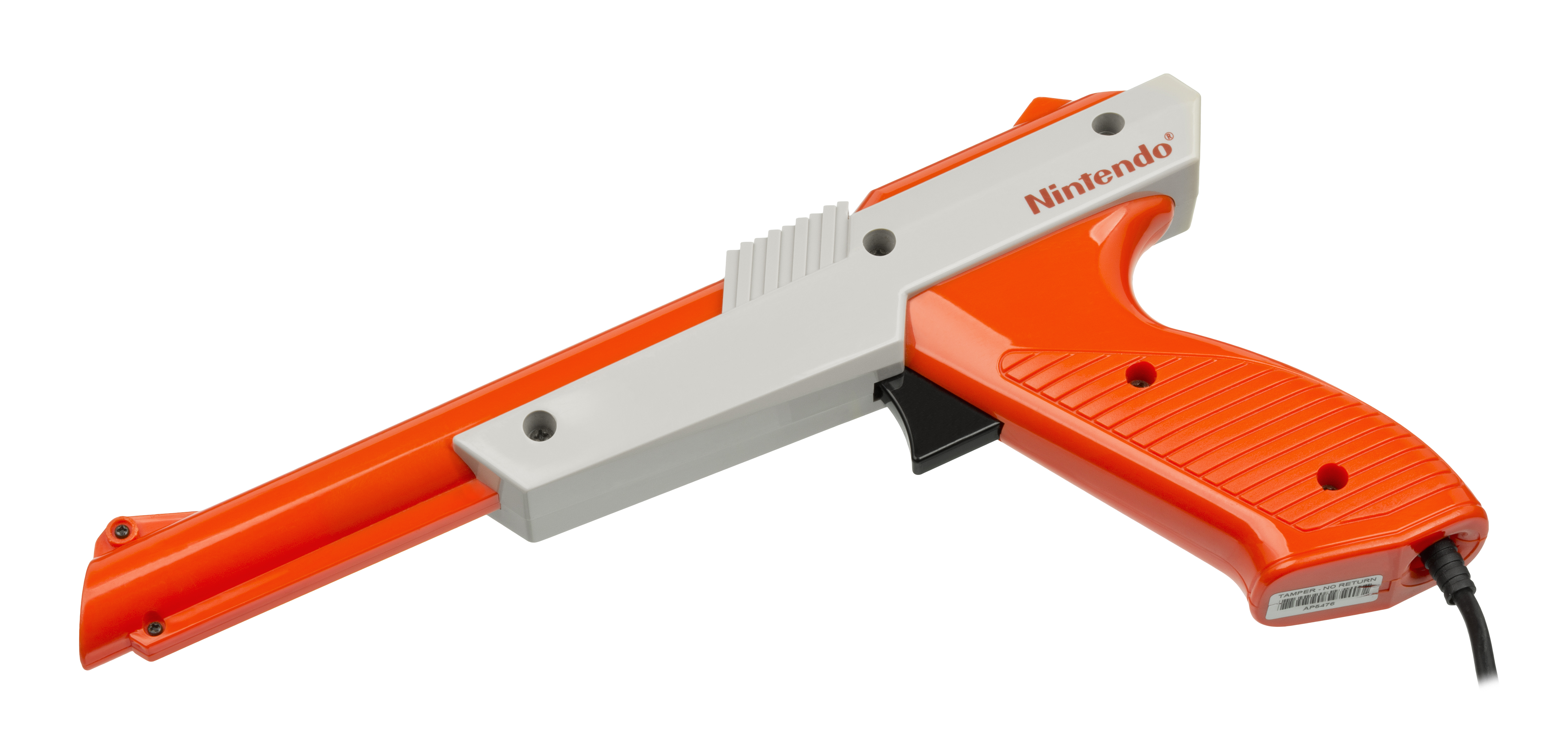
NES Zapper/Video Shooting Series light gun (1985)

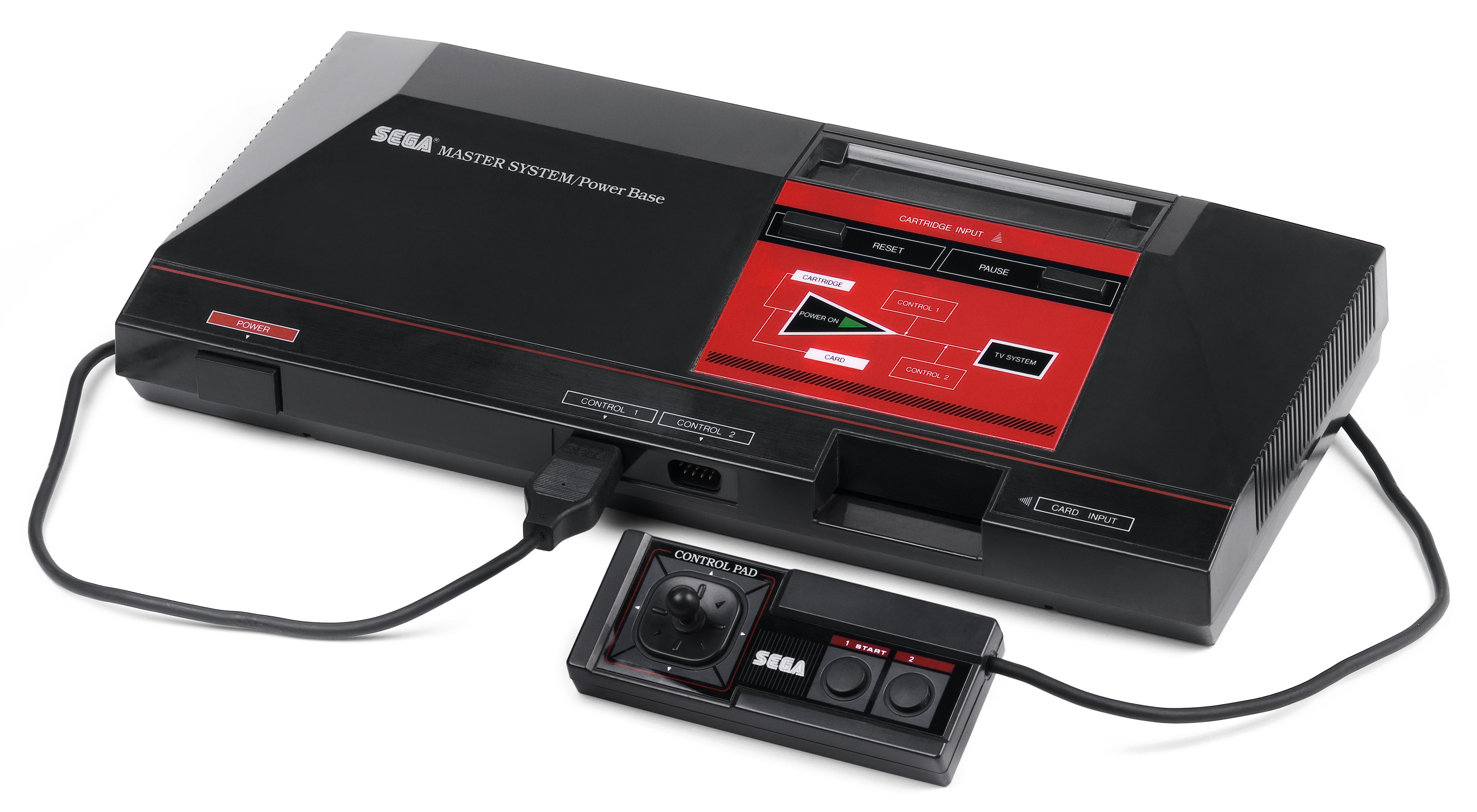
Mark III/Master System (1985)

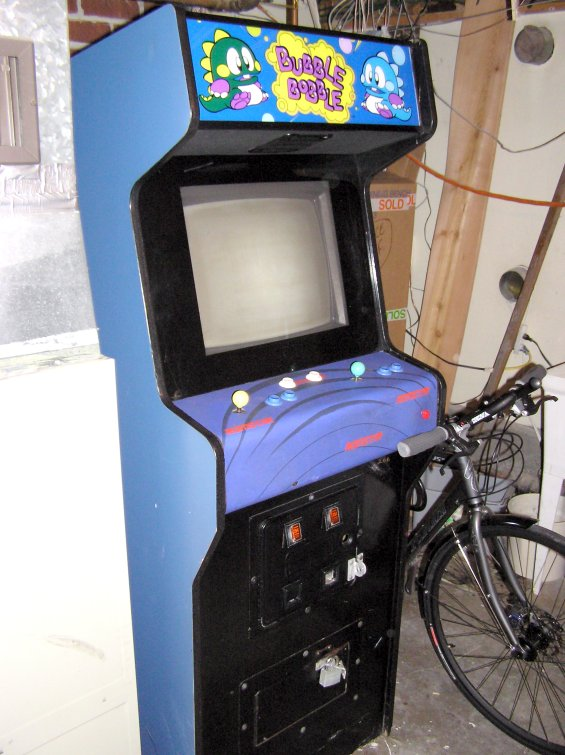
Bubble Bobble (1986)

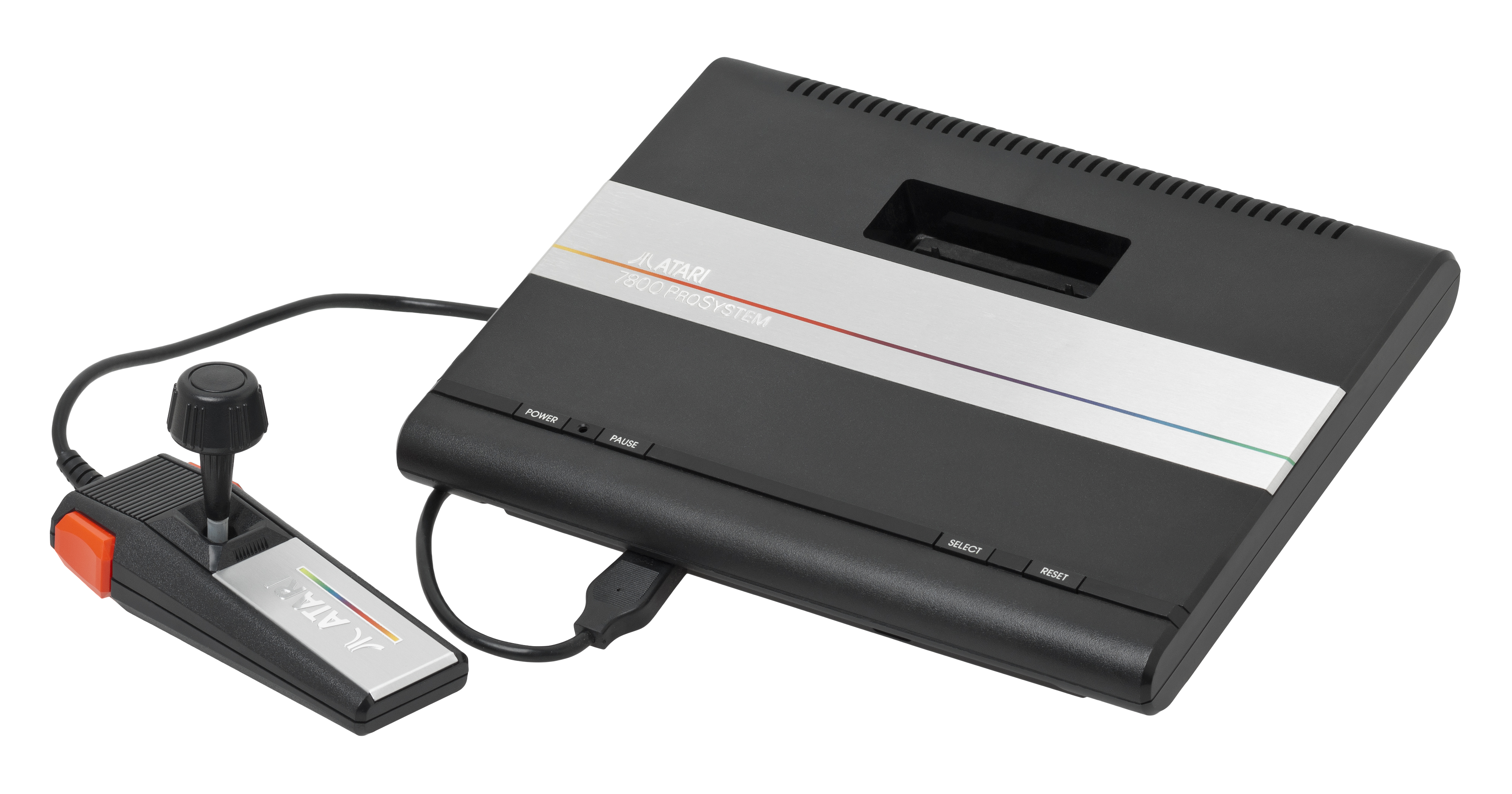
Atari 7800 (1986)

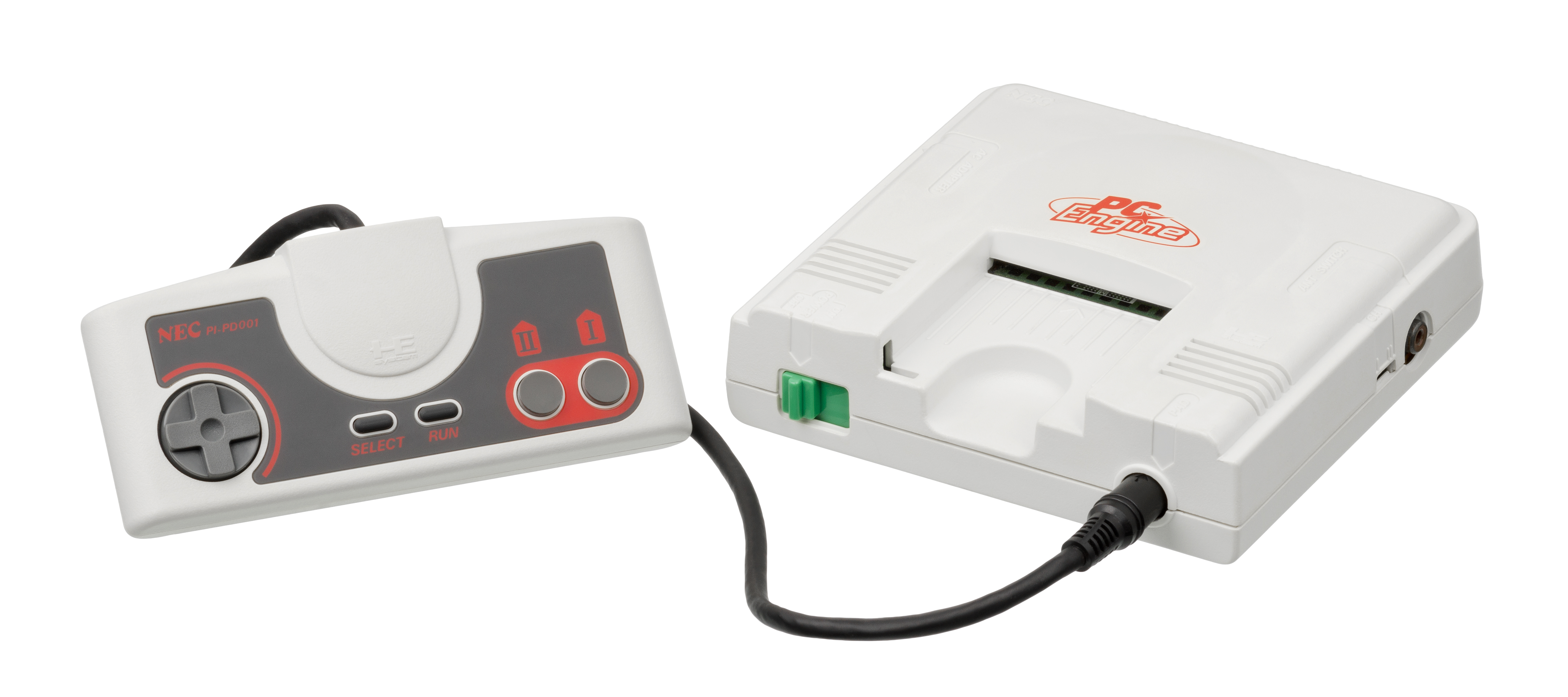
TurboGrafx-16/PC Engine (1987)

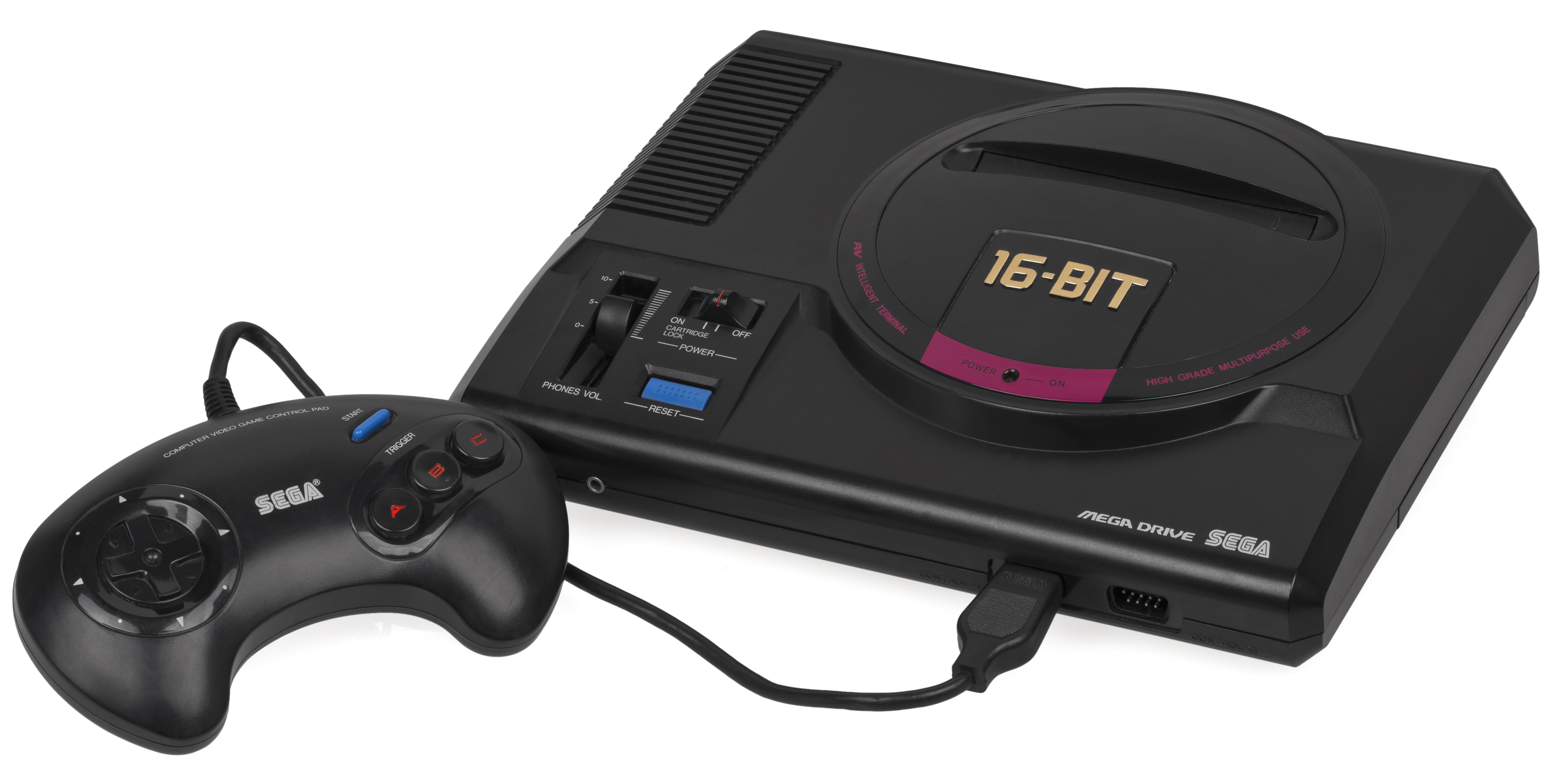
Mega Drive/Genesis (1988)

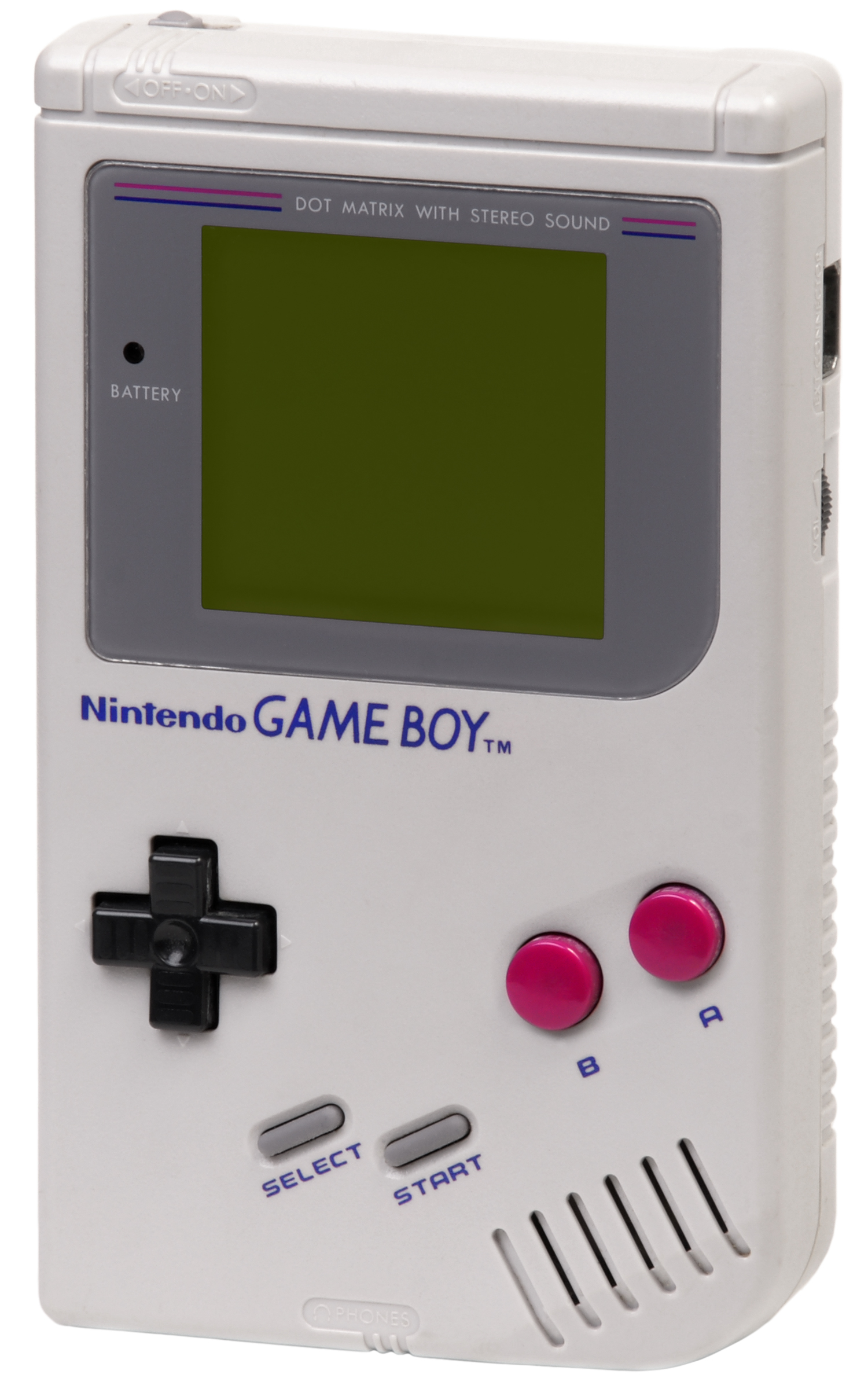
Game Boy (1989)

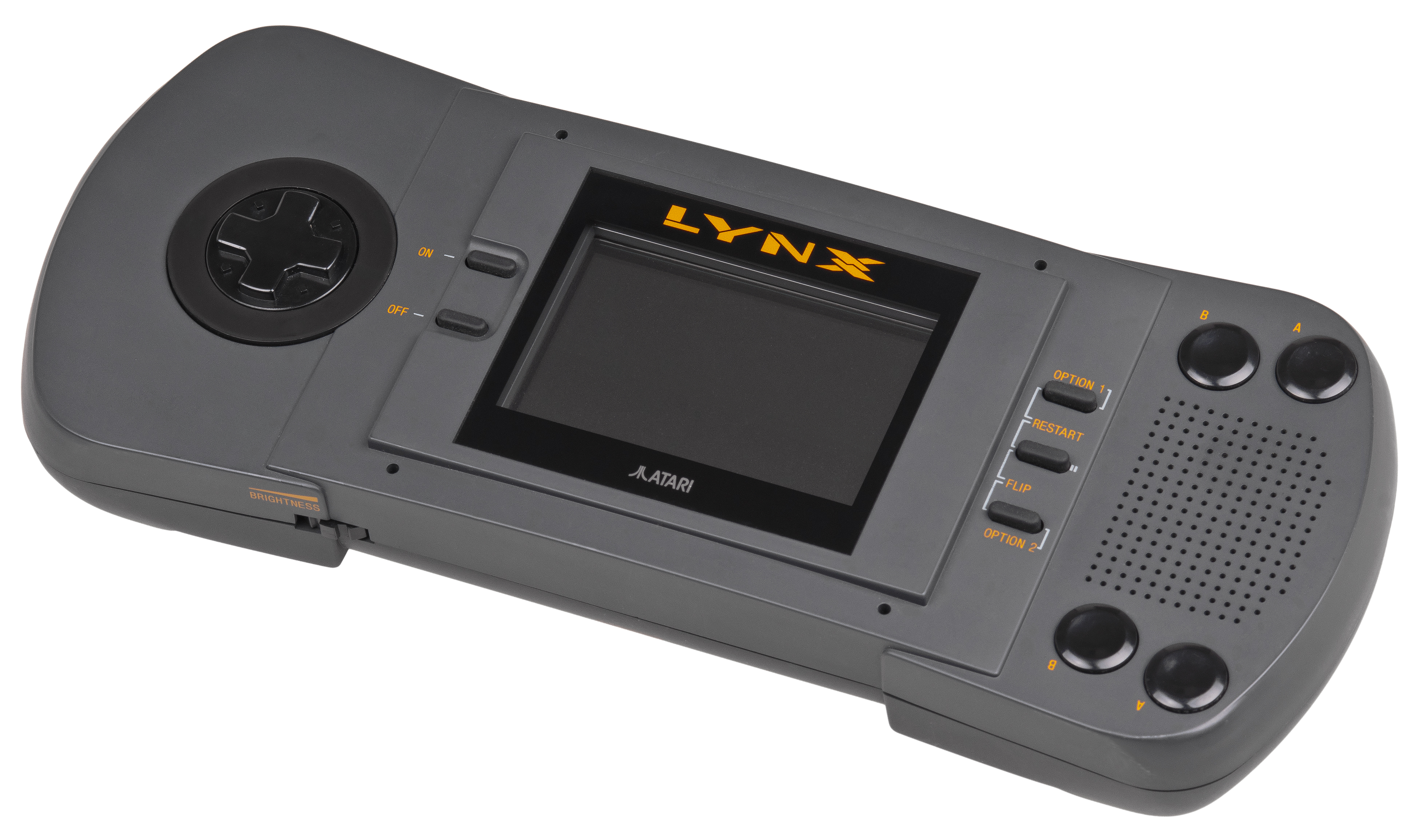
Atari Lynx (1989)
