= Last Ninja 3 =

1991 video game

- C64 cover art
- Developer: System 3
- Publishers: Commodore Gaming; Kixx (re-release)
- Director: Adrian Cale
- Producer: Mark Cale
- Designers: Stan Schembri; Adrian Cale; Mark Cale; Tim Best
- Programmers: Mark Dawson; Dave Collins
- Artists: Paul 'Dokk' Docherty; Robin Levy; Guy Jeffries; Tony Hagar
- Composers: Reyn Ouwehand; Justin Scharvona (Atari ST)
- Series: Last Ninja
- Platforms: Commodore 64, Amiga, Atari ST, CD32
- Release: 1991; Amiga, Atari ST; March 1991; CD32; 1993; Virtual Console: EU: 2008
- Genre: Action-adventure
- Mode: Single-player

Last Ninja 3 is an action-adventure video game developed and published by System 3 for the Commodore 64, Amiga, Atari ST in 1991 and the Amiga CD32 in 1993. It is a sequel to the 1988 game Last Ninja 2.

== Plot ==
In Last Ninja 3, the protagonist Armakuni, known as the Last Ninja, is the sole surviving member of an ancient order of mystic shadow warriors from ninth-century feudal Japan, dedicated to upholding the principles of good against the forces of evil. His arch-enemy, the evil Shogun Kunitoki, harbors deep envy for the ninja's mystical powers and has sworn their total destruction to seize their knowledge of Ninjitsu. This longstanding feud traces back to Kunitoki's massacre of the ninja brotherhood, which Armakuni has vowed to avenge through repeated epic confrontations across time and space, including battles on the island of Lin Fen (as seen in The Last Ninja) and in modern-day New York City (as seen in Last Ninja 2). After these encounters, Armakuni had begun training a new generation of ninjas using sacred Koga scrolls, fostering a revitalized order blending elder masters and young students.

The story's central conflict ignites when, during a training session, mystical energies summon Armakuni to the sacred Buddhist temples in the Tibetan mountains—the spiritual heart of Ninjitsu—where time itself stands still and a pulsating light transports him into action. Kunitoki, having evaded final defeat previously, has invaded these temples to corrupt their essence, targeting the five elemental chambers representing Earth, Water, Wind, Fire and Void, which house the core of the ninjas' inner power and mystical strength. Armakuni's mission is to traverse these chambers, confront Kunitoki's henchmen and collect essential items like scrolls and weapons to thwart the corruption, as failure would doom the new ninja brotherhood and erase Ninjitsu's legacy forever.

== Gameplay ==
Commodore 64 version screenshot

The player takes control of the ninja protagonist, Armakuni, who must fight his way through the five levels populated by opponents, collecting necessary items in the process. As per the first two games in the series, the game is presented in an isometric view and the ninja can move in eight different directions and jump.

If the player approaches an item that can be picked up, a picture of the item is briefly shown in the top right of the screen on a prayer wheel. Collecting items and using them in the correct place is necessary to progress and ultimately complete the game.

On each level is a potion which can be picked up to restore the player's health to full, and also a scroll which allows the player to exit the level.

Unlike the first two games in the series, the player can accumulate Bushido power through honorable combat, such as matching a foe's chosen weapon or engaging hand-to-hand without fleeing, which is vital for advancing through the levels.

The game culminates in a direct showdown with Kunitoki in the heart of the corrupted temples, where Armakuni's victory restores balance to the spiritual sources, preserving the ninjas' mystical heritage and ensuring the endurance of their moral code against encroaching darkness.

== Development and release ==
The Amiga and Atari ST versions of Last Ninja 3, as developed by System 3, began development in September 1990, and were released in the March 1991 for the Amiga and Atari ST. The game was originally written for the Amiga, and it was the basis for the Atari ST version.

Adrian Cale, the co-director of Last Ninja 3, stated that the game was conceived because "the Ninja games have almost become a genre in their own right. People buy them because they specifically want that type of game. ... years ago Last Ninja was state of the art on 8-bit machines, we're now trying to make it state of the art on 16-bit". Unlike its predecessors, Last Ninja 3 may have more than one enemy on-screen at once. Alongside this, the enemy AI was improved: Stan Schembri, a designer for Last Ninja 3, said that they are "a lot more intelligent", further stating that "they attempt to react to the way you move. In Ninja 2 if you were fighting that was it. In this one if you make a slight move, an enemy will try to come round to fight you from the back". Last Ninja 3 was designed with arcade-style gameplay in mind: this manifests in the form of changes to Ninja 3's combat, and the addition of bosses. Due to these gameplay changes, the game's joystick controls are also altered: while previous Last Ninja games have controls for turning and moving separately, the protagonist now faces and moves in the same direction the stick is pushed.

Last Ninja 3's graphics were intentionally made aesthetically different from previous games in the series. Cale said that some of the game's enemies are "more fantasy oriented", as opposed to "a load of guys in karate gear". Cale further expressed that the Last Ninja 3 team "tried to create character animation that hasn't been seen in other games", with making the animations 'realistic' being a priority. The One expressed that the development team also prioritized walkcycle animations, with the graphic artists seeking to avoid characters 'looking like they're skating'. Last Ninja 3 has larger sprites than its predecessors: the protagonist's sprite is double the size of that of previous games. The 16-bit versions of Last Ninja 3 were programmed by Mark Dawson and Dave Collins from the game studio Eldritch the Cat. Despite the size of Last Ninja 3's sprites, they don't use much processor time: the game's 3D masking uses more processing power, with about 200 layers of masking per screen. According to Collins and Dawson, the game's 3D masking was one of the hardest aspects to code. Dawson primarily programmed the Atari ST version.

In a retrospective interview in 2005, System 3's Mark Cale felt that the game was "by no means the best entry in the series", blaming the breakup of the original Last Ninja series team, stating that "when working with such talented people as John Twiddy and Hugh Riley, there was always a certain amount of magic and things just flowed. With some other developers, they were always trying to escape the nemesis of the past. I think the programmers on Ninja 3 were always trying to outdo John Twiddy, rather than make a great game. It wasn't as good as it should have been".

== Ports ==
An MS-DOS version by Dave Collins was in development, but never released. Rather than using a PC running PDS for development like previous System 3 games, Last Ninja 3 was programmed on Intel 80386 PCs with SNASM boards. Collins & Dawson expressed that the 386 PCs & SNASM boards eased Last Ninja 3's development, and stated that they "mak[e] life far easier. You can look through memory on your PC and all sorts of things easily".

Last Ninja 3 was re-released on the Virtual Console in Europe in 2008. Last Ninja 3 was pulled from the European Virtual Console storefront in 2010 due to a bug in the game which resulted in the game freezing after the first level, which was present since its release in 2008.

== Reception ==
Reception

Review scores
Publication	Score
Computer + Video Games	94% (C64)
Zzap!	93% (C64)
CU Amiga	90% (Amiga)
The One	90% (Amiga)
Amiga Format	81% (Amiga)
Amiga Power	80% (Amiga)

According to Mark Cale, about 3 million copies were sold. The game was very well received by the press. The Amiga version reviews included the review scores of 81% from Amiga Format, 80% Amiga Power, and 90% from CU Amiga. The C64 version was further acclaimed, including the scores of 94% from Computer + Video Games and 93% from Zzap!.

British gaming magazine The One gave the Amiga version of Last Ninja 3 an overall score of 90%, and noted the incorporation of console and arcade-style gameplay elements. The One praised Last Ninja 3's new weapons and moves, and favorably expressed that these do not "dilute the game's challenge", further remarking that these elements "bring it to another level of playability". The One praised Last Ninja 3's complex and creative puzzles and map design, and detailed larger sprites, along with "good visual details" and effects, such as motion blur on weapons being swung. They called the game unoriginal and somewhat dated due to developments in the graphic adventure genre, but also stated that it was fun, challenging, and "a classic".
