= Last Ninja 2 =

1988 video game

Last Ninja 2: Back with a Vengeance
- Commodore 64 cover art by Joe Roth
- Developers: System 3 Beam Software
- Publishers: Activision; Ubi Soft (10 Megahits Vol. 3); Ocean Software (100% Dynamite); Jaleco
- Producers: Mark Cale; Tim Best
- Designers: Mark Cale; Tim Best; Hugh Riley
- Programmers: John Twiddy; Mev Dinc
- Artist: Hugh Riley
- Writer: John Twiddy
- Composers: Matt Gray; Reyn Ouwehand (Remix); Tania Smith (NES)
- Series: Last Ninja
- Platforms: Last Ninja 2: 1988: Commodore 64, ZX Spectrum, Amstrad CPC; 1989: Acorn Electron, BBC Micro, 1990: Amiga, Atari ST, MS-DOS, NES (as The Last Ninja); 2008: Virtual Console; Last Ninja Remix: 1990: Commodore 64, ZX Spectrum, Amstrad CPC
- Release: 29 August 1988; 1990 (Last Ninja Remix)
- Genre: Action-adventure
- Mode: Single player

Last Ninja 2: Back with a Vengeance is an action-adventure video game developed and published by System 3 for the Commodore 64, ZX Spectrum and Amstrad CPC in 1988 as a sequel to the 1987 game The Last Ninja. The Acorn Electron, BBC Micro, 1990: Amiga, Atari ST, MS-DOS and NES ports followed in 1989. The NES version of the game was named simply The Last Ninja.

In 1990, the Last Ninja Remix edition of the game was re-released for 8-bit systems, which added a short intro sequence, minor graphic changes and a remixed soundtrack by Reyn Ouwehand.

The Limited Edition of the original release included a ninja mask and a rubber shuriken (not available with the Remix versions of the game).

A sequel, Last Ninja 3 was released in 1991.

== Gameplay ==
Commodore 64 version screenshot

The player, controlling a ninja, must fight his way through various levels populated by opponents, collecting necessary items in the process. Each level depicts a different locale and is divided into several screens. The game is presented in an isometric view and the ninja can move in eight different directions and jump.

Enemies, armed with fists and various ninja weapons, wander around the levels. The ninja must fight them either bare-handed or with the weaponry he finds along the way; in either case, he has a number of blows and attacks at his disposal, as well as the ability to block. There is a special weapon, shuriken, which are thrown in a straight line rather than used for melee combat; if they strike an enemy, they will instantly kill or at least severely damage them.

Various items are scattered around the levels, such as keys, a rope and a map; collecting these items and using them in a proper place is necessary for completing the game. There are also hamburgers that award an extra life when eaten.

== Plot ==
The game continues from the aftermath of the events of The Last Ninja. With the Koga scrolls now in his possession, Armakuni has begun training a new order of shadow warriors. During a training session, he is mysteriously transported to 20th-century New York City. Torn from his own time, Armakuni must defeat the evil shogun Kunitoki once more.

== Reception ==
Last Ninja 2 was an enormous commercial success. According to System 3's Mark Cale, 5.5 million copies were sold for the Commodore 64 version alone; at that time, the user base of the C64 was estimated at 20 million, meaning that one in four C64 owners bought the game.

It was a runner up for Game of the Year at the Golden Joystick Awards. In 2004, readers of Retro Gamer voted Last Ninja 2 as 68th top retro game.

8-bit versions
Platform	Magazine	Score	Accolade
Acorn Electron	Electron User	9/10	Golden Game
Commodore 64/128	The Games Machine	93%	Top Score
Commodore 64/128	Computer + Video Games	9/10	C+VG Hit!
Commodore 64/128	Commodore User	9/10	CU Super Star
Commodore 64/128	IGN	7.5/10	
Commodore 64/128	ACE	747/1000	
ZX Spectrum	Sinclair User	92%	
ZX Spectrum	Your Sinclair	9/10	
ZX Spectrum	Crash	90%	Crash Smash
ZX Spectrum	The Games Machine	89%	Top Score
16-bit versions
Platform	Magazine	Score	Accolade
Amiga	The Games Machine	70%	
Amiga	Amiga Format	58%	
Atari ST	Computer + Video Games	77%	
Atari ST	The Games Machine	70%	
DOS	Computer + Video Games	76%	
DOS	The Games Machine	73%	

== Legacy ==
In 2015 the source code of the Konix version was discovered.

The NES version would be re-released by City Connection on June 4, 2025 for the Nintendo Switch, as part of the Jalecolle label. This re-release marks the first time Last Ninja 2 was released in Japan.
