= The Last Ninja =

1987 video game

- Developers: System 3 Eclipse Software Design
- Publishers: Activision; Superior Software
- Designer: Mark Cale; Tim Best
- Artists: C64; Hugh Riley; Atari ST, Amiga; Hugh Riley; Erik Simon; Tim Lange; Apple II, MS-DOS; Erol Otus; Electron, BBC Micro; Peter Scott
- Composers: C64; Ben Daglish; Anthony Lees; Atari ST, Amiga; Jochen Hippel; Russell Lieblich
- Series: Last Ninja
- Platforms: Commodore 64, Apple IIGS, BBC Micro, Acorn Electron, MS-DOS, Apple II, Atari ST, Amiga, Archimedes
- Release: 1987
- Genre: Action-adventure
- Mode: Single-player

The Last Ninja is an action-adventure game developed and published by System 3 in 1987 for the Commodore 64. It was converted to the Apple IIGS, MS-DOS, BBC Micro and Acorn Electron in 1988, the Apple II in 1989, the Amiga and Atari ST (as Last Ninja Remix) in 1990, and the Acorn Archimedes in 1991.

It was followed by two sequels: Last Ninja 2 and Last Ninja 3.

== Plot ==
For centuries, the clan of the Fujiwara reigned Japan; they trained themselves in the ways of the Ninjutsu to be the best warriors.

The evil Shogun Kunitoki had long been envious of the ways of the Ninjutsu and yearned to discover the secrets of their magic powers, as documented in the sacred Koga Scrolls. Once in every decade the Ninjutsu met on the island of Lin-Fen, where they paid their last respects to the shrine of the "White Ninja", to get further fine-tuning.

Kunitoki devised a vicious plan to overpower the convened Ninjas and then began to instruct his own men in the Ninja martial arts with the stolen Koga Scrolls. But Kunitoki didn’t know that Armakuni had stayed at the shrine of the Bunkinkan during the battle, and therefore survived.

Armakuni, now the Last Ninja, heard of the happenings on Lin-Fen and immediately rushed to enact his revenge, retrieve the Koga scrolls and to restore the honour of the Ninjas.

== Gameplay ==
The Wilderness (Amiga)

The Last Ninja contains a blend of exploration, puzzle solving, and combat. The object of the game is to guide the ninja protagonist Armakuni on his journey to the palace of the evil shogun Kunitoki to assassinate him, avenge his clan, and retrieve the sacred scrolls. As the player progresses, Kunitoki's henchmen become more challenging as they learn the ways of the ninja.

The interface consists of the opponents' energy and collected inventory (on the right) and player's health (on the bottom). The world is viewed in an isometric perspective allowing the player to move in eight directions. Movements are relative to the direction Armakuni is facing but restricted to predefined paths upon inaccessible scenery. Precision must be used when navigating and jumping around obstacles, traps, and fatal features of the terrain. By approaching and kneeling at certain landmarks, such as shrines to Buddha and water fountains, an indication of what to collect next is revealed. These items are often hidden in trees or bushes and flash shortly after a new screen has been entered.

Attack moves are executed by combinations of directional controls with the fire button for attacking the opponent's head, torso and legs. Weapons, like the ninjato, nunchaku, staff, shuriken, and smoke bombs, can be equipped.

== Development ==
The program was originally developed for System 3 in Hungary for almost a year by a team called SoftView (an internal development team of Novotrade Software) but the financial advance for the work was refunded and the Hungarian team was uncredited for its work. SoftView developed it in its proprietary Forth-like language as a foundation for portability. A lot of time was spent developing the programming language and game engine. The team had some of the levels done, but missed all the deadlines, so the code was returned to London by Cale, and the engine rewritten for the Commodore 64 by John Twiddy.

Cale said: "Basically, the whole idea – the whole concept – was mine. The vision of The Last Ninja as an isometric adventure was something I was very passionate about. Obviously, the machines back then weren't powerful enough to create fully 3D games, so an isometric viewpoint seemed to be the right solution to move away from the standard side-scrolling platform games. We wanted to do something a bit different, something that would really capture the imagination. And there really is no better subject matter than the idea of controlling a ninja, a spiritual warrior. We wanted to combine an arcade experience with adventure elements. So it wasn't like Double Dragon, where you just go punch, kick, move, punch, kick, move… The whole idea was to solve a series of simple but realistic adventure puzzles. What we were essentially trying to do was take the square cursor blob from Adventure on the Atari 2600 and turn it into a fully interactive 3D adventure".

== Ports ==
Versions subsequent to the Commodore 64 original were published by Activision in 1987 for Apple IIGS and in 1988 for the Atari ST and MS-DOS. Superior Software published conversions for the BBC Micro, Acorn Electron in 1988, and Acorn Archimedes in 1992. The Amstrad CPC and ZX Spectrum versions were in production but were never released. It was re-released on Wii Virtual Console in Europe in April 2008 as the fifth Virtual Console Commodore 64 game, and in North America in February 2009 as one of the first three Virtual Console Commodore 64 games.

== Reception ==
Reception

Review scores
Publication	Score
Dragon	3/5
Commodore User	9/10
Zzap!64	94%
Datormagazin	4/5
.info	4/5
Electron User	9/10
CU Amiga	85%
Amiga Format	78%
Amiga User International	81%
Amiga Force	71%

Computer Gaming World stated that "there is no exaggerating the graphic excellence of" The Last Ninja. It was very successful as an original Commodore 64 game. In Europe, its sales alone were in excess of 750,000 units and international multi-format sales exceeded 2,000,000 units. According to System 3's Mark Cale, about 4 million copies of the game were sold in all. It was the best-selling C64 game at the time.

The game won many awards and was universally critically acclaimed as original and ground-breaking. It was a runner up for Game of the Year at the Golden Joystick Awards '88. According to UGO: "For a 20+ year old game, The Last Ninja is surprisingly advanced, sporting a combat system which allows specific body parts to be targeted, environmental obstacles, multiple weapons and hidden items galore".
