= Last Ninja =

Series of video games

- C64 cover for Last Ninja Remix
- Genre(s): Action-adventure
- Developer(s): System 3

Last Ninja is a series of video games published by System 3. The first game in the series titled The Last Ninja, was released in 1987 for the Commodore 64 and was one of the most successful games for the system. In 1988, System 3 released Last Ninja 2, and in 1991 the third game in the series, Last Ninja 3. In 1990, Last Ninja Remix was released for 8-bit systems. This was Last Ninja 2 with new music, a new introductory sequence, slightly changed graphics (most notably the screen border) and fixed bugs. Confusingly, the 16-bit versions of the original The Last Ninja game were also released in 1990 as Ninja Remix.

== Plot ==
The protagonist of The Last Ninja series is Armakuni, the sole survivor of a ninjutsu clan that was destroyed by an evil shogun named Kunitoki. This struggle leads Armakuni to the island of Lin Fen (in the first Last Ninja) to modern-day New York City (in Last Ninja 2) and to the mystical Buddhist temple in Tibet (in Last Ninja 3). In each of the games, Kunitoki is the final adversary and every time eludes death after a somewhat decisive victory from Armakuni.

== Gameplay ==
Each game is divided into a number of self-contained locations, with the original game containing six such 'levels'. Each level is loaded separately, in sequence as the game progresses. The game overtakes the player back to the start of the current level. Each location was presented as a map of static isometric screens, with the player's character restricted to predefined paths (the scenery was inaccessible). By 8-bit standards, the graphics were very detailed, and on many platforms, the screen would take a second or so to draw itself when entered.

The gameplay generally consisted of fighting, exploration, and puzzle-solving. Movement and fighting were done on the joystick, and the keyboard was used to select items and weapons that the player had to acquire. The player could select one active weapon and one item at any given time. Many map screens contained opponents which the ninja could avoid (by exiting a screen before they caught him) or fight using his selected weapon (in later Last Ninja games defeated enemies would revive after a certain amount of time). Items would flash briefly when a screen was first entered and could be picked up when standing close to them, usually triggering a crouching animation that was also often employed when using the object. Most of the puzzles were of the item-finding or precision-jumping variety.

== Games ==
- The Last Ninja: Commodore 64 (1987), MS-DOS (1988), Acorn Electron (1988), BBC Micro (1988), Apple IIGS (1988), Apple II (1989), Acorn Archimedes (1992), Virtual Console (2008)
- Ninja Remix: Amiga (1990), Atari ST (1990)
- Last Ninja 2: Commodore 64 (1988), ZX Spectrum (1988), Amstrad CPC (1988), Acorn Electron (1989), BBC Micro (1989), Amiga (1990), Atari ST (1990), MS-DOS (1990), NES (1990, as The Last Ninja), Virtual Console (2008)
- Last Ninja Remix: Commodore 64 (1990), ZX Spectrum (1990), Amstrad CPC (1990)
- Last Ninja 3: Commodore 64 (1991), Amiga (1991), Atari ST (1991), Amiga CD32 (1993), Virtual Console (2008)
- Last Ninja 4: C64 (cancelled)
- Last Ninja: IBM PC compatibles and possibly PlayStation (cancelled)
- Last Ninja: The Return/The Last Ninja – Return to Lin Fen Island: PlayStation 2, Xbox and GameCube (cancelled)

Generally the games had been made with Commodore 64 as the lead platform, with other platforms getting less attention (sometimes the porters didn't even receive the C64 version's data, and had to reconstruct the entire game from scratch). Versions of The Last Ninja for the BBC Micro, Acorn Electron and Acorn Archimedes/RISC OS computers were published by Superior Software, while Activision published it for the Apple IIGS.

One novel feature on the C64 version was the use of very distinctive oriental music in loading and in-game music for each level. These original music pieces on the first Last Ninja were composed by C64 musician Ben Daglish doing five tunes and Anthony Lees doing six tunes. In the sequel, Last Ninja 2, Matt Gray composed all the tunes. What separated The Last Ninja series from most other games was that in C64 version all three SID sound channels were dedicated to music playback, meaning that there were no in-game sounds. Reyn Ouwehand provided the new music used in the C64 version of Last Ninja Remix.

=== Last Ninja 4 ===
In 1993, John Wells created a series of previews, music and a map for one level of a fourth game which he tried to convince System 3 to make. System 3 turned him down.

Originally set for an early 2004 release, a new Last Ninja game was shown at the E3 2003 Expo in Los Angeles, but has since been delayed. Released screenshots showed a game looking very similar to Tecmo's Ninja Gaiden, also in development at the time (released in early 2004). Retro Gamer reported they "that Play It is to release the original Last Ninja trilogy on PS2. The graphics will be enhanced, but the gameplay and puzzles will remain intact. Again, this will be released in the next few months and priced at a very economical £10. It will also serve as a perfect appetiser for the fully 3D'd up Last Ninja 4, due out next year". A new game has also been said to be cancelled at least three times, only to return to development. In 2007, System 3 CEO, Mark Cale, said the fourth Last Ninja was scrapped because it "simply wasn't good enough" and stated that Last Ninja would be returning in the form of a remade trilogy for Nintendo DS and Wii. Cale said: "We've scrapped the fourth game. I felt it wasn't representative of the market. For Last Ninja 4, I think you need to do something that recreates that kind of 'wow' factor of the original game, and in my mind it wasn't good enough to wear that badge – so why cash in on a great name? We may as well leave it as it is. There will definitely be a fourth game. It'll either be a retro version with updated graphics but the same gameplay, or something that's going to be an epic, like a Final Fantasy game but with a more arcade feel". No news of the game have been made and the project appears to be shelved.

== Reception ==
In 2010, GamePro included Armakuni in their article "Top Ten video game ninjas". Virgin Media included him on the list of top ten video game ninja heroes, but commenting the series itself "hasn't aged all that gracefully".
