= Kirby Air Riders =

2025 video game

- Developers: Bandai Namco Studios; Sora Ltd.
- Publisher: Nintendo
- Director: Masahiro Sakurai
- Producers: Shinya Saito; Makoto Okazaki
- Designers: Masashi Kubo; Takeshi Azuma; Takanori Ikezawa
- Programmers: Takashi Nakagawa; Masakazu Yorifuji
- Artists: Tadashi Sato; Kota Ochiai; Masafumi Takagi
- Composers: Noriyuki Iwadare; Shogo Sakai; Akira Miyagawa
- Series: Kirby
- Platform: Nintendo Switch 2
- Release: November 20, 2025
- Genre: Kart racing
- Modes: Single-player, multiplayer

Kirby Air Riders (Note: Known in Japan as Kirby's Air Riders (カービィのエアライダー, Kābī no Ea Raidā)) is a 2025 kart racing game developed by Bandai Namco Studios and Sora Ltd. and published by Nintendo for the Nintendo Switch 2. Players control Kirby characters in four game modes including racing, traversal, and combat. Kirby Air Riders includes all modes from its GameCube predecessor Kirby Air Ride (2003), with additional characters, vehicles, customization options, and features, including a single-player story mode and online multiplayer.

Air Riders was the first Kirby game directed by the franchise's creator Masahiro Sakurai since Kirby Air Ride. Nintendo EPD and HAL Laboratory pitched him the concept in 2021, and production commenced in early 2022 after Super Smash Bros. Ultimate (2018) concluded development of its downloadable content. Shogo Sakai and Noriyuki Iwadare, who worked with Sakurai on the Super Smash Bros. series and Kid Icarus: Uprising (2012), composed the soundtrack. The music was composed with a live orchestra, and included multiple vocal performances for the game's main theme song. Sakurai supervised many parts of the development process, including the music composition, course design, story, and game balancing.

Nintendo announced Kirby Air Riders in April 2025, and promoted it with Nintendo Direct presentations, Nintendo Music releases, and demos for Nintendo Switch Online subscribers. During demo events, comparisons were made between the game and Nintendo EPD's racing launch title Mario Kart World (2025), and the character Rick gained popularity among Kirby fans. Amiibo figures based on characters and machines featured in the game were also released. Kirby Air Riders was released worldwide on November 20, 2025, being supported by post-launch updates and online events. Kirby Air Riders received generally positive reviews, with praise for its gameplay, presentation, customization, music, and mechanical depth, though the game modes drew mixed responses. It has since become one of the best-selling Nintendo Switch 2 games.

== Gameplay ==
Gameplay screenshot of the "Air Ride" mode, featuring Kirby, Magolor, Gooey, Waddle Doo, and Knuckle Joe racing in the ocean-themed track "Waveflow Waters"

Kirby Air Riders, similar to its predecessor Kirby Air Ride, is a racing video game featuring simplified controls where players focus on steering, boosting, and utilizing the series' signature ability to absorb enemies' powers. Unlike Air Ride, which only featured Kirby and the Air Ride Machine equivalents King Dedede and Meta Knight as playable characters, Air Riders features 21 playable characters (Riders), all of which can use Copy Abilities, and each rider has a unique "Special" ability. Kirby has four Special abilities, with the one used depending on the color of Kirby selected. In addition to choosing a character, Air Riders features 22 machines to choose from, each one having different stats. The Air Ride, City Trial, and Top Ride modes from Air Ride return, all of which are expanded in both size and depth, and feature both online and local multiplayer. Additionally, Air Ride adds a relay race allowing players to swap their vehicle after every lap, and City Trial allows players to partake in team battles. Air Ride races can have up to 6 players, Top Ride supports up to 8 players, and City Trial allows up to 16 players simultaneously.

Machines in the game move forward automatically without player input, with players simply steering and maintaining balance. Players can also brake, boost, and perform drift maneuvers with the B button and perform special moves and switch machines with the Y button. Moving the control stick side-to-side allows the player to perform a spin attack, which can damage their opponents. By attacking other characters, players can fill up a "Special Gauge", which, when full, allows them to use their "Special" ability. New gameplay mechanics allow the player to increase their speed. Attacking enemies and performing perfect landings creates a speed boost, and following the trail of stars behind opponents can help the player catch up to them. Air Ride mode is a racing game where players complete a set amount of laps and reach the end as fast as possible. Air Ride features 18 race tracks, including all 9 tracks from the previous game. City Trial is set on a large map, Skyah, where players collect stats, obtain new machines, and battle opponents before they compete in a Stadium event to determine the winner. Skyah features many areas for players to explore, including secret floating islands away from the central map. During City Trial matches, random field events can earn players power-ups based on their performance. Four legendary machines can also be acquired by assembling all three of their parts, with the two new machines being Gigantes and Leo, which are unlocked after completing the story in Road Trip. At the end of a City Trial game, players vote on one of four Stadium events to compete in. All Stadium events return from Kirby Air Ride (with the exception of VS. King Dedede, which was replaced with VS. Boss). New events have also been added, including the Gourmet Race from Kirby Super Star (1996). In Stadium VS. boss events, all players attempt to defeat one of four bosses, either being Marx, Nightmare, Robo Dedede, or Zero Two. Road Trip is a mode exclusive to Kirby Air Riders, which features the game's story. To become one with their vehicles, the Riders play challenges or minigames relating to the existing game modes, and are assisted by characters from previous Kirby games to progress through different routes. The player collects stats, machines, and Road Miles as currency to purchase more useful items. At the end of the mode, the player battles against Gigantes, and upon playing the mode in New Game+, battles against Galactic Nova as the true final boss.

Miles are a form of in-game currency that can be earned by playing the game and are spent in the shop. They can be used to unlock customization options such as cosmetics for their characters and vehicles. In the My Machines menu, vehicles can be fully customized with items purchased by the player, which can be listed online for sale on the Machine Market. Gummies shaped after machines are supplementary collectables earned during general gameplay and have no monetary value, which can be viewed and interacted with in a dedicated menu. While online, players can roam around the Paddock, a lobby where they can interact with other online users before matches. The player's performance in online matches determines their Global Win Power, a ranking system which is displayed on their license. This license can be customized further with stickers and special effects. Five Kirby Air Riders Amiibo figures can be scanned into the game and trained as a "Figure Player". There are 150 challenges on the checklist to complete for each game mode, with 750 total achievements. These challenges can unlock many collectible items and reveal a large mural on a 10 by 15 grid, with the player able to attempt challenges right from the checklist menu.

After a day one update, "Daily Air Ride" and "Limited Time Events" were added, allowing online players to race on a daily rotation of Air Ride courses and race under special rules during events respectively. These events are planned to be hosted until one year after the release of the game. A later update added a new mode to Air Ride, Grand Prix, which has players compete in races one after the other, declaring a winner based on their overall score.

== Plot ==
Zorah, a sentient machine, crash lands on Planet Popstar, where it is stuck immobile for ages. Zorah's wish to be able to move is eventually picked up by the Fountain of Dreams and granted by the orbiting satellite Galactic Nova. Galactic Nova begins to create Air Ride machines based on Zorah's design, and deploys them to Popstar in dormant form. Individuals who could awaken and harness the machines by sharing their will become known as "riders", and machines eventually become fully integrated into society. Meanwhile, Galactic Nova brutally remakes Zorah into the machine Gigantes, which, if activated by a strong-willed rider, will destroy the planet. Galactic Nova, through Gigantes, sends a signal to these strong-willed riders and their machines to start their journey to Gigantes. Noir Dedede, a sentient rider and machine formed from a piece of Zorah's will before being transformed, attempts to stop riders—and the player—from reaching Gigantes.

The player manages to reach Gigantes, who activates after sensing their approach. The player manages to weaken Gigantes in the ensuing battle, before engaging in a final race with Noir Dedede to reach the machine's core. If the player loses against Noir Dedede, Gigantes will self destruct, but if the player wins against Noir Dedede, they pierce through Gigantes, neutralizing it. With its equivalent of a heart now gone, Noir Dedede withers, while Galactic Nova flies away from Planet Popstar.

If all twenty-two machines in the game's Road Trip mode are collected in the "New Game+" mode, the true ending is initiated. Gigantes attacks the player and absorbs all of their machines, upgrading itself into Hyper Gigantes. Noir Dedede summons the Legendary Machines Hydra and Dragoon to fight alongside the player. After the powered-up Gigantes is defeated, Noir Dedede then fuses itself with Zorah's core and takes control of Hyper Gigantes to create a road for the player to reach Galactic Nova. A third Legendary Machine, Leo, appears before the player to lead them to Galactic Nova. The player defeats Galactic Nova, which explodes. With Zorah's original core still intact, the machines manage to reassemble Zorah's original form, now allowing it to freely depart into the cosmos.

== Development ==
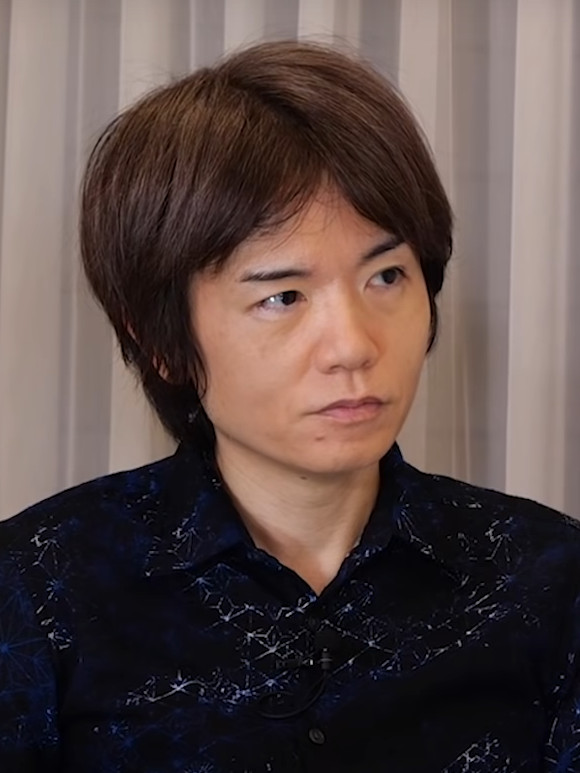
Kirby's creator and director of Kirby Air Ride, Masahiro Sakurai (pictured), returned for the sequel.

Kirby Air Riders was directed by Masahiro Sakurai, creator of the Kirby series, developed by Bandai Namco Studios and Sora Ltd. This was the first time Sakurai directed a Kirby title since Kirby Air Ride in 2003, with his last role in the series prior to Kirby Air Riders being a "Special Advisor" for Kirby & the Amazing Mirror in 2004. According to Sakurai, pre-production started in 2021 when the idea was proposed by Nintendo EPD executive general manager Shinya Takahashi and HAL Laboratory president Satoshi Mitsuhara, with full production starting in April 2022. It was the first game to be developed with the SOL-AVES engine created by Bandai Namco Studios, which had been in development since 2019. Kirby Air Riders was produced by Shinya Saito and Makoto Okazaki, with programming management by Takashi Nakagawa and Masakazu Yorifuji.

Before development began, Sakurai designed a realistic 3D model for one of the machines, Wheelie Bike, which would serve as the basis for the game's realistic art direction. When designing the Air Ride courses, twenty themes were created, eventually being reduced to ones that were most distinct from each other. Two teams were in charge of the visuals and design of each course. The design team would create the two-dimensional layout, have the course be refined further by Sakurai, and make final adjustments, using colors to represent visual elements. Each Air Ride course was designed to be similar to a ride at an amusement park, incorporating elements of action games. To enhance the visibility of corners where players could take turns, lights were added to courses to better communicate a proper depth of field. The courses for Air Ride were planned to be shorter than the previous entry, but their expansion during development allowed for more variety in their design. The machines were created for Air Ride first before being adjusted for use in Top Ride.

Originally, the design team planned to port the City Trial map from Kirby Air Ride, but stuck with Skyah as the only City Trial map to save costs, better account for the stat differences of each machine, and have a map large enough for sixteen players. Sakurai also considered it "impossible to have variations of the fields" for this reason. A separate development team was assigned with creating field events for City Trial, which Sakurai considered to be "significantly improved" from their appearances in Kirby Air Ride. Additionally, the decision was made to choose between one of four possible Stadium events. Sakurai felt having sixteen players competing in the same event may be overwhelming, and he also felt it was a good solution to prevent others from being discouraged when competing against more experienced players in online matches.

To allow players to choose from other characters besides Kirby, his signature Copy Ability was applied to the entire roster, along with each character having distinct attributes based on their designs. While Sakurai stated there were more enemies to choose from in the Kirby universe, a few major characters were also added, with Noir Dedede being the only original playable character. Character animations took "an incredible amount of work", with each character having animations used in the Paddock, the online waiting room. Before finalizing on a number of machine types, new machines were conceptualized, including the "Runner", which was described as "a type that runs with chicken legs", but was ultimately scrapped. New Copy Abilities were added to the game, but the Wing Copy Ability, allowing the player to fly, was not brought back from Kirby Air Ride. Sakurai stated the decision was made so flying animations did not have to be created for each character, as opposed to the Drill Copy Ability, where distinct character animations were not needed since they would be buried underground.

Concept artwork for Zorah, a sentient being formed from "machines, minerals, and meteorites"

To add more single-player content, Road Trip was created, giving players "a series of challenges" to complete. The plot for the Road Trip mode, along with the character names for Zorah and Gigantes, were conceptualized by Sakurai. The story was made to revolve around the machines, as since the player would be able to select their Rider, it was seen as more challenging to make the story player-centric. The machines Zorah, Gigantes, and Nova, with Nova first introduced in Kirby Super Star, were also made to be key to the story. Route characters that assist the player during Road Trip were selected to create a "sense of unpredictability" and link between the different stages. Characters from previous Kirby games were used, representing a wide range of titles from the series' history.

Sakurai expressed interest in making the game accessible during its early stages of development. Testers gave feedback on the visual effects and screen positioning, and although the speed and default camera angle were not changed for the final release, settings were added to adjust visual elements. Customization options for the license, machines, as well as headwear for characters to fulfill the desires of some players, even if others would not see additional value in customization. A minor aspect of the game, that being the player's number of victories, was expanded into its own visual menu titled "Gummies". They were meant to serve as a "tangible sense of achievement" for the player, with gummy candy being chosen particularly for their simplicity and the Kirby series' thematic relation to food.

=== Music ===
The soundtrack was composed by Shogo Sakai and Noriyuki Iwadare. Iwadare also worked on the Super Smash Bros. series and Kid Icarus: Uprising (2012), while Sakai was the co-composer of Kirby Air Ride. Sakurai requested their involvement due to their proficiency with composing and conducting orchestras, desiring an orchestrated soundtrack as opposed to other common racing game musical styles such as "Eurobeat and fusion". The title of the project was initially kept secret from the composers, although Sakai correctly assumed it was a sequel to Kirby Air Ride when Sakurai attempted to contact him. Sakurai mentioned that the most important fundamental musical concept was that "children had to be able to sing along", with his first specific request being to create "a signature melody" that would differentiate its soundtrack from ambient music present in other video games. The Air Ride courses were divided evenly among the two composers, with Sakurai giving input on their compositions. Various members of Bandai Namco's internal sound team, such as Rio Hamamoto, also contributed music to the game. Akira Miyagawa, who previously worked on the score for the Japanese version of Kirby: Right Back at Ya! (with many songs being carried over into the original Kirby Air Ride and brought back for Air Riders), was also formally credited for music after only receiving a "Special Thanks" credit in the original game.

In comparison to other works by Sakurai such as the Super Smash Bros. series, he was able to directly communicate with the composers and contribute to the creation of the game's soundtrack. The song for Waveflow Waters was envisioned to be different from Latin music and tropical music, as Sakurai requested it to be more akin to hard rock, although Iwadare's initial composition was described as too Latin-inspired, with Iwadare admitting he did not listen to the music samples sent to him as reference. For Cavernous Corners, the piece was inspired by indigenous tribes. Three versions of an improvised flute solo were recorded, leading to Sakurai selecting the recording which was "the least polished" to best represent tribespeople and their spontaneity. Three alternative songs for Airtopia Ruins were scrapped for being too lighthearted, whereas the course was meant to depict a fallen kingdom, leading to the final composition becoming more somber in nature. Other courses like the techno-themed Cyberion Highway were planned to have English vocals, but unlike the use of a backing chorus, Sakurai believed their addition would be too distracting and ultimately scrapped them. The theme for the Galactic Nova Air Ride course went through the most revisions of any song in Kirby Air Riders, with Galactic Nova's interior being an arrangement of VS. Marx from Kirby Super Star.

The main theme for Kirby Air Riders, "Starlit Journey", was composed by Noriyuki Iwadare. The Japanese vocals were performed by YuReeNa, and the English vocals were performed by MJ Cube. For the ending themes "Starlit Journey: Ballad" and "Starlit Journey: Free", the vocals were performed by Sayo, with the song set in a lower key due to it originally being planned for a male vocalist. Early plans included the use Vocaloid software for the vocal performances, but were scrapped for either sounding "too robotic or too human". Iwadare stated that the main theme was the only song to receive immediate approval from Sakurai after its creation. Three songs were presented to Sakurai, with the third song becoming the main theme and the second becoming the music used for the ending. The lyrics were written by Sakurai to represent two sides of the game's story, both conveying the joy of the riders uniting with the machines and Zorah's wish to gain sentience and freedom. During the vocal recording for the ending theme, Sakurai stated that it "might be my favorite ending out of all of the games I've made so far". Two live recording sessions occurred in February and May of 2025, with over fifty songs being recorded. Music from the previous game and additional songs from the Super Smash Bros. series are also included, with the "My Music" feature returning as it appears in the series.

== Release and promotion ==
Masahiro Sakurai first teased the game in October 2024 on his YouTube channel, Masahiro Sakurai on Creating Games, as a top secret project that he had been developing after the completion of said YouTube series and development of downloadable content for Super Smash Bros. Ultimate. Kirby Air Riders was officially announced during a Nintendo Direct presentation focused on the Nintendo Switch 2 on April 2, 2025. Sakurai was revealed to be serving as its director, with his team at Bandai Namco Studios and Sora Ltd. developing. A 45-minute long Nintendo Direct hosted by Sakurai about Kirby Air Riders aired on August 19, 2025. It revealed the first gameplay footage, new playable characters, and ended by announcing the game's release date. Seven music tracks from the game were added to the Nintendo Music app the same day. A second, hour-long Nintendo Direct about the game aired on October 23, 2025, with Sakurai once again hosting. It revealed online features, additional new playable characters, returning race tracks, other new modes and features, vehicle customizations, a music player, a story mode, and ended by announcing a live demo. Additional tracks from the game were added to the Nintendo Music app the same day. At the end of the Direct, Sakurai stated that he does not plan to add any DLC or create a follow-up to Kirby Air Riders. He claimed that "the passionate support from fans was a big reason why this game was made", and has no plans for the series after its release since he's "thrown everything [he has] into this game from the start". The "Global Test Ride" was a live demo held between November 8–9 and 15–16, respectively, for Nintendo Switch Online members to test the game before the final release. It featured the Lessons, Air Ride, and City Trial modes, with each of the two weeks containing a different selection of riders and machines.

Amiibo figures containing one character and machine bundled together are set to be released over time, with five being revealed before the release of Kirby Air Riders. They have swappable bases, allowing riders to be removed from their machines and swapped onto another figure. Once scanned into the game, the rider and corresponding machine can be trained as a "Figure Player". Two Amiibo figures, "Kirby & Warp Star" and "Bandana Waddle Dee & Winged Star" launched alongside the game's release. On March 5, 2026, the "Meta Knight & Shadow Star" Amiibo released. "Dedede & Tank Star" was released on July 2, 2026. On March 5, 2026, two additional figures were revealed in Japan, these being "Sword Kirby & Dragoon" and "Noir Dedede & Hydra". The figures are the most expensive amiibo Nintendo has released to date.

Advertising for the game was featured on trams by Yarra Trams in Melbourne, Australia starting November 5, 2025. Readers of Famitsu magazine ranked it as their most anticipated game the week of its release, and Kirby Air Riders was featured on the cover of the Weekly Famitsu the day of its release. Prior to its release, an advertisement for the game titled "What's that? Huh?" received mixed reception. Critics have compared it both favorably and unfavorably to the DK Rap from Donkey Kong 64 (1999), with Metro's Adam Starkey claiming it to be "the worst song in the company's history" and "fascinatingly bad". Scott McCrae of GameRadar+ described it as "cheesy", "bizarre", and "hilariously unfitting to Kirby Air Riders' vibe", but claimed to enjoy it regardless. Kirby Air Riders was featured as the theme for the 50th Maximus Cup in Tetris 99.

Increased moderation on the Machine Marketplace occurred as soon as the game released, caused by multiple custom vehicles depicting the character Chef Kawasaki in a micro bikini, which subsequently became the most popular and expensive items in the online shop. This was a reference to a meme in the Japanese Kirby fandom, and similar to a fan-made card game that was based on this concept, these machines were also taken down by Nintendo. On December 11, 2025, Masahiro Sakurai announced that the development team would soon be disbanding, and would only plan to balance the game one more time. The same day, an update was released that tweaked the stats for some vehicles, with Rick being the only rider that received major changes. On January 26, 2026, the game was updated to support GameShare, along with adding the Grand Prix mode online and supporting two players joining online matches on a single system.

== Reception ==
=== Pre-release ===
On August 19, 2025, a media-exclusive demo was available at Gamescom, in which the media outlets were shown the Nintendo Direct as it aired the same day and granted early access to the game. A preview event was also hosted in New York City on the same day. After playing the demo, Nintendo Life author Felix Sanchez believed that "Kirby Air Riders is shaping up to be really great", but he "worried that City Trial will get old". After playing the same demo, Leanne Butkovic of IGN heavily praised the game, stating "[t]he maximalism of Kirby Air Riders is its core charm; it feels brewed from impish, chaotic-neutral alchemy." Other media outlets complimented the Air Ride and City Trial modes, while Video Games Chronicle writer Chris Scullion felt he needed more time to determine whether City Trial becomes repetitive.

Many critics compared the gameplay to Mario Kart World, a launch game for the Nintendo Switch 2 that shared the racing game genre. Alex Perry of Mashable claimed the game "makes Mario Kart World look sedate by comparison". James Daly of GamesRadar+ suggested the title is more of an alternative to the Mario Kart series for players who desire something "far more chaotic". Rhys Wood of TechRadar similarly claimed the game is a "casual-friendly alternative" to Mario Kart World, with the assumption that they may prefer Kirby Air Riders for being a more "refreshing" experience. Polygon writer Giovanni Colantonio noted that the cult following Kirby Air Ride gained over the years propelled the popularity and anticipation for its sequel, but was unsure if the game would stand out compared to Mario Kart World, since Kirby Air Ride was "critically panned" and overshadowed by both F-Zero GX and Mario Kart: Double Dash!! in 2003.

During the Global Test Ride, Rick—a hamster-like character that debuted in Kirby's Dream Land 2 (1995)—became popular among fans of the game for his surprising top speed and humorous special ability "Rip-Roaring Rick". Carlos Zotomayor of Automaton West claimed that Rick flooded online lobbies of the game for "his adorable design and animations make him appealing to more casual players", comparing him favorably to the Cows in the Mario Kart series. Patricia Hernandez of Polygon compared Rick's speed to the fast-paced hectic gameplay in City Trial stating "it could be coming from the perspective of a hyperactive hamster", and how this likely caused the character to become a meme among the Kirby fandom. During the second weekend of the Global Test Ride, players felt that the game's pace was slower than during the first one.

=== Critical reception ===
Reception

Aggregate scores
Aggregator	Score
Metacritic	79/100 (Note: Score based on 115 reviews)
OpenCritic	87% recommend (Note: Score based on 107 reviews)

Review scores
Publication	Score
Eurogamer	4/5
Famitsu	8/10, 9/10, 10/10, 9/10 (Note: Each of the four reviewers in Famitsu scored the game on a ten-point scale.)
Game Informer	8.5/10
Gamekult	7/10
GameSpot	8/10
GamesRadar+	4/5
IGN	8/10
Jeuxvideo.com	14/20
Nintendo Life	8/10
PC Games (DE)	7.5/10
Shacknews	8/10
TechRadar	4/5
Video Games Chronicle	4/5
Siliconera	10/10

Kirby Air Riders received generally favorable reviews according to the review aggregator website Metacritic. Review aggregator OpenCritic assessed that the game received a strong approval rating from critics. The presentation of Kirby Air Riders received universal praise, particularly for its music, visuals, and breadth of content for both the variety of unlockables and customization features. It is often considered more than just a racing game, combining multiple different genres such as fighting games, party games, and roguelikes. In their summary, Harry Padoan of TechRadar described Kirby Air Riders as "a combination of Mario Kart and Super Smash Bros. at their most chaotic".

The game is considered an overall improvement from its predecessor for refining old game modes and introducing new mechanics, with many components of Kirby Air Ride returning. GameSpot writer Jake Dekker described it as the initial concept from the first game "taken as far as it could possibly go", with Siliconera writer Jenni Lada considering it "a perfect follow-up to the GameCube original". Jeuxvideo.com writer Charlan stated that, despite being an improvement, the game has not fundamentally changed much from the original. Conversely, Logan Plant of IGN called it "a significant leap forward", as if Super Smash Bros. on the Nintendo 64 was followed by Super Smash Bros. Ultimate.

Many critics stated that while the gameplay is seemingly simple since it primarily uses one button, it also has significant depth to it. Controls were regarded as extremely simple and easy to learn, but mastery of the game proved to be difficult for some. PJ O'Reilly of Nintendo Life informed players of a potential learning curve for the game, while DocSavage of Gamekult cited specific mechanics such as perfect landings requiring precise timing and practice. Along with mastering the game, other outlets believed the gameplay can be initially confusing for newcomers, as it plays distinctly differently from other racing video games. Alex Donaldson of Eurogamer thought the single-button controls "can be a little baffling", expecting some new players to not like the game as much initially. Despite praising the mechanical depth, some critics desired another button input, believing the control scheme was needlessly restrictive. IGN's Logan Plant wrote that the controls are "sometimes too simplistic for its own good", with the game running into problems caused by "its own self-imposed limitations". Some reviewers were divided on the speed of Kirby Air Riders. Jake Dekker of GameSpot stated how it "border[s] on being overstimulating", forcing the player to frequently make quick decisions and making the Air Ride mode "deeply satisfying". In contrast, DocSavage of Gamekult claimed one of the main problems is the speed disrupting the visual clarity, stating how the player will almost certainly crash repeatedly if they do not memorize the tracks. Overall, the fast, frantic gameplay has been described to provide a rush of dopamine to the player. Critics appreciated the variety of unique machines to select from. DocSavage described how they "drastically change the approach to each race" allowing for "a fun and varied experience". Dekker claimed "those stark differences give so much character to the vehicle lineup", with Plant adding that the machines "all still seem viable in some way". The addition of more playable characters with unique special moves was similarly complimented for introducing variety to the roster. Harry Padoan of TechRadar stated the roster contained a "fun set of riders from right across the series' rich history", including color variations, despite the "limitations of a Kirby-only cast". Chris Scullion of Video Games Chronicle wrote that the characters were "somewhat less diverse in terms of stats", but still offered differences with their special moves.

The main four game modes received mixed opinions. Air Ride was generally complimented, with Gamekult writer DocSavage describing it as the most satisfying and enduring mode in the game. Logan Plant of IGN claimed it had "incredible track design", complimented by the game's presentation, while PJ O'Reilly of Nintendo Life summarized it as "manic in all the right ways". In comparison, Harry Padoan of TechRadar described Air Ride as a "visual spectacle", but desired a slightly larger course selection. Plant also appreciated the returning tracks from the first game, but noted their simplicity in comparison to the newer courses. City Trial received generally mixed reviews, with Chris Scullion of Video Games Chronicle describing City Trial as "more of an acquired taste". In their summary of City Trial, GameSpot's Jake Dekker claimed it to be unique, random, somewhat unbalanced, and "chaotic in the best way possible". Eurogamer, Gamekult, and IGN claimed the mode to be enjoyable, with Plant considering it a highlight of the package. Conversely, Donovan Erskine of Shacknews stated City Trial lacks the excitement of other modes and "gets old pretty fast", stating it is a "weak link". Charlan of Jeuxvideo.com claimed the gameplay loop is not varied enough, while Padoan claimed their character can quickly become "totally out of control", being a mode best enjoyed in bursts. Plant shares this opinion, stating while it is a fun party mode, the game can sometimes become "too hectic" and "overwhelming". DocSavage also described the mode as repetitive due to the lack of variety in the final challenges and the lack of additional maps. Many critics disliked the Stadium events, claiming them to be an anticlimactic end to the mode. Top Ride received similarly mixed reviews, with Eurogamer and Gamekult comparing the mode to the likes of Micro Machines. Alex Donaldson of Eurogamer loved the mode for its "nostalgic-tickling mechanical purity", O'Reilly claimed Top Ride to be "addictive as all hell", and Dekker called the mode a fun yet straightforward distraction. In contrast, DocSavage described Top Ride as an afterthought, providing an "unengaging challenge" with "sometimes unstable controls", while Plant considered it the weakest part of the game. Road Trip was met with somewhat positive reviews, with critics considering its story reminiscent of the Subspace Emissary campaign in Super Smash Bros. Brawl. In summary, DocSavage described Road Trip as "a kind of melting pot of everything the game has to offer". Some compared the mode to Out Run, with O'Reilly considering it as the main big addition to the game. Siliconera's Jenni Lada, Gamekult's DocSavage, and Nintendo Life's PJ O'Reilly claimed the mode is a great starting point for newcomers due to the mode's difficulty progression. Dekker described how the mode has a "satisfying sense of progression" to it, offering "a lot of replay value". The main critique of Road Trip was its length, either being too long to be replayable or too short to qualify as a story mode. Plant claimed the mode "stretch[ed] this control scheme past its limitations" with a heavy focus on combat challenges, which Plant believed was one of the weakest part of the controls. Critics complimented the story itself, with Plant describing it as "surprisingly epic", and Rollin Bishop of GamesRadar+ considering it to be "absolutely wild".

Although the game modes received various mixed opinions, the multiplayer was cited as a strength for many reviewers. Alex Donaldson of Eurogamer described Kirby Air Riders as a staple for "quick multiplayer shenanigans with friends", with Jake Dekker of GameSpot claiming it to be "Nintendo's slickest implementation of multiplayer to date" aside from Splatoon 3. In regard to City Trial, Jeuxvideo.com writer Charlan detailed how it is "very multiplayer-focused and will only truly shine when played with friends". PJ O'Reilly of Nintendo Life "couldn't be happier with the performance" when playing the online multiplayer, claiming their matches were "buttery smooth" for all modes.

Critics widely praised the amount of content, unlockables, collectables, and customization options, with the checklist providing substantial replay value. Alex Donaldson of Eurogamer described it as "an absolutely enormous abundance of challenges", with GameSpot writer Jake Dekker appreciating how they make every race feel worthwhile. The My Machines customization was regarded as "surprisingly in-depth", providing plenty of tools for players to create their own machines and display them online. The presentation was compared positively to the Super Smash Bros. series, with the menus, visual style, and unrivaled attention to detail demonstrating Masahiro Sakurai's design style. Many critics complimented the design of the user interface designed by Michiko Sakurai. TechRadar claimed the game was a "visual treat" with some excellent accessibility features providing a better user experience. Scott McCrae of GamesRadar+ praised the menu and UI, putting it as "a contender for the greatest menu of all time". A few days after release, IGN's Logan Plant ranked Kirby Air Riders among the top ten best Kirby games.

=== Sales ===
On November 16, 2025, it was reported that Kirby Air Riders pre-orders topped sales charts on the Nintendo eShop the week before its launch, and it debuted at the twelfth position on the physical UK sales charts. The game sold 195,594 physical copies and debuted No. 1 in the game sales charts in Japan during its first week according to Famitsu. During its second week, Kirby Air Riders failed to make it on the UK top 40 sales charts. According to Circana, Kirby Air Riders was the tenth best-selling video game in the United States during the month of November, despite physical sales achieving a record low in the country. As of March 31, 2026, the game has sold 1.87 million copies worldwide, making it the fifth best-selling Nintendo Switch 2 video game. Around the same time, sales reached approximately 490,000 physical copies in Japan, with the title remaining among the top ten best-selling games on the Famitsu sales charts.

=== Awards ===
The Academy of Interactive Arts & Sciences nominated Kirby Air Riders for Racing Game of the Year at the 29th Annual D.I.C.E. Awards. Kirby Air Riders won the Award for Excellence at the Japan Game Awards 2026.
