= Kirby Star Allies =

2018 video game

- Developer: HAL Laboratory
- Publisher: Nintendo
- Director: Shinya Kumazaki
- Producers: Tadashi Kamitake; Hitoshi Yamagami
- Designer: Kenichiro Kita
- Programmer: Keita Tanifuji
- Artist: Riki Fuhrmann
- Composers: Hirokazu Ando; Jun Ishikawa; Yuuta Ogasawara
- Series: Kirby
- Platform: Nintendo Switch
- Release: 16 March 2018
- Genre: Platform
- Modes: Single-player, multiplayer

Kirby Star Allies (Note: Known in Japan as Kirby of the Stars: Star Allies (星のカービィ スターアライズ, Hoshi no Kābi Sutā Araizu)) is a 2018 platform game developed by HAL Laboratory and published by Nintendo for the Nintendo Switch. It is the twelfth mainline installment in the Kirby series; the player controls Kirby in his quest to prevent a priest named Hyness from reviving a dark force to destroy the universe. Kirby must complete each level by jumping, inhaling enemies, and using his array of abilities to progress.

Development of the game began during the 25th anniversary of the Kirby series. The developers later added additional content for the game for the sake of adding more references from past games in the franchise. The game also features more emphasis on higher definition graphics by making the screen more spread out.

Star Allies initially received mixed reviews, with praise directed towards the game's graphics, mechanics and soundtrack, but criticism directed toward its lack of depth and low level of difficulty. However, general reception was later re-evaluated as positive after free additional content was later added, being praised for adding a new layer of difficulty. The game was a commercial success, selling 4.38 million copies as of 31 December 2022, making it one of the best-selling games on the Switch.

== Gameplay ==
Kirby (left) throwing a Friend Heart at Sir Kibble – an enemy that grants the Cutter ability

Kirby Star Allies is a 2.5D platform game played from a side-on perspective. Players control the series' titular protagonist Kirby, who can be accompanied by up to three companions. Kirby can throw hearts at enemies to turn them into allies. The game can be played alone with the game's AI controlling companions or cooperatively with other players controlling companions. When Kirby has companions, new special attacks become available which allow Kirby to combine his abilities with those of his allies', a feature introduced in Kirby: Super Star, and not seen since Kirby: Squeak Squad. The elemental fusions last for as long as the power is held or until a new element is introduced over it, while some of the combinations are single-use moves that bear more of a resemblance to the combinations found in Kirby 64: The Crystal Shards. When Kirby has three allies, they can perform "Friend Actions" on specific stages, like "Friend Train" and "Friend Star." Scattered throughout each level are stars which can grant Kirby an extra life if 100 are collected. Doors act as checkpoints where Kirby can respawn if he loses a life.

The game also introduces the "Dream Friend" system, which allows the player to call upon characters from past Kirby games as special allies with expanded movesets. Bandana Waddle Dee, King Dedede, and Meta Knight can all be unlocked as Dream Friends through progression in Story Mode. Additional Dream Friends have been added via software updates.

== Plot ==
On the Jambandra space station far away from Kirby's home Planet Popstar, a dark crystal heart explodes due to an imperfection in a mysterious ritual, sending its numerous fragments, Jamba Hearts, hurtling into deep space. Many characters, including King Dedede and Meta Knight, are possessed while investigating the dark hearts that land on Popstar. A pink heart hits Kirby, but it instead gives him the ability to befriend enemies by throwing hearts. Kirby notices many Waddle Dees bringing food to Castle Dedede and decides to investigate. After Kirby frees Meta Knight and King Dedede from the Jamba Heart's influence, a large fortress known as the Jambastion lands on Popstar. Kirby’s team of friends encounter and defeat the Three Mage-Sisters, a trio composed of Francisca, Flamberge, and Zan Partizanne. The mages arrived to retrieve the dark hearts on behalf of their leader, Hyness. Zan then triggers the self-destruction of the Jambastion, hoping to trap Kirby and his friends, but fails.

Kirby and his friends then chase the sisters throughout the far reaches of space to obtain the dark hearts before they do.

Kirby and his friends connect a path to Jambandra Base and breach its defensive barrier. They battle Zan once again before meeting Hyness, an evil cleric who is planning to summon the god of his religion, Void Termina, to full power using the Jamba Hearts. After being defeated, Hyness sacrifices the generals and himself to subsequently revive Void Termina. Kirby and his friends use a Friend Pedestal to summon the Friend Star, but it transforms into the Star Allies Sparkler via the power of the four Heart Spears that were stuck in the prison of Void Termina. After overcoming its humanoid body, also regurgitating Hyness and the Mage-Sisters in the process, and defeating its bird form, it is revealed that its true form is a purplish pink cluster with three dark eye-like spots that can arrange themselves to resemble Kirby's face. Kirby then destroys Void Termina with the Star Allies Sparkler, summoning friends in the process. The Sparkler is destroyed by the resulting explosion, but Kirby uses a Warp Star to return himself and his friends safely home.

Through a series of pause screens in various boss fights, it is explained that Void Termina is one of the many forms that a primordial being known as Void can take depending on what surrounds it at birth. Series director Shinya Kumazaki later clarified that Void Termina’s appearance in-game, such as its Kirby-like face, was influenced by both Hyness' and Kirby’s presence at its birth. A new difficulty setting named Soul Melter EX was added to the game’s boss endurance mode, The Ultimate Choice. In the new setting, Void is a boss. When defeated, it smiles, hoping that it will be reborn into a new, happier form.

== Development and release ==
Kirby Star Allies was developed by HAL Laboratory and published by Nintendo. The game is thought to be based upon the first incarnation of the cancelled Kirby game for the GameCube, the trailer for which shows Kirby making multiple helpers, akin to the fundamental element of Star Allies. Development of the game began during the 25th anniversary of the Kirby franchise. The game was initially teased under the tentative title Kirby during E3 2017. In September 2017, the game's official title was announced during a Nintendo Direct presentation. The game was released for the Nintendo Switch game console on 16 March 2018. On 3 March 2018, a free demo of the game was released on the Nintendo eShop showcasing two of the game's stages.

HAL Laboratory developer Shinya Kumazaki went over the world map concept, and the ability of creating more open, higher resolution imagery with the Nintendo Switch console. They swayed to making the screen more spread out in contrast to Kirby, as they could make Kirby smaller but still retain shape, while being able to present more of the background at one time. The more extended background helped the player from getting lost, as they could see more on screen at one time.

The idea for the downloadable content was to help give attention to past Kirby games, and the series as a whole. The developers, rather than focus on an existing narrative, wanted to create a new experience for the characters. Kumazaki noted how if they were to rather focus on an intricate story, it would ruin the fun of the adventure. When discussing the lack of other popular characters from the franchise, he said that there were certain characters he wanted to appear, such as Galacta Knight from Kirby Super Star Ultra. They created a development rule, where they would only select one character from each game to represent the main series.

Following the game's release, Super Kirby Clash and Kirby Fighters 2 were released, in 2019 and 2020 respectively, using the same engine.

== Reception ==
Reception

Aggregate scores
Aggregator	Score
Metacritic	73/100
OpenCritic	55% recommend

Review scores
Publication	Score
Destructoid	9/10
Edge	7/10
Electronic Gaming Monthly	9/10
Famitsu	35/40
Game Informer	6.25/10
GameSpot	8/10
IGN	8.3/10
Nintendo Life	7/10
Nintendo World Report	7/10
PCMag	4/5
Polygon	7/10
Shacknews	4/5
USgamer	4/5
VentureBeat	65/100

Kirby Star Allies received a "mixed or average" rating according to video game review aggregator website Metacritic, based on 83 critic reviews. The game was nominated for "Family Game of the Year" at the 22nd Annual D.I.C.E. Awards.

The game was praised for its visual appearance and strategic elements. Mitch Vogel from Nintendo Life called the visuals "top notch", but yearned for a more distinctive design. Destructoid reviewer Chris Carter praised the "gorgeous rendered backgrounds", and stated how recruiting enemies to your team "goes beyond an adorable gimmick." EGM appreciated the friend concept, and said it kept puzzles and game elements fresh throughout gameplay. Brendan Graeber from IGN liked the layer of strategy and the concept of re-arranging the friends for different puzzle solutions. He stated how puzzles were intriguing and unique, as they always had the player re-arranging their team. Critics also appreciated the accompanying soundtrack, calling it catchy and praising its gradual change. Peter Brown from GameSpot praised the visuals, and called the aesthetic "perfectly executed". He liked how the soundtrack would "ample motivation and entertainment", and enjoyed the gimmick of teaming up with enemies.

Critics complained of a lack of difficulty, which they felt induced a sense of being uninvolved. Polygon reviewer Jeremy Parrish called the game predictable and familiar, and wrote how the game "plays things incredibly safe", compared to recent titles such as Kirby: Planet Robobot. Kyle Hilliard from Game Informer summarized his review by nothing that the game was forgettable, and how the difficulty made him feel as if he was barely playing the game at all.

=== Post-launch ===
At the release of the game's final post-launch content, some critics reevaluated the game, finding that the additional content resulted in an improved experience. Stephen Totilo of Kotaku commented that, while the main game was "a cakewalk", the additional Heroes in Another Dimension mode was "a head-scratcher and a reflex-tester", stating that Star Allies was "one of the most-improved Nintendo games on the Switch roster."

=== Sales ===
Upon the game's launch, Kirby Star Allies became the fastest selling Kirby game in the United Kingdom. The game sold 222,031 copies within its first week on sale in Japan, which placed it at number one on the all format sales chart. By the end of March, it had sold over a million copies. As of March 2019, Kirby Star Allies has sold 2.56 million copies. The 2023 CESA Games White Papers revealed that Kirby Star Allies has sold 4.38 million copies, as of 31 December 2022.
