= Kirby Super Star Ultra =

2008 video game remake

- North American box art
- Developer: HAL Laboratory
- Publisher: Nintendo
- Director: Shinya Kumazaki
- Producers: Masayoshi Tanimura; Kensuke Tanabe
- Programmer: Shigenobu Kasai
- Artist: Hitoshi Kikkawa
- Composers: Jun Ishikawa; Hirokazu Ando
- Series: Kirby
- Platform: Nintendo DS
- Release: NA: September 22, 2008; JP: November 6, 2008; EU: September 18, 2009
- Genre: Platform
- Modes: Single-player, multiplayer

Kirby Super Star Ultra (Note: Released in Japan as Hoshi no Kirby Ultra Super Deluxe (星のカービィ ウルトラスーパーデラックス, Hoshi no Kābī Urutora Sūpā Derakkusu; Kirby of the Stars Ultra Super Deluxe)) is a 2008 anthology platform game developed by HAL Laboratory and published by Nintendo for the Nintendo DS. The game is an enhanced remake of Kirby Super Star, originally released for the Super Nintendo Entertainment System in 1996, to commemorate the Kirby series' 15th anniversary. The remake retains all game modes found in the original and adds four major new ones, along with adding updated visuals and full-motion video cutscenes.

The game was released in North America on September 22, 2008, in Japan on November 6, 2008, and in Europe on September 18, 2009. The game received positive reviews from critics, with praise for its conversion to handheld gameplay, graphics, soundtrack, and large amount of new content. Like its predecessor, it was also criticized for being too easy. Kirby Super Star Ultra sold just under 3 million copies, making it the best-selling Kirby game since the series' debut, Kirby's Dream Land, in 1992, and is currently the fourth best-selling game in the series.

== Gameplay and plot ==
Kirby Super Star Ultra is a side-scrolling platform game. Similar to previous entries in the Kirby series, the player controls Kirby to complete various levels while avoiding obstacles and enemies. Kirby can walk or run, jump, swim, crouch, slide, and inhale enemies or objects to spit them out as bullets. He can fly for a limited time by inflating himself; while flying, Kirby cannot attack or use his other abilities, though he can release a weak puff of air. By eating certain enemies, Kirby can gain copy abilities, power-ups allowing him to take on the properties the enemy possessed.

If Kirby uses a copy ability, he can produce a Helper, a character that can be controlled automatically or by another player by wireless multiplayer. Like Kirby, Helpers can float continuously, but can only use the copy ability they were based on. The player can also grant the Helper a different form or revert them into a power-up in an emergency. The player characters lose health if they are hit by enemies or hazards. Health can be replenished by eating food scattered across levels. If the Helper loses all their health, there is a short time for Kirby to grant it a new power before it disappears. If Kirby loses all of his health, the player will lose a life. Losing all lives results in a game over.

=== Game modes ===
Sword Kirby and Waddle Doo, fighting Fatty Whale in Milky Way Wishes. The bottom screen shows the player's current collected abilities, which can be tapped to activate.

Kirby Super Star Ultra retains all game modes found in Kirby Super Star, but adds four new main ones for a total of eleven game modes total. Kirby Super Star's minigames also return, while adding three more for a total of five. (Note: The original minigames include Samurai Kirby, a timing game reminiscent of a minigame from Kirby's Adventure (1993); and Megaton Punch, where players must punch a block stronger than their opponent. The new minigames include Kirby Card Swipe, a reaction-testing minigame; Kirby on the Draw, a cowboy themed shooter where Kirbys need to take out as many targets as possible; and Snack Tracks, where Kirbys sit at the bottom of a conveyor belt and try and direct as many food items into their mouths as possible. Up to four players can play the new minigames.) While most game modes retain the same game mechanics, they have different scenarios and objectives. Some games must be unlocked by playing others; a major change from Kirby Super Star involves Spring Breeze being the only one accessible from the start. All games must be completed fully for a 100% save file percentage. Kirby Super Star Ultra also expands the original game by adding new enemy types, levels, mid-bosses, bosses, music, and full-motion video cutscenes. The integration of the touchscreen of the Nintendo DS also changes accordingly depending on game mode.

==== Returning modes ====
- Spring Breeze: an abridged remake of the first Kirby game, Kirby's Dream Land (1992), with new added gameplay enhancements. King Dedede has stolen food from the citizens of Dream Land, and Kirby must reach the King's castle to challenge him. The bottom screen displays the current level and score while playing this mode. Using DS Download Play, Spring Breeze can be played with a second player without a second game card.
- Dyna Blade: Kirby must stop Dyna Blade, a giant bird, from disturbing Dream Land's crops. The mode consists of five levels that the player must clear, including a face off against Dyna Blade. There are also two secret areas and a mini-boss that moves across the world map. The bottom screen displays the world map, current stage, and score while playing this mode.
- Gourmet Race: a racing game in which Kirby races King Dedede while eating as much food as possible. It takes place across three courses. Players earn points from eating food and bonus points for finishing first in a race; whoever earns the most points by the end of all levels wins. Players can choose to race either King Dedede or a "ghost" (the player's best attempt at the race), or simply race alone for the fastest time. An expanded display has been added to the bottom screen, showing the location of Kirby and Dedede through each course, along with the past high-score for each course. The game can also be played in multiplayer, which was not possible in Kirby Super Star.
- The Great Cave Offensive: a Metroidvania adventure that sees Kirby explore a cave for treasure. 60 treasure chests are hidden across four areas, referencing other Nintendo franchises such as Metroid and The Legend of Zelda. Some generic treasures have been replaced with items referencing more recent Kirby titles, for example, the 'Dud' with the 'Cell Phone'. The bottom screen displays an extensive map that shows the player's current location, treasure and gold count, and if the player has found all the treasure in a specific area.
- Revenge of Meta Knight: a story-driven mode chronicling Kirby's efforts to stop Meta Knight, who attempts to take over Dream Land and end the inhabitants' "lazy" lifestyle by invading in his signature airship, the Halberd. Each level has a time limit, and Kirby will lose a life if the player does not finish in time. The Halberd takes damage after every level; the bottom screen shows the ship's current status and player's location. The player fights numerous bosses, and the mode culminates in a chase to escape the falling Halberd.
- Milky Way Wishes: the largest mode in the game. Because the Sun and Moon around planet Pop Star are fighting, a jester-like creature named Marx tells Kirby he must travel across eight planets and restore the giant wish-granting comet-clock Nova. The mode also features scrolling shooter elements. Unlike the other modes, Kirby cannot use copy abilities; instead, he collects "Copy Essence Deluxes". Once in Kirby's possession, they allow the player to select and tap a copy ability from the bottom screen, and are kept permanently. The bottom screen also shows the player's current location. In the end, Marx— who masterminded the conflict— wishes to Nova to control Pop Star, but Kirby stops him.
- The Arena: a boss attack mode that challenges the player to fight every boss in the game with only one life and a free selection of power-up at the start of the game. The player can replenish their health up to five times total between rounds, and are granted two power-ups at random. The current boss and time are now shown on the bottom screen.

==== New modes ====
- Revenge of the King: After being beaten by Kirby so many times, King Dedede vows to defeat him in one last ditch attempt. Revenge of the King is a more faithful remake of Kirby's Dream Land's extra mode, which essentially serves as a longer and more difficult version of Spring Breeze. Kabula, the one boss present in Kirby's Dream Land but not Spring Breeze has been added, along with harder versions of bosses, longer levels, and a completely revamped final fight. It is notable for being the last time canonically that King Dedede serves as a major antagonist to Kirby out of his own volition.
- Helper to Hero: A boss-rush mode where the player can control any one of the twenty Helpers in the game and utilise their unique movesets. In each Helper's campaign, their respective trials always culminate in a surprise final fight against Wham Bam Jewel, a newer and tougher version of Wham Bam Rock (the final boss of The Great Cave Offensive) who is fought immediately after the latter's defeat.
- Meta Knightmare Ultra: A condensed and remixed version of five of the seven original modes with new level layouts, allowing the player to play as Meta Knight. Meta Knight wishes to become the galaxy's greatest warrior, so he embarks on a long quest through Dream Land until he reaches his Halberd and flies into space with the intention of reviving the destroyed Nova from Milky Way Wishes. Nova then grants his wish to fight the greatest warrior in the galaxy, Galacta Knight. The player can activate special abilities using the bottom screen, which cost magic points to cast.
- The True Arena: A harder version of the regular Arena mode, containing all of the new bosses and mid-bosses added to the game, along with a unique version of Marx called Marx Soul that serves as the hidden final boss of the game. It is unlocked after completing all other modes.

== Development and release ==
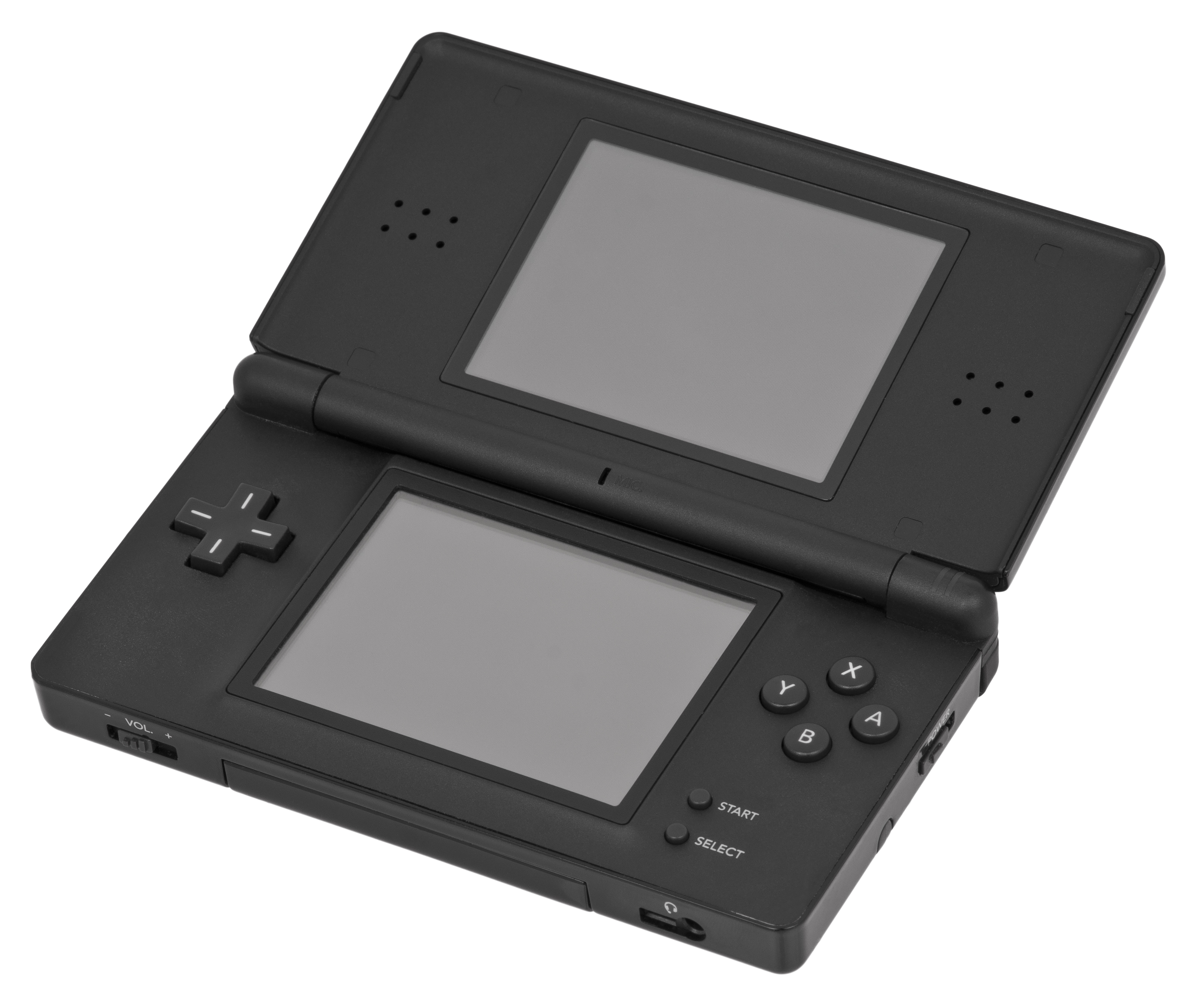
The Nintendo DS's dual screens (pictured) allowed the development team to revamp the game's heads-up display in different gameplay modes without disrupting gameplay on the top screen.

After the release of Kirby: Squeak Squad, HAL Laboratory's next Kirby project veered towards the idea of a remake of Kirby Super Star on the Nintendo DS. Originally it was meant to be a simpler remake, titled Kirby Super Deluxe Plus, but Masayoshi Tanimura, the president of HAL, requested from the team a deluxe package that would exceed customers' expectations. Kirby Super Star Ultra was exhibited at a trade show mid-development; the development team remarked that even though the show was aimed for adults and Wii Fit was the main attraction, the number of people who showed up at their booth exceeded expectations, as they held high nostalgia for Kirby Super Star. The direction of Kirby Super Star Ultra was handled by Shinya Kumazaki. The team's goal was to retain all modes from the SNES original; despite the game's considerable size, Kumazaki believed he could not remove anything due to fans' nostalgia, a sentiment shared with other members of the development team. Difficulty was also adjusted to make earlier sections, particularly Spring Breeze, easier than in Kirby Super Star, but is compensated with the addition of new harder modes like Revenge of the King. Player research with people who played Kirby Super Star was highly valued so that adjustments could be made for new players while keeping the original game's appeal, as the game was viewed not just as a remake in-house, but a new title.

The addition of the Nintendo DS's functionalities expanded and streamlined parts of the game originally locked behind menus, such as the ability to change abilities on the bottom screen in Milky Way Wishes, or the player's treasure collection in The Great Cave Offensive. This came from a desire to keep no information on the top screen when possible during play. Adjustments were made to Kirby's move set to enhance play; more copy abilities were considered during development but dropped, due to how it could upset the balance of the game modes. Including Kirby Super Star's co-operative play through the DS's wireless functionality was a key aim to the development team, and Kirby Super Star Ultra was further refined to allow every single mode to be played in co-op, unlike the original. The team felt a lot of pressure during development to retain the feature, as Shigeru Miyamoto had personally requested cooperative gameplay for Kirby Super Star on a visit to HAL Laboratory in 1996. Full-motion cutscenes were also added to enhance the game's story; these were kept short and faithful to Kirby Super Star in order to not disrupt the game's pacing.

Kirby Super Star Ultra's soundtrack was composed by Jun Ishikawa, who also worked on the original Kirby Super Star, and Hirokazu Ando, a veteran composer for the series who did not work on the original. New music was composed for the remake, including additional tracks for the original game modes and new tracks for the extra modes and cutscenes.

Kirby Super Star Ultra was released in North America on September 22, 2008, in Japan on November 6, 2008, and in Europe on September 18, 2009. The packaging design was initially planned to emulate a Paulownia wood box, as in the original game's Japanese packaging, with the addition of noshi paper wrapped around it. This would indicate that the product was an even more luxurious experience. However, Nintendo coordinator Mari Shirakawa was concerned that children would not understand the connection between Paulownia and luxury. As a result, the final packaging was designed with a coat of glitter to retain the sense of luxury while making it more accessible. Unlike Kirby Super Star, this packaging was retained worldwide.

== Reception ==
Reception

Aggregate scores
Aggregator	Score
GameRankings	80%
Metacritic	76/100

Review scores
Publication	Score
1Up.com	A−
Destructoid	8.5/10
Eurogamer	6/10
Famitsu	32/40
Game Informer	7/10
IGN	8.3/10 (AU); 7.9/10 (US)
Nintendo Life	9/10
Nintendo Power	9/10

Kirby Super Star Ultra received "generally favorable" reviews according to the review aggregation website Metacritic. Several reviewers gave praise to the updated graphics and audio-visual presentation, calling them "gorgeous" and "vivacious". Destructoid's Ashley Davis praised the game for its replay value and additional content, stating that "they feel like they could have been part of the original game, each bringing something different to the table". 1UP praised the game for its multiplayer and described it as "excellent", but noted while clever at times, the level design was not as intricate as in the Mario series. IGN Australia's Clara Barraza praised the game's visuals, replay value, and harder additional content, while remarking that, while fun, the first half of the game is "a bit on the easy side". She also referred to the minigames as "bland". IGN US's Craig Harris remarked that the gameplay of Kirby Super Star Ultra felt more at home on the Nintendo DS than its SNES counterpart. Nintendo Life's Stuart Reddick praised the gameplay and visual presentation, calling it "magnificent", but expressed disappointment about the lack of touchscreen controls. Game Informer's Matt Helgeson was less warm towards the game, calling it "a game that is clearly a few generations behind the times", but praised its graphics and replay value. Eurogamer's Keza MacDonald criticized the gameplay, stating that "it never forces you to use your adaptable powers in an intelligent or challenging way", and the game's short length, but praised the visuals, calling the standard "universally high". In Japan, Famitsu gave it a score of 32 out of 40.

Most, if not all reviewers, were critical or aware of the game's easy difficulty, but noted that it was standard for the Kirby series. Destructoid remarked that "if it's a really challenging game you are looking for, you probably want to look elsewhere. Ultra, like most other Kirby games, never gets too terribly hard."

=== Sales ===
Kirby Super Star Ultra was both a critical and commercial success, selling over one million copies in Japan, as its predecessor did, and selling just under 3 million copies worldwide, making Kirby Super Star Ultra the fourth best-selling entry in the series, behind Kirby and the Forgotten Land (2022), Kirby's Dream Land (1992), and Kirby Star Allies (2018), outselling the original Kirby Super Star by more than double.

On December 11, 2008, Super Star Ultra became a Famitsu Gold title. As of December 2008, it was the fifth best-selling Nintendo DS game in the U.S.
