= Flagship (company) =

Video game developer in Japan

Flagship Co., Ltd.
- Native name: 株式会社フラグシップ
- Romanized name: Kabushiki gaisha Furagushippu
- Type: Kabushiki gaisha
- Founded: April 24, 1997; 29 years ago
- Founder: Yoshiki Okamoto
- Defunct: June 1, 2007; 19 years ago
- Fate: Merged and folded into Capcom
- Headquarters: Chūō-ku, Osaka, Japan
- Area served: Video game development
- Owner: Capcom

Flagship Co., Ltd. (Japanese: 株式会社フラグシップ, Hepburn: Kabushiki gaisha Furagushippu) was an independent Japanese video game developer funded by Capcom, Nintendo, and Sega located in Chūō-ku, Osaka Japan that was founded by game designer Yoshiki Okamoto. Flagship had often created scenarios for new and existing products, and has developed for Nintendo several times on the Game Boy Color and Game Boy Advance. Their final video game was Kirby: Squeak Squad for the Nintendo DS.

== History ==
Flagship was founded by Yoshiki Okamoto on April 24, 1997. Funds and personnel for the startup were provided by Capcom, Sega, and Nintendo. The developer's first project was a series of episodic, Sega Saturn-exclusive RPGs, but it was never released.

In May 2007, Capcom announced that Flagship would cease to exist from June 1, 2007, and their employees merged into Capcom's main studio. Quoting GameSpot's news on the dissolution of Flagship Studios "According to a Capcom spokesperson, while the Flagship name is getting the axe, its employees won't be. Noting that the only thing to change will be the company name on their business cards, the spokesperson said all Flagship staffers are expected to continue working at the publisher in the same capacities".

== Games ==
Year	Title	Platform(s)	Publisher	Notes
1998	Resident Evil 2	PS1	Capcom	
2000	Resident Evil – Code: Veronica	Dreamcast	Capcom/Eidos	
2000	Resident Evil Survivor	PS1	Capcom/Eidos	
2000	Dino Crisis 2	PS1	Capcom/Virgin	
2001	Onimusha: Warlords	PS2	Capcom	
2001	The Legend of Zelda: Oracle of Seasons and Oracle of Ages	GBC	Nintendo	
2001	Bounty Hunter Sarah: Holy Mountain no Teiou	Dreamcast	Capcom	
2002	Resident Evil Zero	GameCube	Capcom	
2002	Onimusha 2: Samurai's Destiny	PS2	Capcom	
2002	The Legend of Zelda: A Link to the Past and Four Swords	GBA	Nintendo	Ported to GBA
2002	Clock Tower 3	PS2	Capcom	
2003	Resident Evil: Dead Aim	PS2	Capcom	
2003	Dino Crisis 3	Xbox	Capcom	
2004	Onimusha 3: Demon Siege	PS2	Capcom	
2004	The Legend of Zelda: The Minish Cap	GBA	Nintendo	Co-developed with Capcom
2004	Kirby & the Amazing Mirror	GBA	Nintendo	Co-developed with HAL Laboratory and Dimps
2005	Resident Evil 4	GameCube	Capcom	Two unused drafts
2005	Beck: The Game	PS2	Marvelous Entertainment	Co-developed with Sun-Tec
2006	Kirby: Squeak Squad	DS	Nintendo	Co-developed with HAL Laboratory and Natsume

== Drama albums ==
- BIO HAZARD DRAMA ALBUM ~Fate of Raccoon City~ Vol.1
- BIO HAZARD DRAMA ALBUM ~Fate of Raccoon City~ Vol.2
- BIO HAZARD DRAMA ALBUM ~Fate of Raccoon City~ Vol.3
- BIOHAZARD 2 DRAMA ALBUM ~Sherry, the Little Runaway~
- BIOHAZARD 2 DRAMA ALBUM ~Ada, the Female Spy, is Alive~

== Novels ==
- BIO HAZARD The Phantom Beast of the North Sea
