= Fire Emblem: Fortune's Weave =

2026 video game

- Game art, featuring multiple key characters
- Developers: Intelligent Systems; Nintendo
- Publisher: Nintendo
- Director: Toshiyuki Kusakihara
- Producers: Masahiro Higuchi; Genki Yokota
- Artist: Chinatsu Kurahana
- Composer: Takeru Kanazaki
- Series: Fire Emblem
- Platform: Nintendo Switch 2
- Release: September 17, 2026
- Genre: Tactical role-playing
- Mode: Single-player

Fire Emblem: Fortune's Weave (Note: Known in Japan as Fire Emblem: Banshisenkō (Japanese: ファイアーエムブレム 万紫千紅, Hepburn: Faiā Emuburemu: Banshisenkō)) is a 2026 tactical role-playing game co-developed by Intelligent Systems and Nintendo, and published by Nintendo for the Nintendo Switch 2. It is the eighteenth mainline installment in the Fire Emblem series, taking place in the same world as Fire Emblem: Three Houses. Set within the Dagdan Empire, the player takes on the role of four warriors in the Heroic Games to gain their heart's desire, and a hero chosen by the progenitor god Sothis to ensure their survival against the demon god Balor. Gameplay features turn-based combat, with players completing battles in both arena combat on a traditional grid-based system, and on missions beyond the Dagdan capital which use a party-based combat system.

Fortune's Weave included multiple staff from Three Houses including director Toshiyuki Kusakihara, producer Masahiro Higuchi, artist Chinatsu Kurahana, and sound director Takeru Kanazaki. Wanting to expand on the wider world of Three Houses, Kusakihara designed the game's world and story to reflect themes of family and change, designing the in-game world as an exotic and diverse region. The setting, inspired by the ancient Mediterranean, influenced both gameplay design and the art and music.

The game was released on September 17, 2026. Fortune's Weave received critical acclaim and was praised for its narrative, characters, gameplay, and orchestral score, with several outlets touting it as among the best games in the series to date. It sold 1.34 million copies in its first two weeks after release.

== Gameplay ==
A battle in Fire Emblem: Fortune's Weave; protagonist Leda prepares to engage in combat with an enemy unit during the traditional grid-based combat.

Fire Emblem: Fortune's Weave is a tactical role-playing game in which players take on the role of five different characters: a customizable protagonist named Eshmel by default, and four named characters with their own story campaigns dubbed the Flame Lords—Cai, Dietrich, Theodora, and Leda. Following an introductory section, the player can choose which of the Flame Lords to control, going through dedicated story campaigns set during the Heroic Games event within the city of Dagsion. Dagsion acts as both main narratives' central location, and a hub for the player to explore and shop for equipment and items, recruit new party units for battle, and visit locations to receive boons from the nation's gods, which provide various positive effects during combat. The story is separated by arena matches as part of the Heroic Games, and free time periods where the player can explore beyond Dagsion for additional combat and quests. The party can stay at inns in Dagsion, gaining additional experience points and items along with character-focused story events. Players can recruit characters to their army by increasing their renown, a statistic which indicates fame and wealth that increases through completing various quests, and can increase their support rank with individual given characters. Another mechanic, Bird Time, is used by Eshmel to allow them to increase their support ranks with already recruited characters.

Locations beyond Dagsion are visited using a world map, where players encounter additional Skirmish battles alongside new item vendors, supply caches, and explorable regions. The protagonist of each scenario has a unique gameplay ability tied to overworld exploration: Cai can tame mounts, Deitrich can locate enemies on the world map, Theodora can recruit soldiers for exploration or aiding in combat, and Leda can earn additional rewards by performing at inns. Dungeons, which can appear either randomly or as part of story events, have the player navigating in real-time with a squad of four chosen units.

The game's turn-based combat system is split into two forms: the Fire Emblem series' recurring grid-based combat dubbed "Matches", and a party-based version exclusive to dungeon exploration, compared to early Final Fantasy and Dragon Quest games, dubbed "Clashes". In Match combat, players can perform a move, and an attack during their turn, with the goal being defeating the enemy using tactics including flanking positions or defeating a boss enemy. Player units can hold multiple weapon types to attack, and can combine some techniques depending on their current equipment. Each Match begins with the player positioning their units before combat begins, with a unit's movement range displayed in blue and attack range in red. During matches there is an option to rewind time to a limited degree to undo and retry combat actions. Dungeon combat has the chosen party of four facing enemy groups, who are able to use combination attacks between units, though these can only be used a limited amount of times throughout the entire dungeon. This combat can be sped up or skipped entirely.

Playable unit abilities are dictated by a class system, divided into three ranks with multiple classes within these ranks. Different classes allow for and unlock exclusive moves or passive abilities. There are multiple weapon types available dependent on a unit's class: swords, spears, axes, bows, gauntlets, and magic. Each weapon type has a different effect, such as magic being effective against heavily-armored units or spears having a longer range. Weapons have a durability level, which is lowered by performing a powerful Combat Art. The Fire Lords can also perform Blaze Arts, super moves which drain their health while granting a powerful ability such as a large attack or teleporting to another location. Use of Blaze Arts grants the user statistical boosts, but overusing them permanently reduces their health for the remainder of combat. Depending on their current skills, a unit can be taken to a Certification Exam in Dagsion to be granted a new class. Units can either join during the story, or be recruited once certain conditions are met.

== Synopsis ==
=== Setting and characters ===
Fortune's Weave is set in the same world as Fire Emblem: Three Houses, taking place in the neighboring continent of Dagda. The Dagdan Empire is bordered by the three suzerain nations of Saramis, Arago and Brezarant, and has its capital in Dagsion at the continent's center. Within the Dagdan Empire, a nine-month combat event called the Heroic Games is held in honor of the empire's titular founding god-emperor, where the winner is granted their heart's desire. The inciting incident is the revival of the demon god Balor, who will ravage the land shortly after the Heroic Games take place. After an initial scene during Balor's rampage, the story takes place during the Heroic Games themselves, with the player able to swap between the four key characters to experience and guide their stories through the Heroic Games.

The protagonist Eshmel, also called the "Savior" and the "Promised One", is a figure from five years in the future who is charged with ensuring the survival of the Flame Lords against Balor's revival using time-traveling abilities. The Flame Lords are Cai, a young man from the country who enters the Heroic Games to free his father from imprisonment; Dietrich, a noble from the Three Houses setting of Fódlan who craves strong opponents to fight; Theodora, the Queen of Saramis seeking to cement her rulership and restore the worship of a detested goddess; and Leda, a noble disguised as a dancer who is hunting her father's killer Bertrand. The supporting cast includes Fortuna (also called "Voice Upon the Peak"), the goddess of fate who facilitates Eshmel's mission with her ability to alter the past; Solel, the sun god who currently rules Dagda and oversees the Heroic Games; and the progenitor god Sothis, returning from Three Houses.

=== Story ===
In imperial year 1454, Balor is resurrected and his undead army swarms Dagda. Sothis tasks Eshmel with defeating Balor, with Fortuna allying with Eshmel to save them from the undead Flame Lords and take them to the Obelisk Chamber. In that place, Fortuna can use her power to send Eshmel back to 1449, the year of the Heroic Games, so Eshmel can guide the Flame Lords' fates away from death and enlist them in the fight against Balor. Across each route, Eshmel and Fortuna uncover multiple conspiracies orchestrated by the children of Balor to ensure his return. Eshmel does not need to go through every route to complete the story.

- Fox Obelisk: Cai: Cai's father Castor is arrested for eloping with the goddess Aurora— Cai's mother and Solel's daughter— fifteen years prior. Meeting with Aurora, Cai enlists in the Heroic Games with friends to save his father from execution. During the Games, Cai investigates the temple of Aurora's grandfather Balor. He also clears Aurora's name by solving the mystery of a string of disappearances in her temple, for which she was blamed and confined. Cai learns that Castor is terminally ill, so he and Aurora resolve to make the most of their time with him. However, Castor sympathizes with Bertrand and joins him in battle against Cai in the Games' final match. Cai emerges victorious and wishes for Solel to speak with Aurora. After they reconcile, Aurora adopts the name Laura and abdicates her temple and title to live with Cai and Castor in Ribeira.
- Lion Obelisk: Dietrich: After surviving his ship's destruction by the sea monster Cetus, Dietrich enters the Games to gain a means to kill Cetus and test the power of Answerer, a cursed Hero's Relic tied to Sothis's power. Notable allies are the fisherwoman Esmeralda, and Fabio, a survivor of an ancient people destroyed by Sothis. Together with Dietrich, they explore ancient monuments across Dagda. After passing the Games' qualifiers, Dietrich receives permission from Solel to kill Cetus, revealed to be an ally of Fódlan's founder Nemesis cursed by another Hero's Relic. After Dietrich's final opponent, Theodora, is forced to withdraw, he wishes for a match against the god Mars, during which he overuses Answerer and nearly transforms into a monster himself. Fabio and Esmeralda, who have both fallen in love with him, prevent him from transforming. Mars acknowledges Dietrich as Dagda's strongest mortal.
- Wolf Obelisk: Theodora: Theodora loses her father and right arm during her brother Dyan's coup. Using her ancestor Mahadu's prosthetic arm and a charm to suppress Balor's curse within it, she exiles Dyan and claims the throne. Three years later, she enters the Heroic Games alongside her retainers, seeking to annex the ancient territory of Cybele and restore the honor of Yu Phas, Aurora's mother who was executed by Dagda during his initial rule. During the Games, Theodora repeatedly fights against Balor's influence until Aurora purifies Mahadu's Arm. When Dyan allies with the foreign kingdom of Mosa to reclaim Saramis, Theodora withdraws from the Games and leads her forces to Fort Zanbar, where she executes Dyan and his followers.
- Eagle Obelisk: Leda: Leilidahna sees her father killed by Bertrand in the Cydonia Massacre. Her ally, Father Mahdel, gives her a list of the conspirators before seemingly killing himself. Calling herself "Leda" and travelling as a dancer, she enters the Games with her companions to locate Lechner, the last conspirator, and Bertrand. During the Games, Leda's reliance on her cursed vihuela Obsidian strains her relationships, and she ends her friendship with Queen Aswan of Arago over her support for Bertrand. Maria, chancellor of Arago and daughter of Balor, kills Lechner to conceal the truth behind the massacre, then lures Leda and resurrects Guillermo as a risen dead. Mahdel, who faked his death and went under the guise of Mandalan, sacrifices himself to help Leda escape. After defeating Bertrand, Leda learns he agreed to protect her in Guillermo's stead but was framed for the murder of Arago's king. She postpones killing him, and wishes for Solel to reopen the massacre investigation. Following Maria's death, Leda seeks a way to free Guillermo's soul from the underworld.

One month after the Heroic Games conclude, Dagda reawakens and begins a tyrannical rule, executing Solel and ordering a genocidal war against Saramis. Theodora leads Saramis into battle against Dagda, and is quickly joined by Bertrand, now king of Brezarant. After eliminating Gilchris, the King of Arago, the two make their way into Dagsion, discovering that Dagda and his minister Raksha have murdered all of the civilians in the city to empower him. Theodora defeats Dagda in battle, and Raksha betrays and ritually sacrifices him. She is revealed to be Lyrah, a daughter of Balor, and has been manipulating Dagda for centuries to ensure her father's resurrection. Theodora and her allies pursue Lyrah, but are unable to prevent her from completing the ritual to resurrect Balor. Eshmel and Fortuna intervene to save the Flame Lords from certain death as the underworld invasion begins.

Back in the present and with the surviving Flame Lords, Eshmel destroys the underworld gate in Dagsion. Eshmel marshals the continent's forces to destroy the other underworld gates, weakening Balor. Eventually, as a solar eclipse which will empower Balor approaches, Eshmel and Fortuna's army besieges the Temple of Balor and kills Lyrah, then descend into the Underworld to defeat Balor's avatar. While their allies escape, Eshmel and Fortuna make their way into the heart of the underworld and destroy Balor's true body. If all four Flame Lords were saved, Fortuna sacrifices herself to ensure Eshmel's escape as peace returns to Dagda. In a post-credits scene, Sothis begins to narrate the story of how she came to Fódlan and Dagda to an unseen listener.

== Development ==
Fortune's Weave was co-developed by recurring studio Intelligent Systems and series publisher Nintendo for the Nintendo Switch 2. Multiple Three Houses staff returned, including director Toshiyuki Kusakihara and producer Masahiro Higuchi from Intelligent Systems, and Nintendo's Genki Yokota and Kenta Nakanishi in producing and supervising roles. Since the 2019 release of Three Houses, Kusakihara wanted to portray other regions referenced within the game, choosing Dagda as a more vibrant and diverse place to explore. Building on their experience co-developing Three Houses with Koei Tecmo, Intelligent Systems opted to co-develop Fortune's Weave with Nintendo to properly realise Kusakihara's ambitions for the game. While the core Fire Emblem gameplay was carried over, the team also adjusted the class system, added more exploration elements and reintroduced dungeon exploration that had first been used in Fire Emblem Echoes: Shadows of Valentia (2017). Due to the breadth of content and potential for repetition across story routes, Nakanishi worked to make each route's gameplay style unique. The team also expanded the number of character classes and weapons available, with their new units designed based on the game's exotic setting. Due to technical limitations caused by the ability to switch between story paths and elements carrying over between them, the team had to limit players to a single auto-saved file.

Discussing the setting, Kusakihara wanted a more varied setting with an emphasis on freedom and diversity compared to the strictly ordered setting of Three Houses, drawing inspiration from cultures of the ancient Mediterranean. In contrast to earlier Fire Emblem games which placed focus on noble protagonists with clear heroes and villains, both Nakanishi and Kusakihara wanted a cast that would grow sympathetic to players over time even with an initial antagonistic impression. A central theme of the narrative was family and how people chose to live, using different expressions of these themes with each of the four leads. During early production, there were only the four lead characters, with the storyline focusing on their different perspectives on the Heroic Games. Kusakihara originally wanted eight leads, but Yokota advised halving the number. To create a connecting thread between them and allow a broader view of the overall story, Eshmel was created midway through production and consequently the story was rewritten to incorporate the time travel element. While the story focused around unifying factions rather than the conflict-driven story of Three Houses, they carried over the approach of introducing players to a large cast at once rather than the small initial casts of earlier Fire Emblem games.

Chinatsu Kurahana returned from Three Houses as character designer, wanting her design style carried over into a title set within the same world. According to Kusakihara, Kurahana enjoyed her work on the project but found designing Eshmel challenging as they had to show personality while being dressed completely in white, going through multiple design and revision phases. The increased hardware power allowed for more detailed character designs and artwork than had been possible before. Takeru Kanazaki also returned as sound director, with Kusakihara giving guidance of blending flamenco music with "strange-ancient" and "wonder-ancient" motifs, wanting it to be a stark contrast to the music of Three Houses.

== Promotion and release ==
Fortune's Weave was announced in September 2025 as the final reveal of a Nintendo Direct broadcast. The game's Japanese title, Banshisenkō, is derived from a idiom describing a scene of blooming multicolored flowers. The game was released worldwide on September 17, 2026. Alongside standard physical and digital editions, a "Dagdan Collection" special edition was released, containing an artbook and themed merchandise. Retailer Walmart held a promotion that allowed players to save $10 USD on the game, though the code sometimes did not work properly. As a result, many players bought it alongside a banana, which was believed to guarantee the code to work; this was believed to have caused a shortage of bananas at the chain. The game received a day one patch that added weapons from past games in the series and fixed several in-game bugs.

As part of the game's promotion, characters from the game were featured in the mobile spin-off Fire Emblem Heroes, and a manga adaptation by Kazurou Kyou which was first released in an issue of Saikyō Jump in September 2026. The prologue of the manga was made available in English on the Nintendo Today mobile app on September 19th. Nintendo released several promotional tie-in events to the game, including a sweepstakes that let players win prizes, such as a paper theatre themed around the game, as well as the release of icons purchasable on Nintendo Switch consoles featuring the game's characters. Physical merchandise was released in select stores across Japan on the same day as the game's release, with further plans to release figurines based on the game's characters. Merchandise was also made available on Intelligent Systems' store, which launched on the same day as Fortune's Weave's release.

On October 14, 2026, the game was announced to be receiving downloadable content (DLC) in the form of an "expansion pass", which adds three "waves" of DLC to the game. The first wave adds weapons from Three Houses, which was released on the same day the DLC was revealed, and the second adds new outfits and the inclusion of several in-universe gods as playable characters, which is set to release during the holiday period of 2026. The third is set to release in 2027, and will add story routes for four of the game's major supporting characters.

== Reception ==
Reception

Aggregate scores
Aggregator	Score
Metacritic	89/100 (Note: Score based on 107 reviews)
OpenCritic	95% recommend (Note: Score based on 124 reviews)

Review scores
Publication	Score
Destructoid	9/10
Eurogamer	5/5
Game Informer	8.75/10
GameSpot	9/10
IGN	10/10

Fire Emblem: Fortune's Weave received "generally favorable" reviews from critics, according to review aggregator Metacritic. This placed it as the second-highest rated game in the series on the site, tied with Three Houses. OpenCritic determined that 97% of critics recommended the game. The game was noted by critics and players for its long play time and breadth of content, with the website How Long to Beat, which describes how long players took to beat the game, only having two listings from players over a week after the game released.

Several critics described the game as being among the best in the series, with many describing it as a strong improvement on past entries. Its gameplay received positive responses from critics, who praised it for its depth, strategy, and improvement on past entries' mechanics, such as via the Blaze Arts mechanic, which they felt added extra depth to the series' gameplay formula. The game's soundtrack, described as orchestral by Game Informer, has also both been met with positive responses from critics.

Brendan Graeber of IGN enjoyed seeing how the characters developed as the game progressed, praising how each of their stories eventually revealed more of the overarching narrative. Polygon's Josh Broadwell described this freedom as existing "to give you options, not to take your time," with Empire's Matt Kamen agreeing, stating all of the game's various mechanics never feel like "busywork" for the player. The ability to replay chapters in the game was highlighted by critics as allowing for greater player freedom without requiring players to restart their playthrough entirely. Game Informer reviewer Eric Van Allen found the story's long length to be paid off exceptionally well by its end, finding that the game's expansive scope and story beats "dig deep into the world's lore". Broadwell found that the story being told over multiple routes, with the story being pieced together throughout, helped give the game "a sense of vastness and a capability to surprise that's rare in modern video games." Reviewers at Nintendo Life found the game, however, to "drag" during the game's second chapter, following the initial four story routes.

The game's characters were positively received by critics. GameSpot's Steve Watts found the game's main characters to be equally compelling, and felt that seeing the events of the story through the perspectives of its various protagonists to be interesting, a viewpoint shared by Van Allen. Brendan Graeber of IGN enjoyed seeing how the characters developed as the game progressed, praising how each character's story eventually revealed more of the bigger story within the game. Kamen praised the characters, stating that each of the four story arcs were "so well developed they could serve as the sole basis of a game in their own rights." Graeber additionally highlighted the character work present in the game's rival characters, and though he felt that some of the game's additional recruits and Eshmel lacked a lot of strong character moments, he felt they worked in a way that did not detract from the game's overall story. Nintendo Life criticized Eshmel, who they felt to be unnecessary due to the bulk of the game being spent with the other four protagonists.

Watts found the game's map to be overly simplistic, and felt the game's various menus were "overstuffed". Van Allen found the dungeon exploration to be overly repetitive, especially across the multiple characters' routes, and similarly felt that map exploration could drag down the enjoyment in a playthrough the further a player went into the game. Graeber however found the planning needed to successfully take advantage of the map and explorations to be a fun added hurdle to the game's strategy gameplay. Dom Peppiatt of Eurogamer found that the game had an easier difficulty than past Fire Emblem games. While difficulty options were adjustable, Peppiatt felt this quality was a negative that would be apparent for both new and returning players.

=== Sales ===
Fortune's Weave sold 127,131 retail copies during its launch week in Japan, debuting at No. 1. As of September 30, 2026, it has sold 1.34 million copies worldwide, making it the seventh best-selling Switch 2 game.

=== Awards ===
Awards and nominations for Fire Emblem: Fortune's Weave
Year	Award	Category	Result	Ref.
2026	Golden Joystick Awards	Best Storytelling	Nominated	
2026	Golden Joystick Awards	Console Game of the Year	Nominated	
2026	The Game Awards 2026	Best Role Playing Game	Pending	
