= Meta Knight =

Kirby character

- Kirby character
- Meta Knight in Kirby Super Star
- First game: Kirby's Adventure (1993)
- Created by: Masahiro Sakurai
- Voiced by: Various: Eric Stuart (anime) Eric Newsome (Super Smash Bros. series) Atsushi Kisaichi (Japanese)

In-universe information
- Weapon: Galaxia

Meta Knight (Japanese: メタナイト, Hepburn: Meta Naito) is a major character in HAL Laboratory's Kirby franchise. He debuted in 1993's Kirby's Adventure and he has since appeared in many subsequent entries as either a boss or playable character. Meta Knight also appears in several Kirby manga, the anime Kirby: Right Back at Ya! and as a playable character in the Super Smash Bros. series since Super Smash Bros. Brawl.

In the games, Meta Knight serves as one of Kirby's most important foes. Following a strict code of honor, his boss fights feature him offering a sword to Kirby before battle, though he will proceed regardless of the player's choice. Initially portrayed as antagonistic, he becomes an ally to Kirby in later games and, like King Dedede, becomes a victim of brainwashing by much more sinister forces.

Meta Knight is an experienced swordsman who wields a legendary sword called "Galaxia" and can transform his cape into a set of bat-like wings that allow him to fly. He commands an army called the "Meta-Knights" to accomplish his goals. He also serves as the owner of an airship called the "Halberd", which was originally built to take over Dream Land and later used to defend Planet Popstar from foreign invaders.

The character has become one of the franchise's most prominent characters and has been a subject of numerous theories, particularly regarding his resemblance to Kirby outside of his mask. His role as a player character in Super Smash Bros. Brawl became controversial due to his high attack speed and versatility overpowering much of the roster, leading to bans from the competitive scene.

== Concept and design ==
Meta Knight is an enigmatic yet honorable swordsman who follows a chivalric code, exemplified when he gives Kirby a sword to fight with before starting battle. Meta Knight himself wields a golden sword called Galaxia (ギャラクシア, Gyarakushia). He is always seen wearing a silver mask, but in the event that he is unmasked, he looks identical to Kirby, (Note: This fact has even led to people speculating if Kirby and Meta Knight are from the same race, species or genus, if Meta Knight is Kirby from another timeline, or if Meta Knight is his older brother.) albeit with a dark blue body (Note: In his debut, Meta Knight's body was presented as black and his mantle as red.), yellow eyes, and arms. His eyes were previously white underneath his mask; beginning in Kirby: Planet Robobot, they are yellow without his mask on as well. His speaking voice, while seldomly heard, is often deep and accentuated. He also sports a navy blue mantle called the Dimensional Cape (ディメンションマント, Dimenshon Manto), which can change into a pair of wings and allows him to teleport. However, these wings appear directly attached to his body in Kirby's Return to Dream Land and Kirby: Planet Robobot. Initially one of Kirby's enemies, he has since developed into Kirby's rival, and has been described as an antihero. However, he has benign intentions, as he will often fight alongside or assist Kirby when necessary for his survival or for the sake of the world.

== Appearances ==
Meta Knight first appeared in the NES game Kirby's Adventure as an ally of King Dedede and boss of the Orange Ocean level, where he fights Kirby to stop him from taking a piece of the Star Rod and to keep it out of Nightmare's hands. Meta Knight also trains Kirby throughout the game with his army, the Meta-Knights. He is the main villain of the Revenge of Meta Knight mode in Kirby Super Star, in which he invades Dream Land in his signature airship, the Battleship Halberd, and attempts to take it over to end the inhabitants' lazy lifestyle. Meta Knight is a playable character in the Meta Knightmare mode of Kirby: Nightmare in Dream Land, Kirby Super Star Ultra and in Kirby Planet Robobot. In Kirby & the Amazing Mirror, Dark Meta Knight—an evil, Mirror World counterpart—traps Meta Knight in the Dimension Mirror and splits Kirby into four differently colored copies of himself. After Kirby defeats Dark Meta Knight, Meta Knight himself helps Kirby defeat Dark Mind.

In Kirby: Squeak Squad, after the chest containing Kirby's strawberry shortcake is mixed up with the chest sealing Dark Nebula, Meta Knight appears as a boss who tries to keep the latter chest out of Kirby's hands. Meta Knight also appears in Kirby's Return to Dream Land and its 2023 remake as one of the four playable protagonists, alongside Kirby, King Dedede and Bandana Waddle Dee, and as a playable character in its multi-player mode. After not appearing in Kirby: Triple Deluxe or Kirby and the Rainbow Curse, (Note: Though Meta Knight himself is absent of the game itself, a collectible mask based on Meta Knight is available in Dedede's Drum Dash Deluxe, an enhanced version of a minigame of Kirby: Triple Deluxe.) Meta Knight made an active return to the series in Kirby: Planet Robobot. After being captured and transformed into the hostile "Mecha Knight" in the game's story mode, he is rescued by Kirby and helps him to defeat Star Dream by letting Kirby pilot the Halberd. Meta Knight appears as a boss and Dream Friend in Kirby Star Allies. Meta Knight returns in Kirby Fighters 2 alongside King Dedede as the main villain of the Story Mode, The Destined Rivals. He also appears as a playable character. Meta Knight appears in the colosseum in Kirby and the Forgotten Land, but does not encounter Kirby in the main storyline.

Meta Knight also appears in several spin-off games in the series. He makes brief appearances in Kirby's Pinball Land and Kirby's Avalanche. In the latter, he is the penultimate challenger, and his name was revealed in-game for the first time. He is an unlockable character in Kirby Air Ride and a playable character in the sequel, Kirby Air Riders.

Meta Knight also appears in four installments of the Super Smash Bros. video game series; in Super Smash Bros. Melee, he appears in the form of a trophy, and in Super Smash Bros. Brawl, he is a playable character. However, Meta Knight was temporarily removed from some competitions in the United States and Canada as he was considered to be too powerful. He also plays a major role in the game's story mode, The Subspace Emissary, in which he seeks to reclaim his ship from the Subspace Army, teaming up with Marth, Ike, Ice Climbers, Lucario, and Solid Snake in the process. Meta Knight returned as a playable character in Super Smash Bros. for Nintendo 3DS and Wii U after the series' director, Masahiro Sakurai, assured some changes to re-add him; among the changes, Meta Knight lost his ability to glide, and his attack speed was toned down. He reappears as a playable character in Super Smash Bros. Ultimate. Meta Knight's unmasked appearance is also available as an alternate skin for Kirby in that game.

=== Other appearances ===
Meta Knight has made several appearances outside of the Kirby video game series, including the 1994–2006 manga Hoshi no Kirby: Dedede de Pupupu na Monogatari written by Hirokazu Hikawa and published by Shogakukan in CoroCoro Comic. In the anime Kirby: Right Back at Ya!, he is the last surviving member of the Galaxy Soldier Army, made up of "Star Warriors". He also makes various appearances in the restaurant chain known as Kirby Café.

Various types of merchandising have been released based on Meta Knight's character. These include amiibos, nendoroids, nanoblocks, and plushies.

== Reception ==
Meta Knight was referred to by Shacknews as "arguably Nintendo's most recognizable anti-hero". Inside Games writer Sushi praised the scene of Meta Knight ordering his troops to evacuate, particularly Meta Knight murmuring an apology to them when they stay behind, saying that this scene helped make Meta Knight cool and a popular character. Jeux Video staff felt that their mysterious nature helped make him a more popular character. They speculated that Meta Knight's shift from being an opponent to being an ally was due to Meta Knight's appearance in the Kirby: Right Back at Ya! anime, as well as the departure of series creator Masahiro Sakurai. Official Nintendo Magazine writer Chris Scullion felt excited to see him appear in Kirby's Epic Yarn, identifying himself as a Meta Knight fan and attributing his appreciation for Meta Knight to Meta Knight's mysterious nature, discussing how his alignment was unclear. He also argued that Meta Knight was previously not one of Nintendo's bigger characters, only to become a "cult hero" due to his appearance in Super Smash Bros. Brawl.

Meta Knight is a particularly strong, "high-tier" player character in Super Smash Bros. Brawl, which made him the subject of commentary by fans and critics alike. At Apex 2012, Meta Knight was used by half of the top eight competitors, and 21 of the top 64 used him as well, the latter being three times as common as the next most-used character, Captain Olimar. This led to the director of Apex, Chris Brown, to announce that he would be banned from the tournament the following year. Brown believed that, with Meta Knight banned, the game would become more balanced. Apex 2012 was the last major tournament to feature Meta Knight before he was banned. He had been banned for use in prior tournaments, though such a ban was not required by the Unity Ruleset, the guidelines most tournaments in the US and Canada follow. The process of approving the ban involved both an agreement by the Unity Ruleset Committee and player consensus, polling members of the forums of Smashboards, AllisBrawl, and the Brawl Back Room, the latter being a secret forum for the "best and brightest" Smash players. They also polled the top 100 players on Smashboards, who voted in favor of a ban 60–40. However, the ban took years before it was implemented, due in part to some professional players relying on Meta Knight to win tournaments, as well as the logistics of getting many tournaments on board. People were also concerned that tournament players from outside the US and Canada may avoid Unity Ruleset tournaments if such a ban went through.
