= List of best-selling Nintendo Switch 2 games =

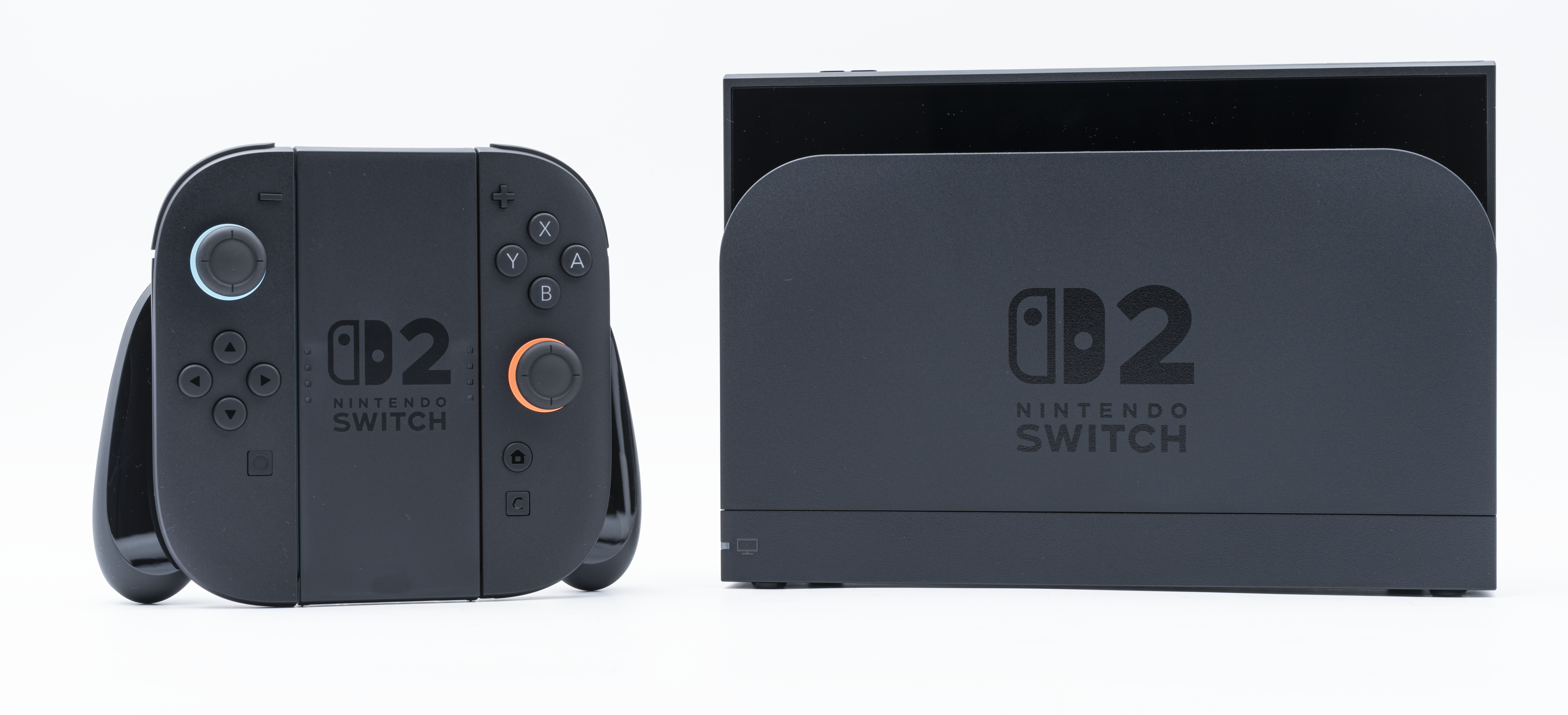
A Nintendo Switch 2 console with Joy-Con 2

This is a list of the best selling video games for the Nintendo Switch 2 that have sold or shipped at least one million copies. As Nintendo shares the sales of their video games every quarter while most other publishers do not share sales figures per console, the top of this list consists mostly of Nintendo-published titles that have sold or shipped at least one million copies. The rest of the figures are from Japanese physical software sales, corroborated from weekly reports. Nintendo Switch 2, a hybrid home console and handheld device, launched worldwide on June 5, 2025. Within the first four days, it sold over 3.5 million units, making it the fastest-selling Nintendo console to date.

As of September 30, 2026, Mario Kart World has sold 16.48 million units, making it the best-selling Switch 2 game.

== List ==
List of best-selling Nintendo Switch 2 video games
Title	Copies sold	As of	Release date (Note: Only the initial release date on this platform is listed.)	Genre(s)	Developer(s)	Publisher(s)
Mario Kart World	16.48 million	September 30, 2026	June 5, 2025	Kart racing	Nintendo EPD	Nintendo
The Legend of Zelda: Ocarina of Time	5.2 million	November 9, 2026	November 5, 2026	Action-adventure	Nintendo EPD	Nintendo
Pokémon Pokopia	≥ 5.18 million (Note: Pokémon Pokopia sales breakdown: Worldwide – 4.04 million (physical and digital); Japan – 1.14 million (physical only, no digital disclosure))	November 1, 2026	March 5, 2026	Social simulation; sandbox	Game Freak; Omega Force	JP: The Pokémon Company; WW: Nintendo
Donkey Kong Bananza	5.05 million	September 30, 2026	July 17, 2025	Platformer; action-adventure	Nintendo EPD	Nintendo
Pokémon Legends: Z-A – Nintendo Switch 2 Edition	4.04 million (Note: Nintendo Switch 2 Edition sales figures reflect physical copies only; digital purchases are counted under the Nintendo Switch version.)	September 30, 2026	October 16, 2025	Action role-playing	Game Freak	The Pokémon Company; Nintendo
Splatoon Raiders	2.42 million	September 30, 2026	July 23, 2026	Third-person shooter; action role-playing	Nintendo EPD	Nintendo
Kirby Air Riders	1.94 million	September 30, 2026	November 20, 2025	Kart racing	Bandai Namco Studios; Sora Ltd	Nintendo
Fire Emblem: Fortune's Weave	1.34 million	September 30, 2026	September 17, 2026	Tactical role-playing	Intelligent Systems	Nintendo
Super Mario Party Jamboree – Nintendo Switch 2 Edition + Jamboree TV	1.28 million	September 30, 2026	July 24, 2025	Party	Nintendo Cube	Nintendo
Star Fox	1.17 million	September 30, 2026	June 25, 2026	Rail shooter	Velan Studios	Nintendo
Hyrule Warriors: Age of Imprisonment	1 million	January 26, 2026	November 6, 2025	Hack and slash	AAA Games Studio	JP: Koei Tecmo; WW: Nintendo

== See also ==
- List of best-selling Nintendo video games
- List of best-selling Nintendo Switch video games
