= Mario Kart World =

2025 video game

- Developer: Nintendo EPD (Note: Additional development support by Monolith Soft, 1-Up Studio, and Bandai Namco Studios)
- Publisher: Nintendo
- Directors: Kenta Sato; Masaaki Ishikawa; Shintaro Jikumaru
- Producer: Kosuke Yabuki
- Designer: Shintaro Jikumaru
- Programmer: Kenta Sato
- Artist: Masaaki Ishikawa
- Composers: Atsuko Asahi; Maasa Miyoshi; Takuhiro Honda; Yutaro Takakuwa
- Series: Mario Kart
- Platform: Nintendo Switch 2
- Release: June 5, 2025
- Genre: Kart racing
- Modes: Single-player, multiplayer

Mario Kart World (Note: Japanese: マリオカートワールド, Hepburn: Mario Kāto Wārudo) is a 2025 kart racing game developed and published by Nintendo for the Nintendo Switch 2. As in previous Mario Kart games, players control Mario series characters as they race against opponents. World introduces an open-world design and mode, off-roading techniques, an elimination rally mode, and unlockable costumes for the playable characters. Races support up to 24 players, twice as many as the previous installment, Mario Kart 8 Deluxe (2017).

EPD began developing Mario Kart World for the Nintendo Switch in 2017, shortly before the release of Mario Kart 8 Deluxe. Feeling they had already perfected the core racing gameplay, the team introduced open-world elements; the title Mario Kart World was chosen over Mario Kart 9 to signify the new approach. Development moved to the Switch 2 in 2020 due to hardware limitations. The soundtrack, composed by a team led by Atsuko Asahi, features over 200 tracks, including rearrangements of themes from across the Mario franchise.

Nintendo released Mario Kart World on June 5, 2025, as a launch title for the Switch 2; it is the console's best-selling game, having sold 16.48 million copies as of September 30, 2026. It received positive reviews and was met with praise for its gameplay and innovations, but criticism for a number of design choices.

== Gameplay ==
Waluigi gliding through the stage Wario Stadium during an online multiplayer round of Knockout Tour

Mario Kart World is a kart racing game. As in previous Mario Kart games, players race as characters from the Mario series while using various items as a means of getting an advantage over other players. The game features 50 playable characters; 24 of the playable characters have alternate unlockable costumes accessed by consuming food items found throughout races, while most of the remaining characters additionally exist as obstacles on the game's tracks. It supports up to 24 players, twice as many compared to Mario Kart 8 Deluxe (2017) and Mario Kart Wii (2008), and includes features such as an open-world design, a day-night cycle, photo mode, amphibious vehicles, and various parkour mechanics. (Note: Mechanics include Grind rails and wall riding.)

Unlike in prior Mario Kart games, the Grand Prix mode does not consist of four standard races; only the first race is a traditional three-lap, with the following races requiring racers to drive to each course through various routes found in the open world. In versus mode, it is possible to race on tracks for three laps like in previous Mario Kart games. Mario Kart World features some past courses from the series that have been reimagined to fit the game's open-world design. In addition, a new mode called Knockout Tour is introduced in the game; the 24 racers compete in one much longer race spanning the game's world, with the last four racers eliminated at each of the six intermittent checkpoints. Mirror Mode, which horizontally inverts the entire map, also returns from the previous games.

Battle Mode returns from previous games; players compete against one another to become the last player standing in Balloon Battle and Bob-omb Blast, or collect the most coins in Coin Runners. Another new mode called "Free Roam" is introduced in World; players are permitted to drive to any location in the game's open-world (with Rainbow Road as the sole exception), including those that are off-road or outside of race tracks. Numerous missions, a feature returning from Mario Kart DS (2005), are present in this mode in addition to other collectables.

== Development and release ==
"If the idea had just been to add more courses, then I think we would've called it Mario Kart 9. But, that wasn't our approach this time. We wanted to take the series to the next level. So, we decided to drop the numbering this time and go with a completely new title, Mario Kart World."

— Producer Kosuke Yabuki on the game's title
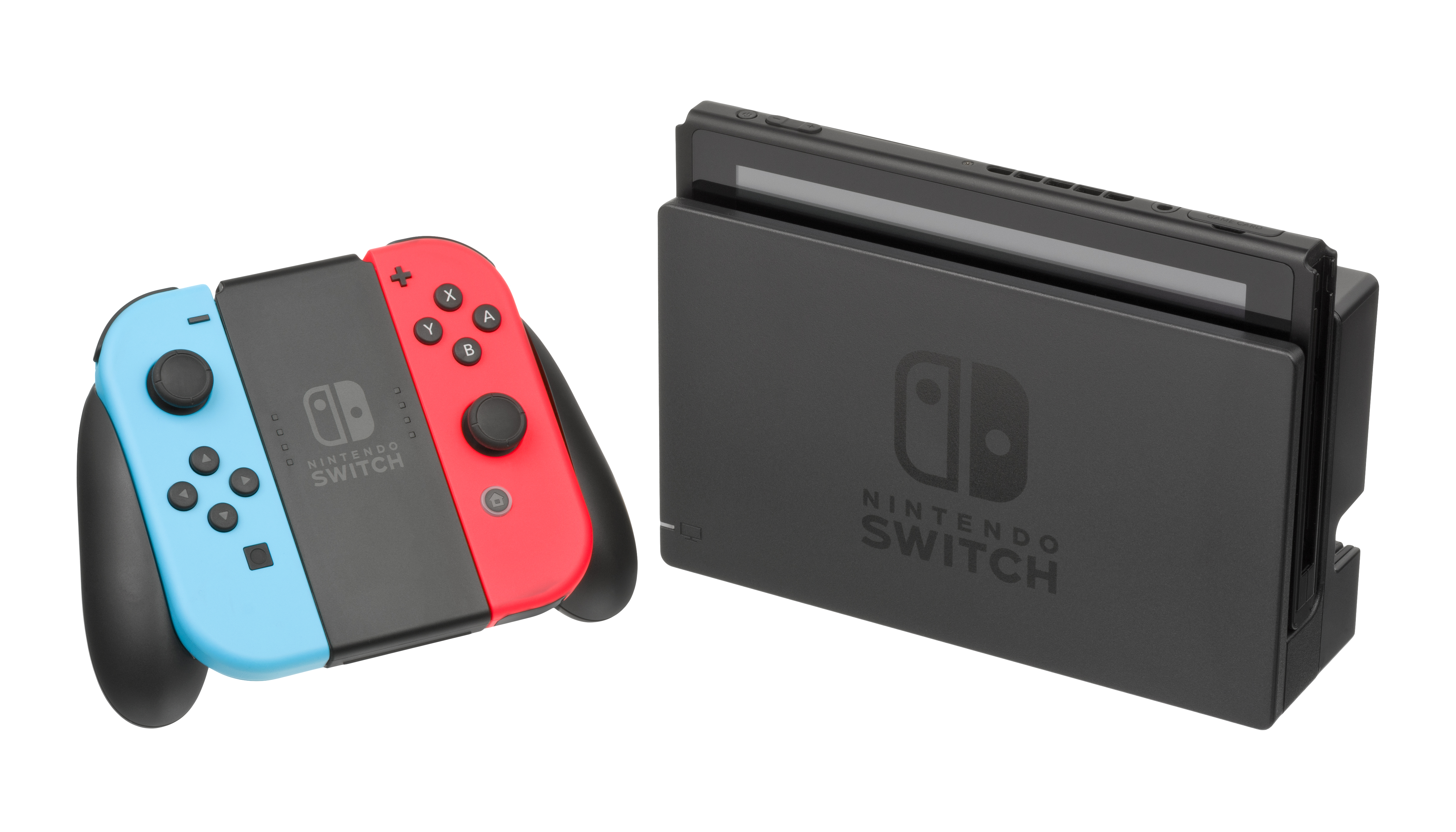
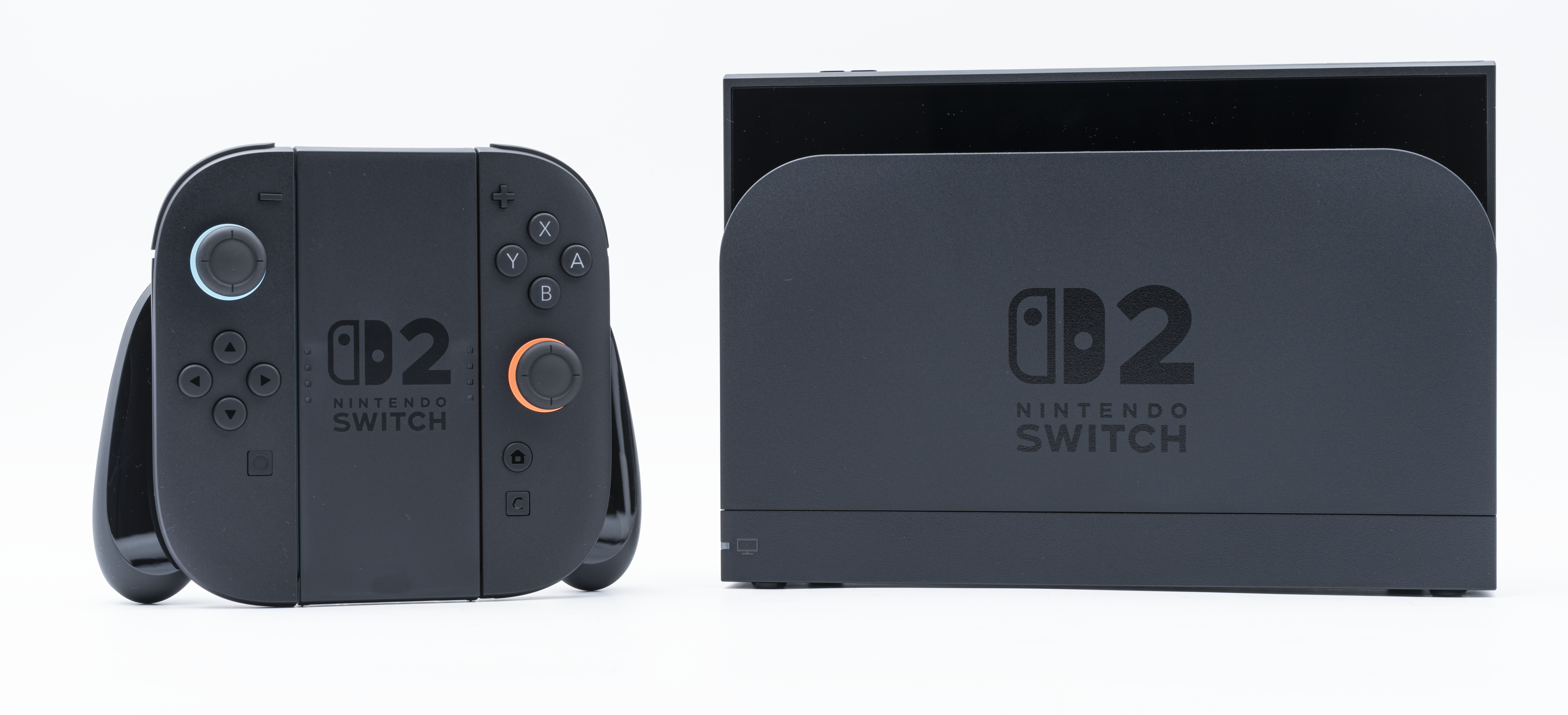
Mario Kart World entered development on the original Nintendo Switch (top) before shifting to the Switch 2 (bottom).

Nintendo began prototyping Mario Kart World for the Nintendo Switch in March 2017, just before the release of Mario Kart 8 Deluxe. At the end of that year, Nintendo Entertainment Planning & Development (EPD) officially began development on the game. Kosuke Yabuki, series producer, wanted the new entry to innovate on the series' gameplay formula with an open world, as he thought the traditional gameplay formula had been perfected with Mario Kart 8 Deluxe. The game was titled Mario Kart World instead of Mario Kart 9 since the early stages of development; the developers intended for it to be a completely new approach. Most of the new playable characters also exist as obstacles on the game's tracks; according to art director Masaaki Ishikawa, one of the designers sketched a Cow, who was an obstacle in previous games, driving a truck, leading to many of the course's other obstacles becoming NPC drivers.

In 2020, development was moved to the Nintendo Switch 2 after problems arose when trying to optimize an open-world racing game with 24 players on the original Switch hardware. The Switch 2's hardware specifications were beginning to take shape and gave the developers room to expand on their ideas. The "Booster Course Pass" downloadable content for Mario Kart 8 Deluxe was also conceived around this time, as a stopgap release to allow development on World to be prolonged.

=== Music ===
The soundtrack was composed by Nintendo's music team, led by Atsuko Asahi, who also worked on the music in Mario Kart 8 (2014). She was joined by Maasa Miyoshi, Takuhiro Honda, and Yutaro Takakuwa. For the first time in the series, Nintendo collaborated with external composers to arrange portions of the score, including members of the jazz fusion band Dezolve. In addition, Satoshi Bandoh and Masato Honda from T-Square contributed drums and wind instrument overdubs, respectively.

Mario Kart World introduced dynamic music transitions tailored to the player's progression through various game modes. According to Asahi, course themes were designed with dedicated intros and outros to create smooth transitions between tracks in the Knockout Tour mode, where players race continuously through multiple environments. The music was structured to build anticipation as players approach each course, transitioning seamlessly and creating a medley-like experience. For open-ended modes such as Free Roam, the team implemented a system internally referred to as the "jukebox", which automatically selects and plays from a large library of rearranged tracks. Over 200 original arrangements were created for this system, many of which are new interpretations of themes from past Mario games spanning various musical styles.

Tracks from Mario Kart World's soundtrack—including those from the game's tracks, modes and menus—were added to Nintendo Music on June 1, 2026. Tracks from Free Roam were added regularly to the service through the summer of 2026 by Nintendo, and were all combined in a playlist titled "Free Roam".

=== Release ===
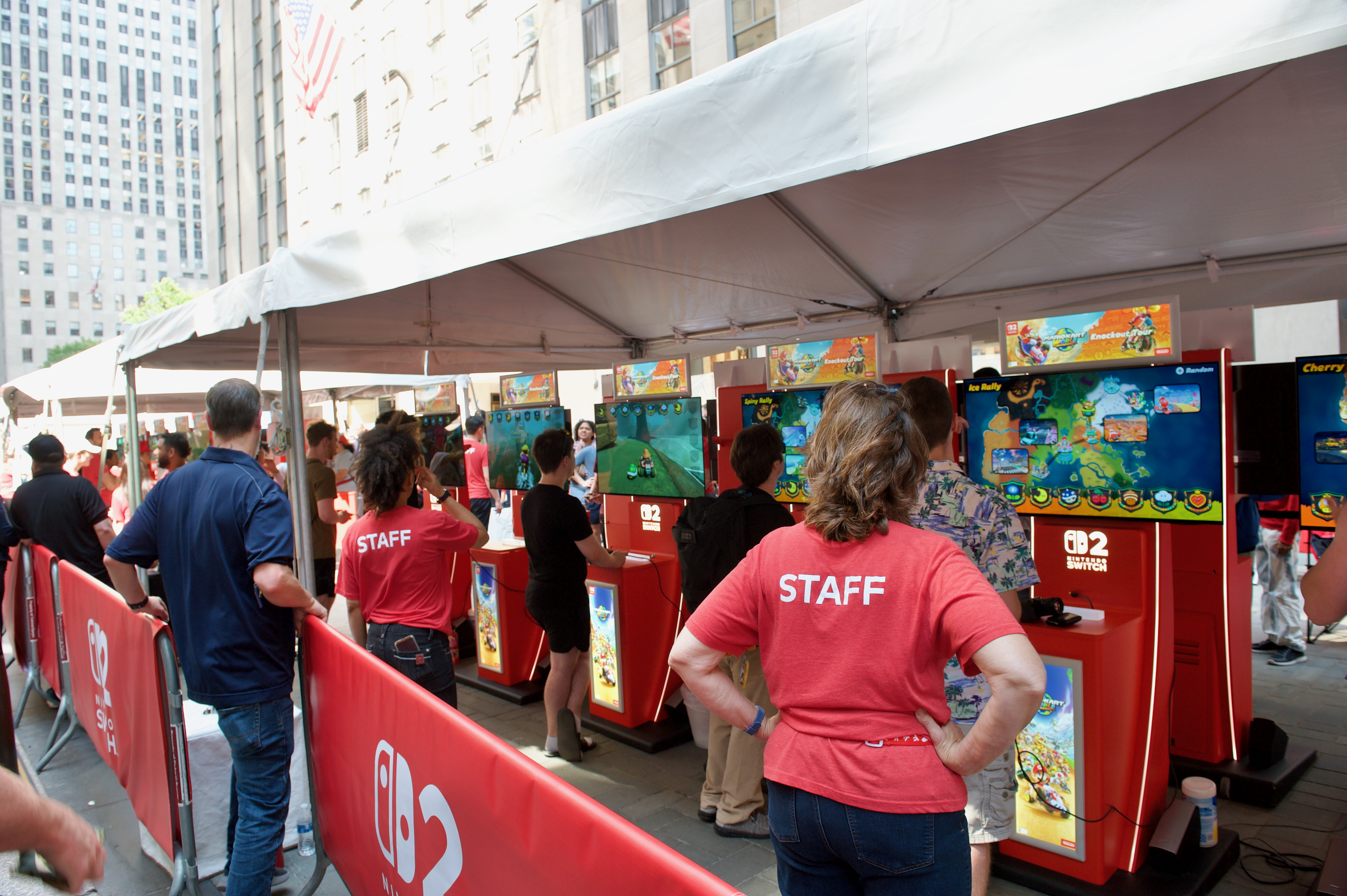
People playing Mario Kart World at the Nintendo Switch 2 launch event in New York City

On January 16, 2025, Nintendo revealed the Nintendo Switch 2 with footage of Mario Kart World. In a Nintendo Direct presentation on April 2, 2025, Nintendo announced the title Mario Kart World and revealed the first trailer. Nintendo announced that it would sell for US$79.99, $20 more than the standard price for games on the original Nintendo Switch and more than most standard editions of AAA games, which led to criticism. Nintendo held a Mario Kart World Direct presentation on April 17. Mario Kart World was released in most regions on June 5 as a launch game for the Nintendo Switch 2.

After launch the game has continued to receive regular content updates. Additions include item options for versus mode, changes to various routes in the southern region of the map, the Bob-omb Blast battle mode, new Knockout Tour rallies, and the ability to play courses from Super Mario Kart (1992) found in the world map in versus mode.

== Reception ==
Reception

Aggregate scores
| Aggregator | Score |
|---|---|
| Metacritic | 86/100 (Note: Score based on 132 reviews) |
| OpenCritic | 97% recommend (Note: Score based on 148 reviews) |

Review scores
| Publication | Score |
|---|---|
| 4Players | 8.5/10 |
| Destructoid | 9/10 |
| Digital Trends | 4/5 |
| Edge | 8/10 |
| Eurogamer | 4/5 |
| Famitsu | 9/10, 9/10, 9/10, 9/10 |
| Game Informer | 8.25/10 |
| Gamekult | 7/10 |
| GameSpot | 9/10 |
| GamesRadar+ | 4.5/5 |
| GameStar | 85/100 |
| IGN | 8/10 |
| Jeuxvideo.com | 17/20 |
| Nintendo Life | 9/10 |
| Nintendo World Report | 8/10 |
| PCMag | 4.5/5 |
| The Guardian | 5/5 |
| Video Games Chronicle | 4/5 |

Mario Kart World received "generally favorable" reviews according to the review aggregation website Metacritic, and 97% of critics recommended the game according to OpenCritic. All four critics from the Japanese magazine Famitsu gave it 9 out of 10, for a total score of 36 out of 40.

Logan Plant from IGN praised Mario Kart World for its polished gameplay and controls, "celebratory" soundtrack, new mechanics, and the Knockout Tour mode. He criticized its "online multiplayer limitations", several "design decisions around the interface and unlockables", and the free roam for its "uneven" execution. He expressed optimism toward future updates. Destructoid wrote that it was a "hallmark of excellence" and that it "may be the best game in the Mario Kart franchise", praising the Knockout Tour mode, open-world exploration, and unlockable content. PCMag described it as "a generational leap forward for the series". GameSpot praised the new features and gameplay elements, and said the version of Rainbow Road was "an all-time great". The Guardian's Keza MacDonald praised the "broad and ridiculous" selection of racers. Edge called the game's free-roam challenges "decent but unexceptional", but said that they were a good exercise of the driving mechanic, offering something to preoccupy the player's "canine instinct" of quest-completing while waiting for a friend to join the online lobby.

Some criticism was directed at the lack of local co-op multiplayer for the newly-introduced free roam mode, a feature previously reported to be in the game. Reception was mixed regarding the "Route" courses that connect the racetracks, particularly in online play. Before the version 1.1.2 update, online player lobbies favored the "random" gameplay option, which offered traditional three-lap games around one of the 30 courses; after the 1.1.2 update, the 202 route courses were added to the "random" option. The update led to the option disproportionately favoring the route courses, leading to player backlash and review bombs on Metacritic. This issue was slightly reverted in September 2025 with the 1.3.0 update, along with making it easier to unlock characters. Yussef Cole, writing for The New York Times, said that the game is "elegant, but mostly empty of anything terribly meaningful" and that its Free Roam mode does not compete with other open-world racing games such as Forza Horizon (2012) or Burnout Paradise (2008).

=== Sales ===
Famitsu reported that Mario Kart World sold 782,566 physical copies in Japan within four days. As of August 31, 2025, it had sold 1,655,926 physical copies in Japan. According to Circana, it was sold with about 79% of the 1.1 million Switch 2 sales in the United States, with around 869,000 copies being sold physically or as part of the console bundle. It also sold about 95,000 copies in Spain. Mario Kart World was the best-selling game on the Nintendo eShop sales charts as of June 2025. As of September 30, 2026, Mario Kart World is the best-selling Switch 2 game, selling 16.48 million copies worldwide.

=== Accolades ===
Awards and nominations
| Year | Ceremony | Category | Result | Ref. |
|---|---|---|---|---|
| 2025 | Gamescom | Best Gameplay | Nominated | |
| 2025 | Gamescom | Most Entertaining | Nominated | |
| 2025 | Gamescom | Best Nintendo Switch 2 Game | Won | |
| 2025 | Golden Joystick Award | Best Multiplayer Game | Nominated | |
| 2025 | Golden Joystick Award | Console Game of the Year | Nominated | |
| 2025 | Thailand Game Awards | Best Sports Game | Won | |
| 2025 | The Game Awards 2025 | Best Family Game | Nominated | |
| 2025 | The Game Awards 2025 | Best Sports/Racing Game | Won | |
| 2026 | 15th New York Game Awards | Tin Pan Alley Award for Best Music in a Game | Nominated | |
| 2026 | 29th Annual D.I.C.E. Awards | Online Game of the Year | Nominated | |
| 2026 | 29th Annual D.I.C.E. Awards | Racing Game of the Year | Won | |
| 2026 | 29th Annual D.I.C.E. Awards | Outstanding Achievement in Original Music Composition | Nominated | |
| 2026 | 22nd British Academy Games Awards | Family | Nominated | |
| 2026 | 22nd British Academy Games Awards | Multiplayer | Longlisted | |
