= Kirby & the Amazing Mirror =

2004 video game

- North American box art
- Developers: HAL Laboratory; Flagship; Dimps
- Publisher: Nintendo
- Director: Tomoaki Fukui
- Producers: Yasushi Adachi; Masayoshi Tanimura; Shigeru Miyamoto; Kenji Miki
- Composers: Hironobu Inagaki; Atsuyoshi Isemura
- Series: Kirby
- Platform: Game Boy Advance
- Release: JP: April 15, 2004; EU: July 2, 2004; NA: October 18, 2004; AU: December 23, 2004
- Genres: Platform, Metroidvania
- Modes: Single-player; Multiplayer

Kirby & The Amazing Mirror (Note: Known in Japan as Hoshi no Kirby: Kagami no Daimeikyū (Japanese: 星のカービィ 鏡の大迷宮, Hepburn: Hoshi no Kābī Kagami no Daimeikyū; lit. Kirby of the Stars: The Great Mirror Labyrinth)) is a 2004 platform game developed by HAL Laboratory, Flagship and Dimps and published by Nintendo for the Game Boy Advance. The seventh mainline Kirby entry, the game is notable for its unique Metroidvania playstyle and being the first in the series to support cooperative four-player multiplayer, and follows Kirby as he goes on a journey through the Mirror Dimension to reassemble a mirror after Dark Meta Knight traps Meta Knight inside it.

== Gameplay ==
Kirby and his different colored copies in the hub world

Unlike the other Kirby games, Kirby & The Amazing Mirror features a nonlinear design, and is traversed in a Metroidvania style. The Mirror World is divided into nine themed areas. The player begins in an over-world with doors that connect to a few other areas. From there the game map branches out in several directions and, providing Kirby has the proper power at his disposal, he is able to go anywhere in almost any order, excluding the final sequence.

The player explores the Mirror World, solving puzzles, defeating enemies, and collecting items. Occasionally, a sub-boss will be encountered, at which point the screen will lock into place until the boss is defeated. Swallowing a sub-boss after defeat usually grants a rare or exclusive copy ability. Apart from the first, each area of the game houses a major boss who possesses a shard from the broken Dimension Mirror that sits in the center of the hub world. The player must defeat these bosses and reclaim all eight shards to re-assemble the Dimension Mirror, which leads to the final boss.

The player can collect various items to improve in-game performance, such as extra health points and lives, food to replenish health, and batteries for the Cellphone. The game also features two other collectibles: music sheets, which act as a sound test mode once the music player item is found, and spray paint, which can be used to recolor the player's Kirby. There are also three minigames accessible from the menu, which support single player and multiplayer:

- Speed Eaters – A game in which the four Kirbys are seated around a covered platter. Once the lid is whisked away at a random time, the fastest person to press the A button and suck in the food on the platter is filled up more (measured by a gauge above each Kirby).
- Crackity Hack – A game in which the four Kirbys are challenged to break a rock as much as they can, in a similar style to a microgame from Kirby Super Star.
- Kirby's Wave Ride – A game in which the Kirbys, atop Warp Stars, race over a water track that varies in length and complexity depending on the difficulty setting, similar to the GameCube racing game Kirby Air Ride.

The game also features multiplayer, and the player can call other players or CPU-controlled Kirbys to the location with an in-game cell phone. There are several new powers in The Amazing Mirror, such as Cupid (called Angel in the Japanese version), which allows Kirby to fly around with wings and a halo and fire arrows; Missile, which turns Kirby into a missile that can be guided in any direction and will explode on contact with a wall or an enemy or when the B button is hit; and Smash, which gives Kirby the abilities he had in Super Smash Bros. Melee.

== Plot ==
There is a Mirror World that exists in the skies of Dream Land where any wish reflected in the mirror will come true. However, it copies the mind of a mysterious figure one day and creates a reflected world of evil. Meta Knight notices this and flies up to investigate whether this world will cause any harm to Dream Land.

Meanwhile, Kirby is taking a walk when Dark Meta Knight appears. Before Kirby can react, Dark Meta Knight slices Kirby into four different colored Kirbys. They chase after Dark Meta Knight on a Warp Star simultaneously and enter the Mirror World.

It is revealed that the two Meta Knights fought each other until the real Meta Knight was defeated. He was then knocked into the Dimension Mirror, which was in turn cut into eight fragments by Dark Meta Knight and scattered across the Mirror World, prompting the Kirbys to save Meta Knight and the Mirror World. After collecting all eight mirror fragments, Kirby enters the Dimension Mirror and battles Dark Meta Knight. After defeating him, Kirby is armed with the real Meta Knight's Master Sword and taken to fight Dark Mind, the true mastermind behind the Mirror World's corruption, multiple times. Upon defeat, the Mirror World is saved, and Shadow Kirby (the Mirror World counterpart of Kirby who was believed to be an enemy, but is now an ally) waves his goodbyes to the four Kirbys as they all exit the Mirror World one by one. Meta Knight also drops his Master Sword before leaving the Mirror World, marking it as a symbol for the Mirror World's protection.

== Development ==
The game is a collaboration between HAL Laboratory, Flagship, and Dimps. Capcom's subsidiary Flagship was responsible for the main planning. Dimps was in charge of programming, design, and sound, while HAL Laboratory provided artwork and debugging services. The game features soundtrack by Hironobu Inagaki and Atsuyoshi Isemura, but some tracks were reserved from Kirby: Nightmare in Dream Land.

== Release ==
Kirby & The Amazing Mirror was released for the Game Boy Advance in Japan on April 15, 2004, followed by the region of Europe on July 2, 2004, North America on October 18, 2004, and Australia on December 23, 2004.

=== Re-releases ===
On August 1, 2011, Nintendo announced that Kirby & The Amazing Mirror would be available to limited Nintendo 3DS owners via Virtual Console, along with nine other Game Boy Advance games that were announced; it was released on December 16, 2011, to join the upcoming Nintendo 3DS price-cut and the Ambassador program starting August 11, 2011. This offer is available in all territories and only to those who became eligible in the Ambassador program (by accessing the Nintendo eShop before the date of the price-cut). Nintendo did not release this game, or any other Game Boy Advance games, to the general public in paid form on the 3DS.

The game was also released on the Wii U's Virtual Console on April 3, 2014, in Japan and April 10, 2014, in North America, Europe, and Australia, and on the Nintendo Classics service on September 29, 2023, which supports online multiplayer.

== Reception ==
=== Critical response ===
Reception

Aggregate score
Aggregator	Score
Metacritic	80/100

Review scores
Publication	Score
1Up.com	B+
Famitsu	36/40
Game Informer	7.75/10
GameSpot	8.2/10
GameSpy	4/5
IGN	8/10
Nintendo Life	6/10
Nintendo Power	4/5
VideoGamer.com	7/10
X-Play	3/5
The Times	4/5

The Amazing Mirror received "generally favorable" reviews according to the review aggregation website Metacritic. In Japan, four critics from Famitsu gave the game a total score of 36 out of 40. It received a runner-up position in GameSpot's 2004 "Best Game Boy Advance Game" and "Best Platformer" award categories, losing to Astro Boy: Omega Factor and Ratchet & Clank: Up Your Arsenal, respectively.

IGN commented on the level design, stating that discovering the hidden pathways is the real challenge." GameSpot called the layout "daunting," but commented on the map feature. The graphics and sound were referred to as cute, though not amazing.

=== Sales ===
In the United States, Kirby & The Amazing Mirror sold 620,000 copies and earned $19 million by August 2006. During the period between January 2000 and August 2006, it was the 43rd highest-selling game launched for the Game Boy Advance, Nintendo DS, or PlayStation Portable in that country. The game ended up selling 1.47 million copies worldwide, making it the 26th-best-selling game for the Game Boy Advance.
