= Kirby Super Star =

1996 video game

- North American box art featuring Kirby with the beam copy ability
- Developer: HAL Laboratory
- Publisher: Nintendo
- Director: Masahiro Sakurai
- Producers: Satoru Iwata; Shigeru Miyamoto
- Programmer: Shigenobu Kasai
- Artist: Tsuyoshi Wakayama
- Composer: Jun Ishikawa
- Series: Kirby
- Platform: Super Nintendo Entertainment System
- Release: JP: March 21, 1996; NA: September 20, 1996; PAL: January 23, 1997
- Genre: Platform
- Modes: Single-player, multiplayer

Kirby Super Star, (Note: Released in Japan as Hoshi no Kirby Super Deluxe (星のカービィスーパーデラックス, Hoshi no Kābī Sūpā Derakkusu; Kirby of the Stars Super Deluxe)) released as Kirby's Fun Pak in PAL regions, is a 1996 anthology platform game developed by HAL Laboratory and published by Nintendo for the Super Nintendo Entertainment System. It is part of the Kirby series of video games by HAL Laboratory. The game was advertised as a compilation featuring nine games: seven short subsections with the same basic gameplay, and two minigames. Games and minigames include: Spring Breeze, Dyna Blade, Gourmet Race, Milky Way Wishes, The Great Cave Offensive, The Arena, Revenge Of Meta Knight, Megaton Punch, and Samurai Kirby.

An enhanced remake titled Kirby Super Star Ultra was released for the Nintendo DS in 2008 and 2009 to commercial and critical success, selling just under 3 million copies. The original game has also been digitally rereleased multiple times.

== Gameplay ==
Kirby Super Star is a side-scrolling platform game. Similar to previous entries in the Kirby series, the player controls the titular character Kirby to complete various levels while avoiding obstacles and enemies. Kirby can walk or run, jump, swim, crouch, slide, and inhale enemies or objects to spit them out as bullets. He can fly for a limited time by inflating himself; while flying, Kirby cannot attack or use his other abilities, though he can release a weak puff of air. By eating certain enemies, Kirby can gain copy abilities, power-ups allowing him to take on the properties the enemy possessed. In Kirby Super Star, Kirby gains the ability to guard so he can defend himself from weak attacks.

If Kirby uses a copy ability, he can produce a Helper, a character that can be controlled automatically or by another player. Like Kirby, Helpers can float continuously, but can only use the copy ability they were based on. The player can also grant the Helper a different form or revert them into a power-up in an emergency. The player characters lose health if they are hit by enemies or hazards. If the Helper loses all their health, there is a short time for Kirby to grant it a new power before it disappears. If Kirby loses all of his health, the player will lose a life. Health can be replenished by eating food scattered across levels. Losing all lives results in a game over.

=== Game modes ===
Cutter Kirby (center middle) and Rocky (center right), fighting Dyna Blade (top right) in the unlockable game The Arena. Character health bars are displayed on the lower portion of the screen.

Kirby Super Star is split into seven smaller games, six primary and one supplemental, in addition to two minigames. While most retain the same game mechanics, they have different stories and objectives. Some games must be unlocked by playing others, and all must be finished to complete the game.

- Spring Breeze: an abridged remake of the first Kirby game, Kirby's Dream Land (1992), with the gameplay enhancements of Kirby Super Star. King Dedede has stolen food from the citizens of Dream Land, and Kirby must reach the King's castle to challenge him. Several levels from the original have been merged, while some boss fights were cut.
- Dyna Blade: Kirby must stop Dyna Blade, a giant bird, from disturbing Dream Land's crops. The mode consists of four levels that the player must clear before facing off against Dyna Blade. There are also two secret areas and a mini-boss that moves across the world map.
- Gourmet Race: a racing game in which Kirby races King Dedede while eating as much food as possible. It takes place across three levels of varying length. Players earn points from eating food and bonus points for finishing first in a race; whoever earns the most points by the end of all levels wins. Players can choose to race either King Dedede or a "ghost" (the player's best attempt at the race), or simply race alone for the fastest time.
- The Great Cave Offensive: a Metroidvania adventure that sees Kirby explore a cave that he has fallen into for treasure. Sixty treasure chests are hidden across four areas. Some treasures reference other Nintendo franchises, such as the Triforce (The Legend of Zelda), Captain Falcon's helmet (F-Zero), and Mr. Saturn (EarthBound); others reference valuable items that appear in role-playing video games, such as Orichalcum.
- Revenge of Meta Knight: a story-driven mode chronicling Kirby's efforts to stop Meta Knight, who attempts to take over Dream Land and end the inhabitants' "lazy" lifestyle by invading in his signature airship, the Halberd. Each level has a time limit, and Kirby will lose a life if the player does not finish in time. The Halberd takes damage after every level, and a meter at the bottom of the screen shows the ship's status. The player fights numerous bosses, and the mode culminates in a chase to escape the falling Halberd.
- Milky Way Wishes: the largest mode in the game. Because the Sun and Moon around planet Popstar are fighting, a jester named Marx tells Kirby he must travel across nine planets and restore the giant wish-granting comet-clock Nova. In the end, Marx—who masterminded the conflict—wishes to Nova to control Popstar, but Kirby stops him. Unlike the other modes, Kirby cannot use copy abilities; instead, he collects "Copy Essence Deluxes". Once in Kirby's possession, they allow the player to select a copy ability from a list and are kept permanently. The mode also features scrolling shooter levels.
- The Arena: a boss attack mode that challenges the player to fight every boss in the game with only one life and a free selection of power-up at the start of the game. The player can replenish their health up to five times total between rounds, and are granted two power-ups at random. Completing The Arena unlocks a sound test.
- Sub-games: two minigames that can be played single-player or multiplayer. They include Samurai Kirby, in which the player must be the first to press a button after a prompt, similar to Wild Gunman (1984); and Megaton Punch, in which the player must accurately time three button presses to throw a stronger punch than their opponent.

== Development ==
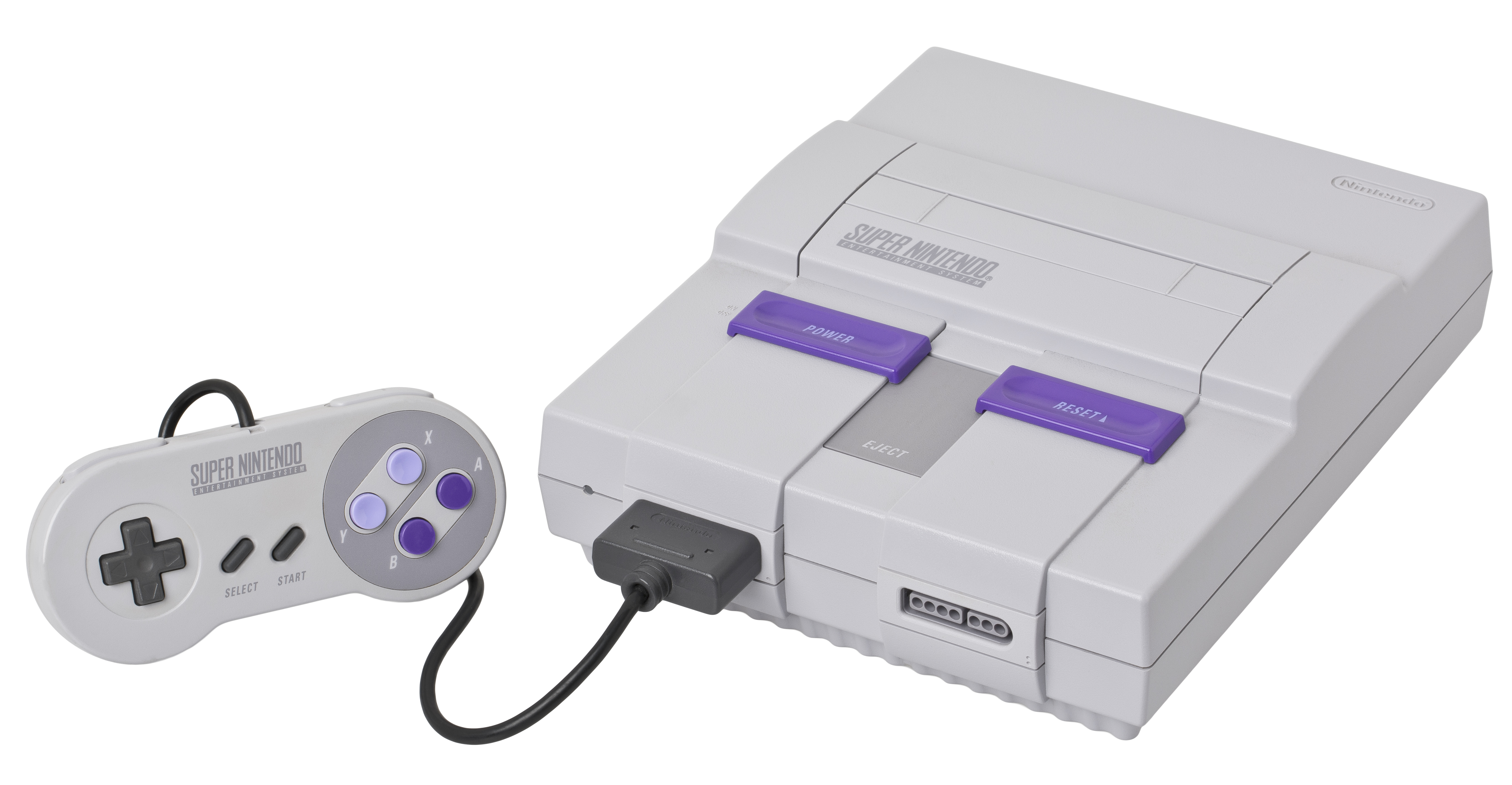
Development on Kirby Super Star lasted longer than usual for the era, and as a result it released late in the Super Nintendo Entertainment System's (pictured) life cycle.

Kirby Super Star was developed in Japan by HAL Laboratory and directed by Kirby creator Masahiro Sakurai. It was the third Kirby game he directed, following Kirby's Dream Land and Kirby's Adventure. Although a Super Nintendo Entertainment System (SNES) title, the Kirby Super Star prototype was developed for the original Nintendo Entertainment System. According to Sakurai, although the prototype was for internal use only, it was almost complete and some of Kirby's animations were nearly identical in the final game. The prototype was used to test out ideas before implementing them in the final product; Sakurai said having the game operating on an internal build made it easier to develop ideas. HAL president Satoru Iwata had little involvement with the game, and left development under Sakurai's supervision.

For Kirby Super Star, Sakurai "had three pillars in mind. One was two-player cooperative gameplay and another was including actions similar to those in fighting games. The third was an omnibus format." The addition of cooperative gameplay was something Shigeru Miyamoto requested. While Sakurai knew a SNES Kirby game would mean bigger, more detailed characters and graphics, he wanted to hear from Miyamoto before thinking about the foundation and other important aspects. Sakurai and Iwata traveled to Kyoto; there, Miyamoto told them he wanted cooperative gameplay, something uncommon in side-scrolling platform games. Miyamoto had dreamed of creating a cooperative game in his Super Mario franchise for many years, but was unable to until New Super Mario Bros. Wii in 2009 because of how fast the series' gameplay is. Kirby, on the other hand, is slower-paced, so Miyamoto figured it would be possible. Sakurai thought about it and came up with the idea to have a main player and an assisting one; this led to the conception of Helpers, which he thought opened the door for inexperienced players.

As for why I made it an "omnibus," I did it because I thought we were seeing too many games that took too long to beat. At the time, more and more massive games kept hitting the market. And they all took a long time to finish. By creating an "omnibus" collection of quick-to-beat individual scenarios, each complete with their own unique gameplay, I thought I could provide a lot of content without causing players to grow tired of any one style.

— Masahiro Sakurai (translated)

As for including fighting game-like moves, Sakurai made enemies stronger. He did this because "[t]he main player would simply hurl blades and lay waste to opponents while the Helper just watched." Additionally, he expanded copy abilities' possibilities so players could perform multiple actions by pressing the same button, similar to fighting games. The game was also the first in the series in which Kirby's appearance changed depending on his copy ability. The omnibus format was chosen because Sakurai noted most SNES and some NES games were of considerable length, and prices were high. Kirby Super Star served as "the antithesis to that trend," with Sakurai hoping to create sections with different stories and gameplay that appealed to both experienced and inexperienced players. Spring Breeze, a remake of Kirby's Dream Land, was designed for beginners and is thus Super Star's first mode. The title is a quote from the Dream Land manual that "describe[s] Kirby as a youth who came with the spring breeze," and was chosen to signify its simplicity. Originally, Sakurai was going to remove copy abilities to remain faithful to the original game while teaching beginners how to play, but ultimately did not.

The Japanese packaging of Kirby Super Star was modeled after a traditional Japanese Paulownia wooden box.

Development lasted three years, longer than usual for the era. This was partially due to the influence of Rare's Donkey Kong Country (1994), a game that incorporated computer-generated (CG) graphics. Sakurai was certain using CG would be beneficial, so the team redid the artwork about halfway through development. HAL's development schedule also lengthened development. Sakurai planned to include an additional game mode, Kagero Mansion, which was discarded due to time constraints. Kagero Mansion was a horror game with an emphasis on action and puzzle elements; it saw Kirby stuck in a mansion and unable to inhale. HAL also planned to add a move that allowed Kirby to create an explosion from guarding, but cut the idea. The game's working title was Kirby of the Stars: Active, which "suggest[ed] that the game was more proactive and had more active gameplay." Mother series creator Shigesato Itoi came up with the final title, which Sakurai said "convey[s] how rich it is in content".

== Release ==
Kirby Super Star was one of the last SNES games, released just three months before the launch of the system's successor, the Nintendo 64. Publisher Nintendo released the game in Japan on March 21, 1996, in North America on September 20, 1996, and in Europe on January 23, 1997. In Japan, the title is Kirby of the Stars: Super Deluxe, while in Europe, it is Kirby's Fun Pak. The Japanese packaging was designed to resemble a Paulownia wooden box, an idea that originated from Itoi. In Japan, expensive sake and silverware is often sold in Paulownia boxes; the team thought the packaging would convey that the game was special. While noting that it seems unrelated to the game, Sakurai commented that this cover illustrated the heart of Kirby Super Star and praised Itoi's idea.

Kirby Super Star was rereleased on the Wii and Wii U via Nintendo's Virtual Console digital distribution service. The Wii version was released in Japan in October 2009 and in the West in May 2010, and the Wii U version was released worldwide in May 2013. The game was also included in Kirby's Dream Collection (2012), a 20th anniversary compilation of Kirby titles for the Wii. Kirby Super Star is also included in the Super NES Classic Edition. Nintendo released the game on the Super Nintendo Entertainment System app via its Nintendo Classics service on December 12, 2019. A special version with the secret modes unlocked was later released on June 9, 2022.

== Reception ==
Reception

Aggregate score
| Aggregator | Score |
|---|---|
| GameRankings | 85.74% |

Review scores
| Publication | Score |
|---|---|
| Computer and Video Games | 3/5 |
| Electronic Gaming Monthly | 9/10, 8.5/10, 9/10, 8/10 |
| EP Daily | 8.5/10 |
| Famitsu | 9/10, 8/10, 7/10, 8/10 |
| Game Informer | 7.25/10 |
| GamesMaster | 88/100 |
| Hyper | 86% |
| IGN | 8.5/10 |
| Nintendo Life | 9/10, 8/10 |
| Official Nintendo Magazine | 72/100 |
| Super Play | 89% |
| Total! | (UK) 83/100 (DE) 1- |
| Nintendo Magazine System | 79/100 |

The Japanese publication Micom BASIC Magazine ranked Kirby Super Star seventh in popularity in its June 1996 issue. The game received generally favorable reception from critics, holding a rating of 85.74% based on seven reviews according to review aggregator platform GameRankings. The four-person review team of Electronic Gaming Monthly (EGM) applauded the large amount of content, simultaneous two-player mode, graphics, and Kirby's power-absorbing ability. EGM named Kirby Super Star a runner-up for Side-Scrolling Game of the Year (behind Guardian Heroes). GamePro's Captain Cameron ommented that "The perfect execution of the varied controls leads to simple-but-charming fun".

=== Sales and accolades ===
In Japan, Kirby Super Star was a commercial success, selling 141,621 copies in its first week on the market and ended the year with 563,806 copies sold. According to the 2021 CESA Games White Papers book, the game sold 1,440,000 copies, making it one of the best-selling SNES titles. In retrospectives, it has been listed among the best SNES games by IGN, GamesRadar, and Complex.

== Legacy ==
Kirby Super Star was given an enhanced remake in the form of Kirby Super Star Ultra to celebrate the series' 15th anniversary. The remake retains all game modes found in the original and adds four major new ones, along with adding updated visuals and full-motion video cutscenes.

The remake features four new modes, three new minigames, and multiple additions to the base game including new sub-bosses and enemies. The remake was released in North America on September 22, 2008, to critical and commercial success, selling just under three million copies worldwide.

Many of the music tracks in Kirby Super Star have been remixed in various games, such as the Super Smash Bros. series; the Nintendo 64 game, for instance, had a new version of the Gourmet Race theme as Kirby's theme song.

Meta Knight's battleship, the Halberd, would reappear in several games such as Kirby: Squeak Squad, Kirby's Epic Yarn, Kirby: Planet Robobot, and the Super Smash Bros. series.

A stage based on The Great Cave Offensive appears in Super Smash Bros. for Wii U. In reference to the scope of the mode of the same name, the arena is amongst the largest stages in the game's catalog, and thus supports up to eight players. It features a unique mechanic dubbed the "Danger Zones", stage hazards that instantly KO any fighter whose damage percentages exceed 100%. The stage was also included in Super Smash Bros. Ultimate.

In 2021, Charlie Rosen and Jake Silverman arranged the composition "Meta Knight's Revenge" for The 8-Bit Big Band. Their cover was subsequently nominated for and won the Grammy Award for Best Arrangement, Instrumental or A Cappella.
