= Kirby: Squeak Squad =

2006 video game

- North American box art
- Developers: HAL Laboratory; Flagship; Natsume
- Publisher: Nintendo
- Director: Takashi Hamamura
- Producers: Yasushi Adachi; Masayoshi Tanimura; Kensuke Tanabe
- Composers: Hirokazu Ando; Jun Ishikawa; Tadashi Ikegami; Shogo Sakai
- Series: Kirby
- Platform: Nintendo DS
- Release: JP: November 2, 2006; NA: December 4, 2006; UK: December 8, 2006; AU: March 1, 2007; EU: June 22, 2007; KOR: September 13, 2007
- Genre: Platform
- Modes: Single-player, multiplayer

Kirby: Squeak Squad (Note: Japanese: 星のカービィ 参上! ドロッチェ団, Hepburn: Hoshi no Kābī Sanjō! Dorotche-dan; lit. Kirby of the Stars: Calling On! Daroach Gang) (Note: Known in Europe as Kirby: Mouse Attack) is a 2006 platform game developed by HAL Laboratory and Flagship and published by Nintendo for the Nintendo DS. It is one of the mainline installment entries of the Kirby series and the second Kirby game released for the system. The game was released in Japan and North America in 2006 and in Europe, Australia, and South Korea in 2007. The game was later re-released for the Wii U's Virtual Console on June 25, 2015.

== Gameplay ==
As in most of his games, Kirby is able to copy the abilities of certain enemies by inhaling and swallowing them. There are also interactive environments, with obstacles that are passable with copy abilities. Kirby is also able to collect and store copy abilities and items in his stomach, which is represented on the touch screen. Only five items can be stored at a time. The player can combine certain abilities, similar to Kirby 64: The Crystal Shards. Mixing abilities is achieved by dragging one ability over another with the stylus. If the two are compatible with each other, they will combine and produce a new ability. This can only be done if the scroll for a certain ability is found. However, if they are not compatible, they will combine to create a random bubble. The game also introduces Copy Scrolls, which power-up any Copy Ability that Kirby has when chosen.

Each level contains one or more treasure chests, with the contents being awarded when the player successfully completes the level with that chest. The player will need to make sure they have enough space in Kirby's stomach to store the chests. The larger chests are generally more difficult to obtain, and require Kirby to face a member of the Squeaks in a mini-challenge.

The game supports multiplayer for three special minigames based on the Squeak Squad. These minigames are Treasure Shot, Speedy Teatime, and Smash Ride, the latter of which appeared in Merry Magoland in Kirby's Return to Dream Land Deluxe.

== Plot ==
One day in Dream Land, Kirby attempts to eat a slice of strawberry shortcake. Before he can, however, it is suddenly snatched away by an unseen presence. Kirby immediately suspects King Dedede of committing the same crime again, so he leaves to go confront him. Finding Dedede at his castle in Prism Plains, Kirby defeats him in battle, but soon discovers Dedede was not responsible. Immediately after, a group of treasure-thieving mice known as the Squeaks appear. They reveal they were behind Kirby's shortcake being taken. As they flee with Dedede's belongings, an angered Dedede grabs Kirby and hurls him at the Squeaks. Kirby then chases the Squeaks across Dream Land, eventually reaching their hideout at Ice Island.

At Ice Island, a battle ensues between Kirby and the leader of the Squeaks, Daroach. Kirby wins the battle, and is about to get the treasure chest supposedly containing his cake when Meta Knight swoops in and snatches the chest away. Meta Knight escapes to the Secret Sea, and Kirby chases after him. Kirby catches up to Meta Knight, and they fight on the Halberd, which flies into space. Meta Knight is defeated and Kirby goes to the treasure chest. Before he can open it, though, Daroach flies in and grabs it from him. Daroach opens it, but the chest does not contain Kirby's cake. Instead, a dark-colored cloud emerges, possessing Daroach, who flies off to the distant Gamble Galaxy.

Concerned, Kirby follows, eventually encountering and fighting the possessed Daroach. Once beaten, the darkness lets go of Daroach and floats away in the form of a small, black-colored star. Kirby follows the star, which eventually transforms into its true form, Dark Nebula. It is revealed that the chest was Dark Nebula's prison, and Meta Knight was only trying to keep anyone from opening the chest and releasing Dark Nebula. Kirby defeats Dark Nebula and heads back to Dream Land. In a post-credits scene, the Squeaks send Kirby back his cake, making him happy at last as he begins to eat it.

== Reception ==
Reception

Aggregate score
Aggregator	Score
Metacritic	71/100

Review scores
Publication	Score
1Up.com	B−
Edge	7/10
Electronic Gaming Monthly	6.67/10
Eurogamer	6/10
Famitsu	31/40
Game Informer	7.75/10
GamePro	4/5
GameRevolution	C
GameSpot	7.7/10
GameSpy	3.5/5
GameTrailers	6.5/10
IGN	7.8/10
Nintendo Life	7/10
Nintendo Power	7.5/10
Official Nintendo Magazine	70%
X-Play	3/5
The Sydney Morning Herald	3.5/5

Kirby: Squeak Squad received "mixed or average" reviews according to the review aggregation website Metacritic. In Japan, four critics from Famitsu gave the game a total score of 31 out of 40.

Criticisms concerned the lack of originality in the title when compared to the previous Kirby game on the Nintendo DS, Kirby: Canvas Curse. Television show X-Play criticized the game for weak minigames and unnecessary use of the touchscreen. The British Official Nintendo Magazine gave the game, on its European release, a score of 70%.

IGN said that the game is "nothing spectacular if you look at it as a creative new way to experience the classic Kirby gameplay".

== Rerelease ==
The game was later released on the Wii U's Virtual Console service in Europe on June 25, 2015; in Australia on June 26, 2015; in North America on July 30, 2015; and in Japan on September 9, 2015. The Australian eShop received the European release, despite not being given the PAL name change.

== Notes ==
Known in Europe as Kirby: Mouse Attack (not Australia)
