= List of Kirby media =

Franchise list

Kirby
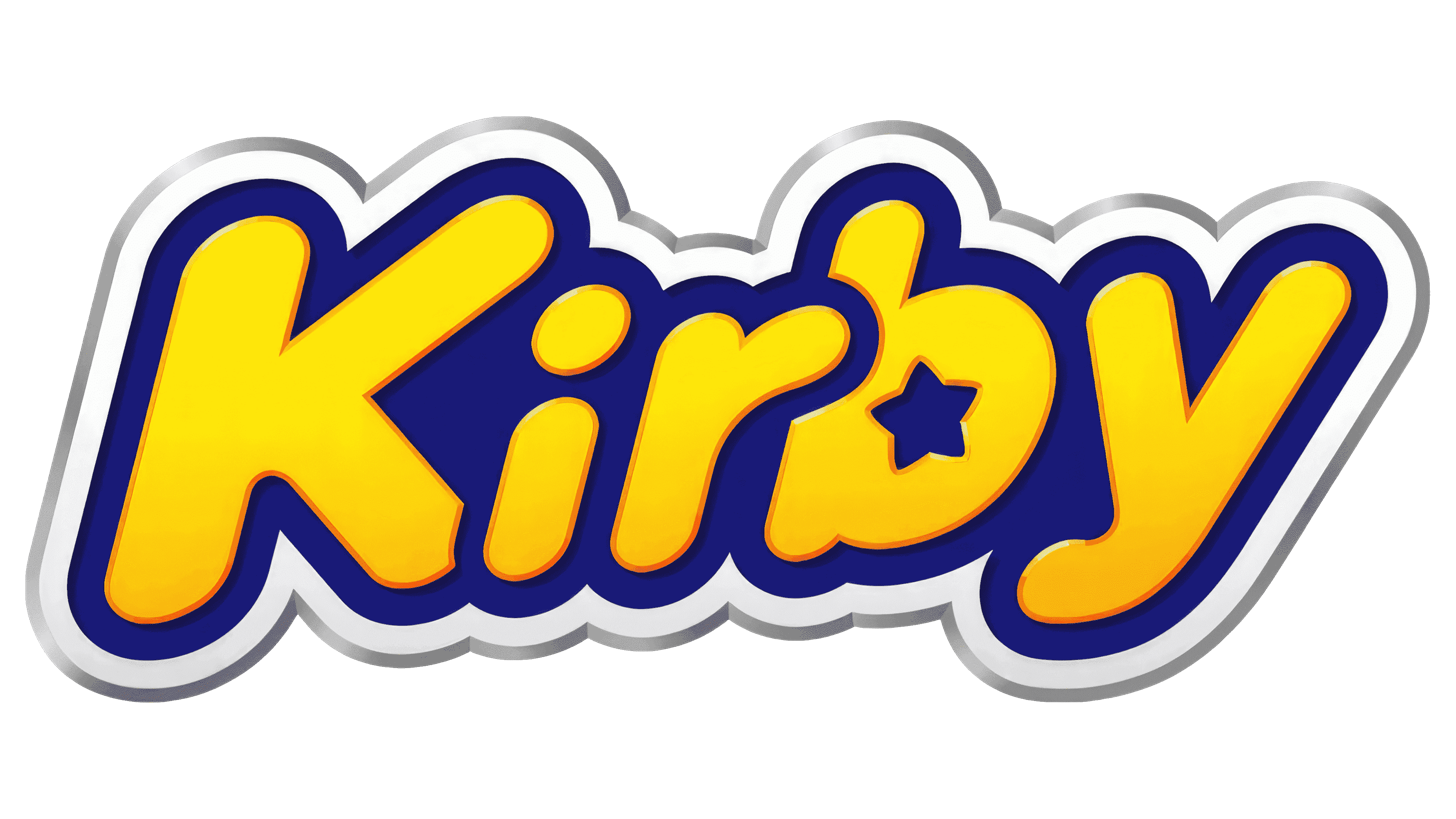
- Logo since 2022
- Genres: Platform: Pinball; Golf; Puzzle; Racing; Fighting; Rhythm
- Developers: HAL Laboratory: Good-Feel; Flagship; Dimps; Arika; Compile; Tose; Banpresto; Vanpool; Nintendo R&D1; Nintendo R&D2; Sora Ltd.; Bandai Namco Studios
- Publisher: Nintendo
- Creator: Masahiro Sakurai
- Platforms: Various: Game Boy; NES; SNES; Nintendo 64; Game Boy Color; GameCube; Game Boy Advance; Nintendo DS; Wii; Nintendo 3DS; Wii U; Nintendo Switch; Nintendo Switch 2
- First release: Kirby's Dream Land; April 27, 1992
- Latest release: Kirby Air Riders; November 20, 2025

Kirby (Note: Known in Japan as Hoshi no Kirby (星のカービィ, Hoshi no Kābī; lit. "Kirby of the Stars")) is a video game series that serves as a branch of the wider Kirby franchise owned by HAL Laboratory. The series centers around the adventures of the titular character as he fights to protect and save his home on the Planet Popstar from a variety of threats. The majority of the games are side-scrolling platformers with puzzle-solving and beat 'em up elements. Kirby has the ability to inhale enemies and objects into his mouth, spitting them out as a projectile or eating them. If he inhales certain enemies, he can gain the powers or properties of that enemy manifesting as a weapon or power-up called a Copy Ability.

The first game in the series, Kirby's Dream Land, was conceived by Masahiro Sakurai as a video game for beginners, and released on April 27, 1992. The series is primarily developed by franchise owner HAL Laboratory, but also by other developers, including Nintendo, Good-Feel, Flagship, and Vanpool. The Kirby series includes 40 games, and has sold over 50 million units worldwide, making it one of the best-selling video game franchises of all time.

== Video games ==
=== Mainline ===
Traditional platformers
Game	Details
Kirby's Dream Land Original release date(s): JP: April 27, 1992; NA: August 1, 1992; PAL: August 3, 1992	Release years by system: 1992 – Game Boy2023 – Nintendo Switch (Nintendo Switch Online)
Kirby's Dream Land Original release date(s): JP: April 27, 1992; NA: August 1, 1992; PAL: August 3, 1992	Notes: Known in Japan as Hoshi no Kirby. (Note: Japanese: 星のカービィ, Hepburn: Hoshi no Kābī; lit. Kirby of the Stars); Re-released for download over the Nintendo Power system in Japan.
Kirby's Adventure Original release date(s): JP: March 23, 1993; NA: May 1, 1993; PAL: December 1, 1993	Release years by system: 1993 – Nintendo Entertainment System; 2007 – Wii (Virtual Console); 2011 – Nintendo 3DS (3D Classics); 2013 – Wii U (Virtual Console); 2016 – NES Classic Edition; 2018 – Nintendo Switch (Nintendo Switch Online)
Kirby's Adventure Original release date(s): JP: March 23, 1993; NA: May 1, 1993; PAL: December 1, 1993	Notes: Known in Japan as Hoshi no Kirby: Yume no Izumi no Monogatari. (Note: Japanese: 星のカービィ夢の泉の物語, Hepburn: Hoshi no Kābī Yume no Izumi no Monogatari; lit. Kirby of the Stars: The Story of the Fountain of Dreams)
Kirby's Dream Land 2 Original release date(s): JP: March 21, 1995; NA: May 1, 1995; PAL: July 31, 1995	Release years by system: 1995 – Game Boy; 2012 – Nintendo 3DS (Virtual Console); 2023 – Nintendo Switch (Nintendo Switch Online)
Kirby's Dream Land 2 Original release date(s): JP: March 21, 1995; NA: May 1, 1995; PAL: July 31, 1995	Notes: Known in Japan as Hoshi no Kirby 2. (Note: Japanese: 星のカービィ2, Hepburn: Hoshi no Kābī 2; lit. Kirby of the Stars 2); Re-released for download over the Nintendo Power system in Japan.
Kirby Super Star Original release date(s): JP: March 21, 1996; NA: September 20, 1996; PAL: January 23, 1997	Release years by system: 1996 – Super Nintendo Entertainment System; 2009/2010 – Wii (Virtual Console); 2013 – Wii U (Virtual Console); 2017 – SNES Classic Edition; 2019 – Nintendo Switch (Nintendo Switch Online)
Kirby Super Star Original release date(s): JP: March 21, 1996; NA: September 20, 1996; PAL: January 23, 1997	Notes: Known in Europe as Kirby's Fun Pak and in Japan as Hoshi no Kirby Super Deluxe. (Note: Japanese: 星のカービィ スーパーデラックス, Hepburn: Hoshi no Kābī Sūpā Derakkusu; lit. Kirby of the Stars Super Deluxe); The game is split into six shorter stories with events that interweave between them.
Kirby's Dream Land 3 Original release date(s): NA: November 1, 1997; JP: March 27, 1998; PAL: July 24, 2009 (Wii Virtual Console)	Release years by system: 1997 – Super Nintendo Entertainment System; 2009 – Wii (Virtual Console); 2013 – Wii U (Virtual Console); 2019 – Nintendo Switch (Nintendo Switch Online)
Kirby's Dream Land 3 Original release date(s): NA: November 1, 1997; JP: March 27, 1998; PAL: July 24, 2009 (Wii Virtual Console)	Notes: Known in Japan as Hoshi no Kirby 3. (Note: Japanese: 星のカービィ3, Hepburn: Hoshi no Kābī 3; lit. Kirby of the Stars 3)
Kirby 64: The Crystal Shards Original release date(s): JP: March 24, 2000; NA: June 26, 2000; PAL: June 22, 2001	Release years by system: 2000 – Nintendo 64; 2008 – Wii (Virtual Console); 2022 – Nintendo Switch (Nintendo Switch Online)
Kirby 64: The Crystal Shards Original release date(s): JP: March 24, 2000; NA: June 26, 2000; PAL: June 22, 2001	Notes: Known in Japan as Hoshi no Kirby 64. (Note: Japanese: 星のカービィ64, Hepburn: Hoshi no Kābī 64; lit. Kirby of the Stars 64)
Kirby & the Amazing Mirror Original release date(s): JP: April 15, 2004; PAL: July 2, 2004; NA: October 18, 2004	Release years by system: 2004 – Game Boy Advance; 2011 – Nintendo 3DS (Virtual Console); 2014 – Wii U (Virtual Console); 2023 - Nintendo Switch (Nintendo Switch Online)
Kirby & the Amazing Mirror Original release date(s): JP: April 15, 2004; PAL: July 2, 2004; NA: October 18, 2004	Notes: Known in Japan as Hoshi no Kirby: Kagami no Daimeikyū. (Note: Japanese: 星のカービィ 鏡の大迷宮, Hepburn: Hoshi no Kābī Kagami no Daimeikyū; lit. Kirby of the Stars: The Great Labyrinth of the Mirror)
Kirby: Squeak Squad Original release date(s): JP: November 2, 2006; NA: December 4, 2006; EU: June 22, 2007	Release years by system: 2006 – Nintendo DS
Kirby: Squeak Squad Original release date(s): JP: November 2, 2006; NA: December 4, 2006; EU: June 22, 2007	Notes: Known in Europe as Kirby Mouse Attack and in Japan as Hoshi no Kirby: Sanjō! Dorocche Dan. (Note: Japanese: 星のカービィ 参上! ドロッチェ団, Hepburn: Hoshi no Kābī Sanjō! Dorotche Dan; lit. Kirby of the Stars: Calling on the Dorocche Gang!)
Kirby's Return to Dream Land Original release date(s): NA: October 24, 2011; JP: October 27, 2011; EU: November 25, 2011	Release years by system: 2011 – Wii
Kirby's Return to Dream Land Original release date(s): NA: October 24, 2011; JP: October 27, 2011; EU: November 25, 2011	Notes: Released in Europe and Australia as Kirby's Adventure Wii and in Japan as Hoshi no Kirby Wii. (Note: Japanese: 星のカービィWii, Hepburn: Hoshi no Kābī Wii; lit. Kirby of the Stars Wii)
Kirby: Triple Deluxe Original release date(s): JP: January 11, 2014; NA: May 2, 2014; EU: May 16, 2014	Release years by system: 2014 – Nintendo 3DS
Kirby: Triple Deluxe Original release date(s): JP: January 11, 2014; NA: May 2, 2014; EU: May 16, 2014	Notes: Known in Japan as Hoshi no Kirby: Triple Deluxe. (Note: Japanese: 星のカービィ トリプルデラックス, Hepburn: Hoshi no Kābī Toripuru Derakkusu; lit. Kirby of the Stars: Triple Deluxe)
Kirby: Planet Robobot Original release date(s): JP: April 26, 2016; NA: June 10, 2016; EU: June 10, 2016; AU: June 11, 2016	Release years by system: 2016 – Nintendo 3DS
Kirby: Planet Robobot Original release date(s): JP: April 26, 2016; NA: June 10, 2016; EU: June 10, 2016; AU: June 11, 2016	Notes: Known in Japan as Hoshi no Kirby: Robobo Planet. (Note: Japanese: 星のカービィ ロボボプラネット, Hepburn: Hoshi no Kābī: Robobo Puranetto; lit. Kirby of the Stars: Robobo Planet)
Kirby Star Allies Original release date(s): WW: March 16, 2018	Release years by system: 2018 – Nintendo Switch
Kirby Star Allies Original release date(s): WW: March 16, 2018	Notes: Known in Japan as Hoshi no Kirby: Star Allies. (Note: Japanese: 星のカービィ スターアライズ, Hepburn: Hoshi no Kābī Sutā Araizu; lit. Kirby of the Stars: Star Allies)
Kirby and the Forgotten Land Original release date(s): WW: March 25, 2022	Release years by system: 2022 – Nintendo Switch
Kirby and the Forgotten Land Original release date(s): WW: March 25, 2022	Notes: Known in Japan as Hoshi no Kirby: Discovery. (Note: Japanese: 星のカービィ ディスカバリー, Hepburn: Hoshi no Kābi Disukabarī; lit. Kirby of the Stars: Discovery)
Kirby and the World Beyond Original release date(s): WW: Q2 2027	Release years by system: 2027 – Nintendo Switch 2
Kirby and the World Beyond Original release date(s): WW: Q2 2027	Notes: Upcoming release.; Known in Japan as Hoshi no Kirby: World Beyond. (Note: Japanese: 星のカービィ ワールドビヨンド, Hepburn: Hoshi no Kābi Wārudo Biyondo; lit. Kirby of the Stars: World Beyond)

=== Spin-offs ===
Spin-offs
Game	Details
Kirby's Pinball Land Original release date(s): JP: November 27, 1993; NA: November 30, 1993; PAL: December 1, 1993	Release years by system: 1993 – Game Boy; 2012 – Nintendo 3DS (Virtual Console)
Kirby's Pinball Land Original release date(s): JP: November 27, 1993; NA: November 30, 1993; PAL: December 1, 1993	Notes: Known in Japan as Kirby's Pinball. (Note: Japanese: カービィのピンボール, Hepburn: Kābī no Pinbōru); Re-released for download over the Nintendo Power system in Japan.
Kirby's Dream Course Original release date(s): JP: September 21, 1994; NA: February 1, 1995; PAL: August 24, 1995	Release years by system: 1994 – Super Nintendo Entertainment System; 2007 – Wii (Virtual Console); 2013 – Wii U (Virtual Console); 2019 – Nintendo Switch (Nintendo Switch Online)
Kirby's Dream Course Original release date(s): JP: September 21, 1994; NA: February 1, 1995; PAL: August 24, 1995	Notes: Known in Japan as Kirby Ball or Kirby Bowl. (Note: Japanese: カービィボウル, Hepburn: Kābī Bouru); A Kirby golf game.; Re-released for download over the Nintendo Power system in Japan.
Kirby's Avalanche Original release date(s): PAL: February 1, 1995; NA: April 25, 1995	Release years by system: 1995 – Super Nintendo Entertainment System; 2007 – Wii (Virtual Console); 2022 – Nintendo Switch (Nintendo Switch Online)
Kirby's Avalanche Original release date(s): PAL: February 1, 1995; NA: April 25, 1995	Notes: Known as Kirby's Ghost Trap in the PAL region.; A Kirby puzzle game.; Based on Compile's Puyo Puyo.
Kirby's Block Ball Original release date(s): JP: December 14, 1995; NA: May 13, 1996; EU: August 29, 1996	Release years by system: 1995 – Game Boy; 2011/2012 – Nintendo 3DS (Virtual Console)
Kirby's Block Ball Original release date(s): JP: December 14, 1995; NA: May 13, 1996; EU: August 29, 1996	Notes: Known in Japan as Kirby no Block Ball. (Note: Japanese: カービィのブロックボール, Hepburn: Kābī no Burokku Bōru); A breakout clone skinned with the Kirby franchise.; Re-released for download over the Nintendo Power system in Japan.
Kirby no Omochabako Original release date(s): JP: February 8, 1996	Release years by system: 1996 – Satellaview (a Super Famicom add-on)
Kirby no Omochabako Original release date(s): JP: February 8, 1996	Notes: Originally released exclusively in Japan.; 8 mini-games released over the Satellaview to advertise Japanese release of Kirby Super Star.; Translated literally as Kirby's Toy Box. (Note: Japanese: カービィのおもちゃ箱, Hepburn: Kābī no Omochabako)
Kirby's Star Stacker Original release date(s): NA: July 7, 1997; JP: March 18, 1997; EU: August 28, 1997	Release years by system: 1997 – Game Boy; 1998 – Super Nintendo Entertainment System; 2010 – Wii (Virtual Console); 2012/2013 – Nintendo 3DS (Virtual Console) (Game Boy version); 2022/2023 – Nintendo Switch (Nintendo Switch Online) (SNES version); 2025 - Nintendo Switch (Nintendo Switch Online) (Game Boy version)
Kirby's Star Stacker Original release date(s): NA: July 7, 1997; JP: March 18, 1997; EU: August 28, 1997	Notes: Known in Japan as Kirby no Kirakira Kizzu. (Note: Japanese: カービィのきらきらきっず, Hepburn: Kābī no Kirakira Kizzu; lit. Kirby's Sparkling Kids); Later released exclusively in Japan for the Super Famicom under the same title.; A Kirby puzzle game similar to Puyo Puyo and Tetris.; Re-released for download over the Nintendo Power system in Japan.
Kirby Tilt 'n' Tumble Original release date(s): JP: August 26, 2000; NA: April 9, 2001	Release years by system: 2000 – Game Boy Color; 2023 – Nintendo Switch (Nintendo Switch Online)
Kirby Tilt 'n' Tumble Original release date(s): JP: August 26, 2000; NA: April 9, 2001	Notes: Known in Japan as Koro Koro Kirby. (Note: Japanese: コロコロカービィ, Hepburn: Koro Koro Kābī; lit. Roly-Poly Kirby); The first Game Boy Color game to use motion controls.
Kirby Air Ride Original release date(s): JP: July 11, 2003; NA: October 13, 2003; EU: February 27, 2004	Release years by system: 2003 – GameCube
Kirby Air Ride Original release date(s): JP: July 11, 2003; NA: October 13, 2003; EU: February 27, 2004	Notes: Known in Japan as Kirby no Airride. (Note: Japanese: カービィのエアライド, Hepburn: Kābī no Earaido; lit. Kirby's Airride); A Kirby arcade racing game.
Kirby: Canvas Curse Original release date(s): JP: March 24, 2005; NA: June 13, 2005; EU: November 25, 2005; AU: April 6, 2006	Release years by system: 2005 – Nintendo DS
Kirby: Canvas Curse Original release date(s): JP: March 24, 2005; NA: June 13, 2005; EU: November 25, 2005; AU: April 6, 2006	Notes: Known in Europe as Kirby: Power Paintbrush and in Japan as Touch! Kirby. (Note: Japanese: タッチ!カービィ, Hepburn: Tacchi! Kābī)
Kirby's Epic Yarn Original release date(s): JP: October 14, 2010; NA: October 17, 2010; EU: February 25, 2011	Release years by system: 2010 – Wii
Kirby's Epic Yarn Original release date(s): JP: October 14, 2010; NA: October 17, 2010; EU: February 25, 2011	Notes: Known in Japan as Keito no Kirby. (Note: Japanese: 毛糸のカービィ, Hepburn: Keito no Kābī; lit. Yarn Kirby)
Kirby Mass Attack Original release date(s): JP: August 4, 2011; NA: September 19, 2011; EU: October 28, 2011; AU: October 27, 2011	Release years by system: 2011 – Nintendo DS
Kirby Mass Attack Original release date(s): JP: August 4, 2011; NA: September 19, 2011; EU: October 28, 2011; AU: October 27, 2011	Notes: Released in Japan as Atsumete! Kirby. (Note: Japanese: あつめて！カービィ, Hepburn: Atsumete! Kābī; lit. Gather! Kirby)
Kirby Fighters Deluxe Original release date(s): WW: 2014	Release years by system: 2015 – Nintendo 3DS (eShop)
Kirby Fighters Deluxe Original release date(s): WW: 2014	Notes: An expanded version of the minigame Kirby Fighters from Kirby: Triple Deluxe
Dedede's Drum Dash Deluxe Original release date(s): WW: 2014	Release years by system: 2015 – Nintendo 3DS (eShop)
Dedede's Drum Dash Deluxe Original release date(s): WW: 2014	Notes: An expanded version of the minigame Dedede's Drum Dash from Kirby: Triple Deluxe
Kirby and the Rainbow Curse Original release date(s): JP: January 22, 2015; NA: February 20, 2015; EU: May 8, 2015	Release years by system: 2015 – Wii U
Kirby and the Rainbow Curse Original release date(s): JP: January 22, 2015; NA: February 20, 2015; EU: May 8, 2015	Notes: Known in Europe and Australia as Kirby and the Rainbow Paintbrush and in Japan as Touch! Kirby Super Rainbow. (Note: Japanese: タッチ！カービィ スーパーレインボー, Hepburn: Tacchi! Kābī Sūpāreinbō)
Team Kirby Clash Deluxe Original release date(s): WW: 2017	Release years by system: 2017 – Nintendo 3DS (eShop)
Team Kirby Clash Deluxe Original release date(s): WW: 2017	Notes: An expanded version of the minigame Kirby 3D Rumble from Kirby: Planet Robobot.
Kirby's Blowout Blast Original release date(s): WW: 2017	Release years by system: 2017 – Nintendo 3DS (eShop)
Kirby's Blowout Blast Original release date(s): WW: 2017	Notes: An expanded version of the minigame Kirby 3D Rumble from Kirby: Planet Robobot.
Kirby Battle Royale Original release date(s): WW: 2017	Release years by system: 2017 – Nintendo 3DS
Kirby Battle Royale Original release date(s): WW: 2017	Notes: Known in Japan as Kirby Battle Deluxe! (Note: Japanese: カービィ バトルデラックス!, Hepburn: Kābī Batoru Derakkusu!).
Super Kirby Clash Original release date(s): WW: 2019	Release years by system: 2019 – Nintendo Switch
Super Kirby Clash Original release date(s): WW: 2019	Notes: A free-to-play follow-up to Team Kirby Clash Deluxe with new content.
Kirby Fighters 2 Original release date(s): WW: 2020	Release years by system: 2020 – Nintendo Switch
Kirby Fighters 2 Original release date(s): WW: 2020	Notes: A sequel to Kirby Fighters Deluxe with new characters, stages, and game modes.
Kirby's Dream Buffet Original release date(s): WW: August 17, 2022	Release years by system: 2022 – Nintendo Switch
Kirby's Dream Buffet Original release date(s): WW: August 17, 2022	Notes: Known in Japan as Kirby's Gourmet Festival. (Note: Japanese: カービィのグルメフェス, Hepburn: Kābī no Gurume Fesu; lit. Kirby's Gourmet Festival); A Kirby party video game with each "Gourmet Grand Prix" containing 2 races, a unique minigame, and a battle royale.
Kirby Air Riders Original release date(s): WW: November 20, 2025	Release years by system: 2025 – Nintendo Switch 2
Kirby Air Riders Original release date(s): WW: November 20, 2025	Notes: A sequel to Kirby Air Ride

=== Reissues ===
Reissues
Game	Details
Kirby: Nightmare in Dream Land Original release date(s): JP: October 25, 2002; NA: December 2, 2002; PAL: September 26, 2003	Release years by system: 2002 – Game Boy Advance; 2014 – Wii U (Virtual Console)
Kirby: Nightmare in Dream Land Original release date(s): JP: October 25, 2002; NA: December 2, 2002; PAL: September 26, 2003	Notes: Known in Japan as Hoshi no Kirby: Yume no Izumi Deluxe. (Note: Japanese: 星のカービィ 夢の泉デラックス, Hepburn: Hoshi no Kābī Yume no Izumi Derakkusu; lit. Kirby of the Stars: The Fountain of Dreams Deluxe); Remake of Kirby's Adventure.
Kirby Super Star Ultra Original release date(s): NA: September 29, 2008; JP: November 6, 2008; EU: December 18, 2009	Release years by system: 2008 – Nintendo DS
Kirby Super Star Ultra Original release date(s): NA: September 29, 2008; JP: November 6, 2008; EU: December 18, 2009	Notes: Known in Japan as Hoshi no Kirby: Ultra Super Deluxe. (Note: Japanese: 星のカービィ ウルトラスーパーデラックス, Hepburn: Hoshi no Kābī Urutora Sūpā Derakkusu; lit. Kirby of the Stars Ultra Super Deluxe); Remake of Kirby Super Star.; The game includes full-motion video, a graphical upgrade, and touch-screen support, all of which were not available in the original.
Kirby's Dream Collection Original release date(s): NA: September 16, 2012; JP: July 19, 2012	Release years by system: 2012 – Wii
Kirby's Dream Collection Original release date(s): NA: September 16, 2012; JP: July 19, 2012	Notes: Includes Kirby's Dream Land, Kirby's Adventure, Kirby's Dream Land 2, Kirby Super Star, Kirby's Dream Land 3, and Kirby 64: The Crystal Shards.; Known in Japan as Hoshi no Kirby 20-shūnen Special Collection. (Note: Japanese: 星のカービィ 20周年スペシャルコレクション, Hepburn: Hoshi no Kābī Ni-ju-shūnen Supesharu Korekushon; lit. Kirby of the Stars 20th Anniversary Special Collection)
Kirby's Extra Epic Yarn Original release date(s): WW: March 8, 2019	Release years by system: 2019 – Nintendo 3DS
Kirby's Extra Epic Yarn Original release date(s): WW: March 8, 2019	Notes: Remake of Kirby's Epic Yarn.; Known in Japan as Keito no Kirby Plus. (Note: Japanese: 毛糸のカービィ プラス, Hepburn: Keito no kābyi purasu; lit. Yarn Kirby Plus)
Kirby's Return to Dream Land Deluxe Original release date(s): WW: February 24, 2023	Release years by system: 2023 – Nintendo Switch
Kirby's Return to Dream Land Deluxe Original release date(s): WW: February 24, 2023	Notes: Despite the original being known as "Kirby's Adventure Wii" in PAL regions, the remake is known as "Kirby's Return To Dream Land Deluxe" in both North America and PAL regions.; Known in Japan as Hoshi no Kirby Wii Deluxe. (Note: Japanese: 星のカービィ Wii デラックス, Hepburn: Hoshi no Kābyi Wii Derakkusu; lit. Kirby of the Stars Wii Deluxe)
Kirby and the Forgotten Land – Nintendo Switch 2 Edition + Star-Crossed World Original release date(s): WW: August 8, 2025	Release years by system: 2025 – Nintendo Switch 2
Kirby and the Forgotten Land – Nintendo Switch 2 Edition + Star-Crossed World Original release date(s): WW: August 8, 2025	Notes: Enhanced edition of Kirby and the Forgotten Land featuring a new story titled Star-Crossed World.; Known in Japan as Hoshi no Kirby: Discovery – Nintendo Switch 2 Edition + Starry World. (Note: Japanese: 星のカービィ ディスカバリー Nintendo Switch 2 Edition ＋ スターリーワールド, Hepburn: Hoshi no Kābyi Disukabarī Nintendo Switch 2 Edition + Sutārī Wārudo; lit. Kirby of the Stars: Discovery – Nintendo Switch 2 Edition + Starry World)

=== Canceled ===
Canceled titles
Game	Details
Kid Kirby Cancellation date: 1995	Proposed system release: Super Nintendo Entertainment System
Kid Kirby Cancellation date: 1995	Notes: Was planned to use the SNES Mouse.
Kirby's Air Ride Cancellation date: N/A	Proposed system release: Nintendo 64
Kirby's Air Ride Cancellation date: N/A	Notes: Was later released on the GameCube in 2003 as Kirby Air Ride.
Kirby Tilt 'n' Tumble 2 Cancellation date: 2002	Proposed system release: GameCube/Game Boy Advance
Kirby Tilt 'n' Tumble 2 Cancellation date: 2002	Notes: Sequel to Kirby Tilt 'n' Tumble for the Game Boy Color.; Used the Game Boy Advance as a controller for the GameCube game using the GameCube – Game Boy Advance link cable to connect the two together; the Game Boy Advance is used as a motion sensor as it was in the first Kirby Tilt 'n' Tumble.
Kirby for GameCube Cancellation date: N/A	Proposed system release: GameCube
Kirby for GameCube Cancellation date: N/A	Notes: Elements of the game were used in Kirby's Return to Dream Land.
Untitled Kirby game for Wii Cancellation date: N/A	Proposed system release: Wii
Untitled Kirby game for Wii Cancellation date: N/A	Notes: Elements of the game were used in Kirby's Return to Dream Land.

== Other media ==
Other media titles
Game	Details
Kirby: Right Back at Ya! 2001–2003 – 100-episode television series	Notes: Distributed in North America by 4Kids Entertainment for a four-year run showing all one hundred episodes, from 2002 to 2006.
Kirby of the Stars: The Story of Dedede Who Lives In Pupupu 1994–2006 2017–present – Manga	Notes: Long-running Kirby manga series.
