= Kirby's Dream Buffet =

2022 video game

- Cover art
- Developer: HAL Laboratory
- Publisher: Nintendo
- Director: Shinya Kumazaki
- Producers: Tadashi Kamitake; Toyokazu Nonaka
- Designers: Yuya Kozuka; Ryosuke Sakamoto
- Programmer: Hiroshi Ohnishi
- Artist: Riki Fuhrmann
- Composers: Yuuta Ogasawara; Jun Ishikawa; Shogo Sakai; Hirokazu Ando; Megumi Ohara; Yuki Shimooka
- Series: Kirby
- Platform: Nintendo Switch
- Release: WW: August 17, 2022
- Genres: Racing, party, battle royale, action
- Modes: Single-player, multiplayer

Kirby's Dream Buffet is a 2022 action, racing, and party video game developed by HAL Laboratory and published by Nintendo for the Nintendo Switch as a spin-off title in the Kirby series. It was announced via social media in July 2022 and was digitally released worldwide for the Nintendo eShop the following month. The game supports both local and online multiplayer.

Kirby's Dream Buffet's gameplay revolves around four player characters known as Kirbys, each controlled by either a human player or artificial intelligence, competing in a variety of dessert-themed race courses and minigames with the objective of collecting the most strawberries, growing larger in the process. Strawberries can be obtained through various means, including finishing races quickly, defeating enemies, and knocking out other racers, all of which can be achieved with food-themed power-ups that replace the series's traditional Copy Abilities.

Kirby's Dream Buffet received mixed reviews, with general praise for its visuals, divided opinions on its gameplay, and criticism for its online mode. It was nominated for Family Game of the Year during the 26th Annual D.I.C.E. Awards, losing to Mario + Rabbids Sparks of Hope (2022). Many reviewers compared the game to Fall Guys (2020) both before and after its release. Kirby's Dream Buffet was released just a few months after the release of Kirby and the Forgotten Land (2022), a mainline Kirby game.

== Gameplay ==
Kirby's Dream Buffet is a multiplayer video game in which the player characters – four ball-shaped Kirbys – roll through dessert-themed levels and compete to collect the most strawberries. In the game's frame story, Kirby is suddenly shrunken down by the Dream Fork, causing him to land in the cake he was about to eat.

Each Kirby can be controlled by either a human player or artificial intelligence (AI), with the latter having four difficulty levels. Multiple non-player characters known as Waddle Dees are also controlled by AI. As characters consume strawberries, they increase in size and speed, though hovering becomes more difficult. Players can defeat enemies and use food power-ups on each level to attack one another or expand their lead; for instance, chili peppers give characters a speed boost, doughnuts temporarily turn them into wheels, and jelly allows them to travel under walls. The game can be played locally with up to two human players (four if more than one console is used) and online with up to four players, with the lattermost option requiring a Nintendo Switch Online account. Matches can be randomized or played in private lobbies.

There are three types of rounds, each with several different levels:

- Race: The level is laid out like a race track. The first, second, and third players to reach the goal are granted 50, 20, and 10 additional strawberries, respectively.
- Minigame: Events that typically take place on a small level, wherein players have 20 seconds to gain strawberries while avoiding obstacles and defeating enemies.
- Battle Royale: Similarly to in minigame rounds, players compete on a small level with abilities and strawberries dropping over time. Players can steal others' strawberries and earn bonuses by knocking opponents off the level.

Rounds can be played separately or in the main game mode, Gourmet Grand Prix, in which players compete in a race, a minigame, another race, and then a Battle Royale. Afterwards, 40-strawberry bonuses are given out based on random statistical conditions, such as collecting the most strawberries, knocking down the most barriers, hovering for the longest amount of time, or defeating the most players. The player with the highest strawberry count wins the game. Another game mode, Free Rolling, allows players to test out Kirby's abilities and customize their character.

After completing individual rounds or a Gourmet Grand Prix, players are awarded points to raise their "Gourmet Rank". There are 135 ranks in total, and each time a player's rank increases, they unlock a new costume, color, level, or music track that can be used for customization. In online matches, every player can customize their character, while in local matches, only one player can customize their character. Players can also unlock "Character Treats", cookies based on characters from the Kirby series, which can be displayed on a cake in the hub world.

== Development and release ==
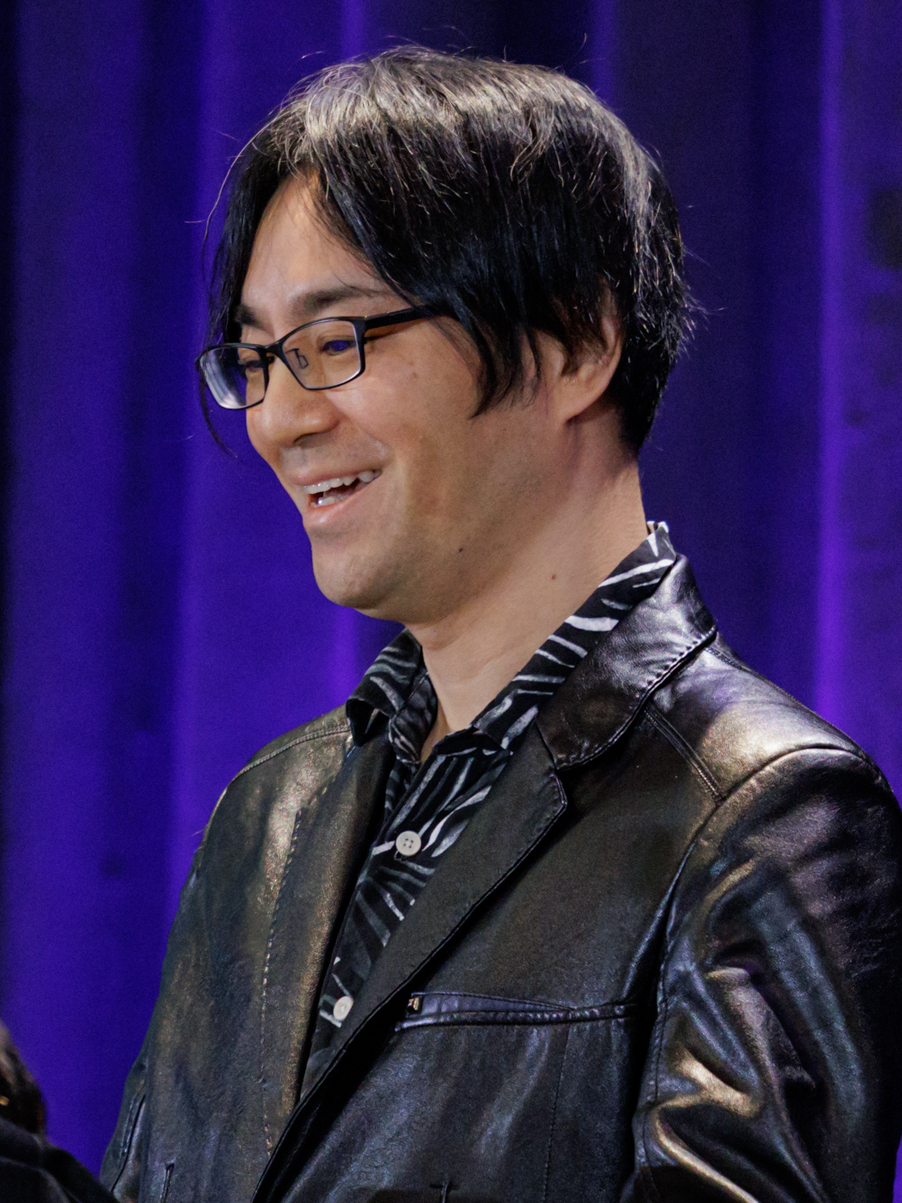
Shinya Kumazaki, the game's director

Kirby's Dream Buffet was developed by HAL Laboratory and directed by Shinya Kumazaki, with Riki Fuhrmann serving as art director. The game was revealed by Nintendo with an announcement trailer via social media on July 12, 2022, set to be released in the summer of that year as a spin-off installment in the Kirby series. Upon reveal, the game was widely likened to Fall Guys (2020), with similarities being noted between the games' obstacle courses. Moreover, the party game atmosphere was compared to that of the Mario Party series. Along with Kirby and the Forgotten Land (2022), Kirby's Dream Buffet was believed to be part of the celebration of the 30th anniversary of Kirby's debut in Kirby's Dream Land (1992).

Nintendo announced the game's official release date in a new trailer shown during the Kirby 30th Anniversary Music Festival on August 11, 2022, which also revealed that standard Copy Abilities would be replaced with food power-ups. Kirby's Dream Buffet was digitally released worldwide for the Nintendo eShop on August 17, 2022, priced at $15 or £13.49. On the same date of the game's release, the restaurant chain Kirby Café announced via Twitter that both its Tokyo and Hakata-ku branches would begin selling a dessert inspired by Kirby's Dream Buffet on September 1, 2022.

Despite not featuring a typical storyline, Kirby's Dream Buffet was adapted into a light novel in which a witch's magical fork grants Kirby's wish to eat even more snacks, shrinking down Kirby, King Dedede, Meta Knight, and other characters, thus beginning a race to the Gourmet King's throne on a snack mountain. The book was released on December 14, 2022, in Japan.

The Tetris 99 (2019) 31st Maximus Cup event, which ran from December 15–19, 2022, featured a new theme that could be unlocked by earning a total of 100 event points. The theme included art, music, and tetromino designs inspired by Kirby's Dream Buffet. As part of Tetris 99's "Second Chance: Kirby Edition" 49th Maximus Cup, the Kirby's Dream Buffet theme returned exclusively on August 31, 2025, and could now be earned with only 20 points.

In April 2023, Sanei, one of Nintendo's primary merchandising partners, announced that eight Kirby plushies based on Kirby's Dream Buffet would be released.

== Reception ==
=== Critical response ===
Reception

Aggregate scores
Aggregator	Score
Metacritic	67/100
OpenCritic	29% recommend

Review scores
Publication	Score
Destructoid	7/10
GameSpot	6/10
Hardcore Gamer	4/5
Nintendo Life	8/10
Nintendo World Report	6/10
NME	3/5
Shacknews	7/10
TouchArcade	3/5
VG247	2/5
Common Sense Media	4/5
The Independent	7/10

Kirby's Dream Buffet received "mixed or average" reviews from critics, according to the review aggregation website Metacritic. Fellow review aggregator OpenCritic assessed that the game received fair approval, being recommended by 29% of critics. The gameplay was widely compared to that of Fall Guys, as well as that of Super Monkey Ball. In summarizing the game, Jasper Pickering of The Independent wrote, "While nothing groundbreaking, Kirby's Dream Buffet is like a macaron – bite-sized, sweet and colourful, but best enjoyed in small servings."

The game's visuals were consistently praised by critics, many of whom referred to the food theme as "adorable", with Kirstin Swalley of Hardcore Gamer praising the attention to detail. Swalley likewise complimented the "utterly fantastic" music, which GameSpot's Jessica Cogswell described as "delightful, being composed of upbeat and somewhat jazzy tunes". Multiple reviewers also praised the variety of unlockable collectibles and customizations. Kelsey Raynor of VG247 observed that there was "no obvious skill gap between players", with The Independent's Jasper Pickering adding that the basic control scheme was easy for players of almost any age to learn.

Critics were divided on the gameplay; Nintendo World Report's Neal Ronaghan and GameSpot's Jessica Cogswell both found it repetitive, which the latter attributed to a lack of differences between race courses and minigames. Although Cogswell complimented the strawberry bonuses for allowing players to make comebacks while keeping the game "lighthearted and fun", she also wrote that there was "a serious lack of content and incentives to keep playing". Conversely, Kirstin Swalley of Hardcore Gamer believed that the "endearing and wonderful gameplay" was the game's biggest attraction. Swalley, NME's Jen Allen, and The Independent's Jasper Pickering all found the game modes appealing due to their short lengths. PJ O'Reilly of Nintendo Life noted variety in the race tracks and arenas, Christian Donlan of Eurogamer described the tracks as "inventive and tricksy", and Giovanni Colantonio of Digital Trends highlighted the "wonderfully creative food levels". However, Neal Ronaghan of Nintendo World Report opined that the minigames were "a nice way to break up the races, but they're overly simple, empty-calorie competitions", while Kelsey Raynor of VG247 found the arenas too similar and short.

Numerous critics expressed disappointment with local multiplayer being restricted to two players, with many reviewers desiring a four-player split-screen option. GameSpot's Jessica Cogswell and Destructoid's Chris Carter agreed that this was "a missed opportunity". The online mode was also generally criticized for its connectivity issues, including lag. In his review for Common Sense Media, Dwayne Jenkins referred to this component as "a little inconsistent", noting that it was possible to be disconnected from an online game without warning or reason. Giovanni Colantonio of Digital Trends wrote that "the game finds Nintendo's shaky online system at its worst here", with constant slowdown being "a real momentum killer, especially in a racing game". Miscellaneous criticism was directed at the absence of a single-player campaign, as well as a lack of enjoyment in playing against AI-controlled opponents. Despite these flaws, many reviewers felt that the game's price was reasonable given the amount of content offered.

=== Sales ===
The download card for Kirby's Dream Buffet sold more than 7,000 units within its first week of release in Japan, making it the sixth-best-selling retail game of the week in the country.

=== Accolades ===
In 2022, the Academy of Interactive Arts & Sciences nominated Kirby's Dream Buffet for Family Game of the Year during the 26th Annual D.I.C.E. Awards, which was ultimately awarded to Mario + Rabbids Sparks of Hope (2022).

== See also ==
- List of Kirby media
- List of Nintendo Switch games
- List of racing video games
- List of party video games
- List of battle royale games
- 2022 in video games
