= Kirby and the World Beyond =

Upcoming 2027 video game

- Developer: HAL Laboratory
- Publisher: Nintendo
- Series: Kirby
- Platform: Nintendo Switch 2
- Release: Early 2027

Kirby and the World Beyond (Note: Japanese: 星のカービィ ワールドビヨンド, Hepburn: Hoshi no Kābī Wārudobiyondo; Kirby of the Stars: World Beyond) is an upcoming video game developed by HAL Laboratory and published by Nintendo for the Nintendo Switch 2, scheduled to launch in early 2027. It will be the fourteenth mainline Kirby game and the second 3D mainline Kirby game after Kirby and the Forgotten Land. The game was revealed in a Nintendo Direct on September 9, 2026. The Direct footage depicted Kirby in a self-contained world, leading some journalists to compare the footage to the 1998 film The Truman Show.
