= Kirby Café =

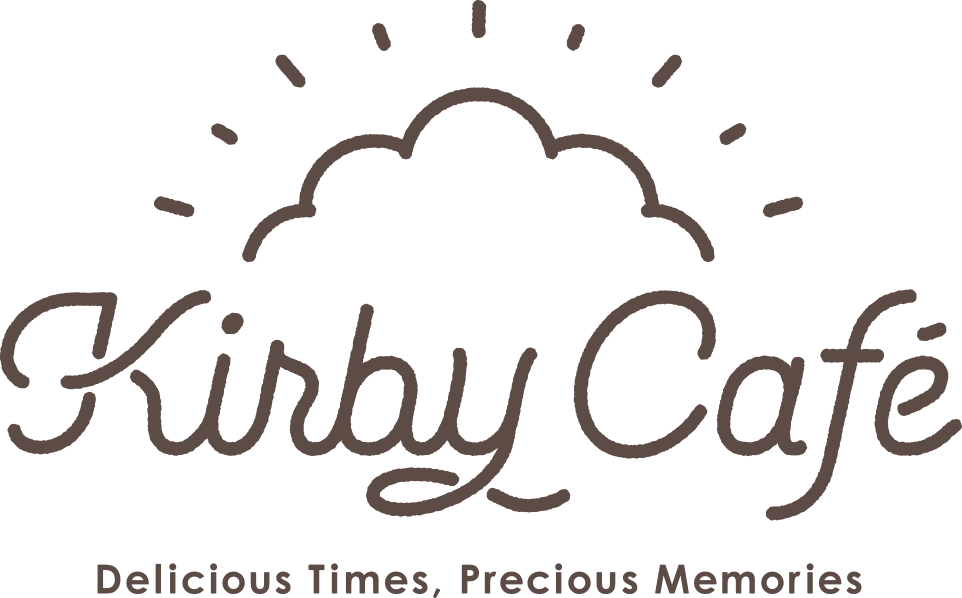

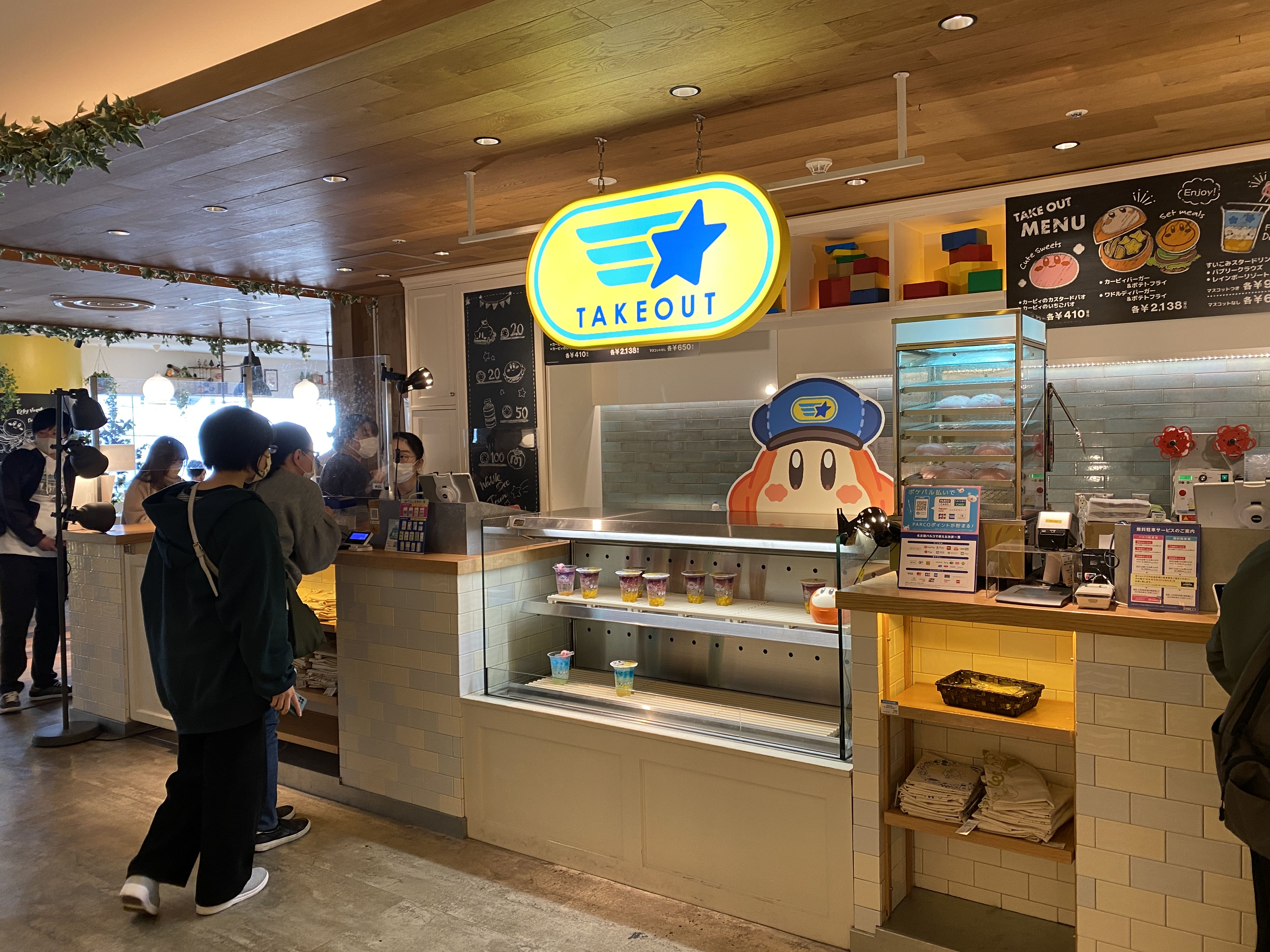
- The Kirby Café in Nagoya in 2023

Restaurant information
- Established: August 2016
- Owners: Benelic (under licence by Nintendo and HAL Laboratory)
- Location: Sumida, Tokyo; Hakata-ku, Fukuoka; Shinsaibashi, Osaka, Japan
- Website: kirbycafe.jp

Kirby Café is a restaurant chain in Japan operated by Benelic and themed around the Kirby franchise and its titular protagonist, both co-owned by Nintendo and HAL Laboratory. The chain currently comprises three permanent locations—one within the special ward of Sumida City in the Solamachi entertainment complex, one within Hakata-ku in the Canal City Hakata entertainment complex, and one within Shinsaibashi in the Daimaru department store—and a number of temporary locations which have run continuously since August 2016.

== History ==
On July 7, 2016, Kirby Café's Twitter account posted its first tweet, which teased the upcoming opening of the café. A month later, Kirby Café was formally unveiled in Osaka and opened in August as the first in a Japan-only chain. A second location in opened in Tokyo soon after, followed by a merchandise-only location in Nagoya. This version of the café was a temporary pop-up restaurant which ran until October 2016.

After a hiatus in 2017, Kirby Café was eventually re-opened to the public in September 2018, again in a temporary capacity. Due to continued demand, the temporary run was extended several times, and eventually resulted in several permanent locations being built. The first permanent Kirby Café was the location in Sumida's Solamachi shopping complex, whose gift shop—previously located on a separate floor—was closed and moved to the café proper in March 2021. The second permanent location is in Hakata-ku, Fukuoka, within the Canal City Hakata building. A third permanent location, located in the Daimaru department store in Shinsaibashi, Osaka, opened in 2024. Kirby Café locations require an advance reservation to visit, and reservations are often sold out for months in advance.

== Goods ==
Kirby Café is themed around the Kirby franchise. The restaurant serves meals such as burgers and pizza, as well as pastries and drinks, with a distinctive Kirby theme. Some items resemble the character of Kirby, such as pink custard cakes and burgers with pink buns, and others are within the series' theme, such as a tomato soup dish that resembles the Maxim Tomato power-up and a salad plate made to resemble the boss character Whispy Woods. Some items have little resemblance to the series apart from a sticker bearing the likeness of one of the characters. Other items are designed to promote specific games within the series, such as a cake based on the "Mouthful Mode" power-up from Kirby and the Forgotten Land (2022).

The restaurant has temporary seasonal offerings such as a chocolate pizza, served on a board shaped like Kirby inhaling, that was added to the restaurant's winter menu on January 15, 2021, and was served until February 28. For its "Sweet New Year 2021" celebration the Kirby Café added a "hamburger" to its menu consisting of a slice of strawberry standing in for the tomato and a dollop of chocolate mousse for the patty.

Kirby Café also sells merchandise, both inside the restaurants themselves and through external gift shops. Items sold include magnets, mugs, neck pillows, postcards, kitchenware, and tote bags featuring the series characters. The gift shops do not require a reservation to visit. The music that plays within the café consists of jazz arrangements of the series' music, and was arranged by the composers who work on the Kirby video games; these soundtracks are sold at the stores as The Sound of Kirby Café, with three volumes released in August 2016, December 2019, and December 2025, respectively. Some merchandise, such as figurines, can only be purchased as part of a meal.
