= Kirby's Adventure =

1993 video game

- North American box art
- Developer: HAL Laboratory
- Publisher: Nintendo
- Director: Masahiro Sakurai
- Producers: Satoru Iwata; Shigeru Miyamoto; Takao Shimizu
- Designer: Masahiro Sakurai
- Programmer: Hiroaki Suga
- Composer: Hirokazu Ando
- Series: Kirby
- Platforms: NES, Nintendo 3DS
- Release: NES: JP: March 23, 1993; NA: May 1993; PAL: September 12, 1993; Nintendo 3DS: NA/PAL: November 17, 2011; JP: April 25, 2012
- Genre: Platform
- Mode: Single-player

Kirby's Adventure (Note: Known in Japan as Hoshi no Kābī: Yume no Izumi no Monogatari (星のカービィ 夢の泉の物語, Kirby of the Stars: The Story of the Fountain of Dreams)) is a 1993 platform game developed by HAL Laboratory and published by Nintendo for the Nintendo Entertainment System (NES). It is the second game in the Kirby series after Kirby's Dream Land (1992) on the Game Boy and the first to include the Copy Ability, which allows the main character Kirby to gain new powers by eating certain enemies. The game centers around Kirby traveling across Dream Land to repair the Star Rod after King Dedede breaks it apart and gives the pieces to his minions.

Masahiro Sakurai returned as director after serving the same role for Kirby's Dream Land. He conceived the copy ability to add more challenge and replay value after the last game received criticism for its simplicity. Because the NES hardware had greater graphical power than the Game Boy and programmers were skilled with the now antiquated hardware, HAL Laboratory was able to create impressive visuals. Kirby's Adventure is the first game to depict Kirby in color. Sakurai had always planned him to be pink, much to the surprise of other staff.

Kirby's Adventure was well received and commended for its tight controls, level variety, and the new copy ability. In retrospect, journalists have ranked it among the best NES games. It was remade in 2002 for the Game Boy Advance with enhanced graphics and multiplayer support, titled Kirby: Nightmare in Dream Land. The original NES version was re-released later via Nintendo's Virtual Console digital distribution services, the Wii compilation disc Kirby's Dream Collection, the NES Classic Edition, the Nintendo Classics service, and with stereoscopic 3D for the 3D Classics product line for the Nintendo 3DS.

== Gameplay ==
Kirby inhaling a Hot Head in the first stage in Vegetable Valley

Like its predecessor Kirby's Dream Land (1992), Kirby's Adventure is a 2D side-scrolling platform game. In the game's scenario, an evil entity named Nightmare corrupts the Fountain of Dreams, which provides restful sleep to the residents of Dream Land. King Dedede steals the Star Rod that powers the fountain and gives pieces of it to his friends in an effort to stop Nightmare. Kirby, the player character of the single-player game, mistakenly believes that Dedede stole the rod for evil and sets out to reunite the pieces. When Kirby defeats Dedede and returns the rod to the fountain, Nightmare goes into outer space to spread bad dreams, but Kirby follows him and uses the rod's power to defeat him.

Kirby retains his abilities from Kirby's Dream Land: he can walk left or right, crouch, and jump. To attack, Kirby inhales enemies or objects and spits them out as star-shaped bullets. He can also fly by inflating himself; while flying, Kirby cannot attack or use his other abilities, but he can exhale at any time, releasing a puff of air that cancels his flight and can be used to damage enemies or destroy blocks. New moves include the abilities to run at a fast pace and to perform a sliding kick. A major aspect of the game is Kirby's copy abilities. By inhaling and swallowing certain enemies, Kirby will obtain powers based on the special ability the enemy possessed. Copy abilities allow Kirby to access new areas and experience levels in different ways. Certain copy abilities can only be used a limited number of times. Kirby can discard his ability at any time or lose it when he is hit by an enemy; he must reacquire it quickly or it will disappear.

The game consists of forty-one levels across seven worlds, each containing a lobby with doors leading to four to six regular levels, a boss fight, and a Warp Star door which enables Kirby to travel back to previous worlds. Most worlds also contain minigames (Note: The minigames include Crane Fever, in which the player picks up items using a claw crane; Egg Catcher, in which Dedede throws eggs and bombs at Kirby and the player must eat the eggs and avoid the bombs; and Quick Draw Kirby, in which the player must win a standoff.) which allow Kirby to gain extra lives, museums where Kirby may easily gain certain powers, and arenas where Kirby must battle with a miniboss to win health and allow him to copy the boss's special ability. The game automatically saves the player's progress after each level. The objective of each main level is simply to reach its end. If Kirby touches an enemy or a dangerous object, he will lose a section of his health meter. If all of his health is lost or he falls off the bottom of the screen, the player loses a life. Losing all lives results in a game over. Kirby can touch or eat food items to replenish health or gain temporary invulnerability.

== Development ==
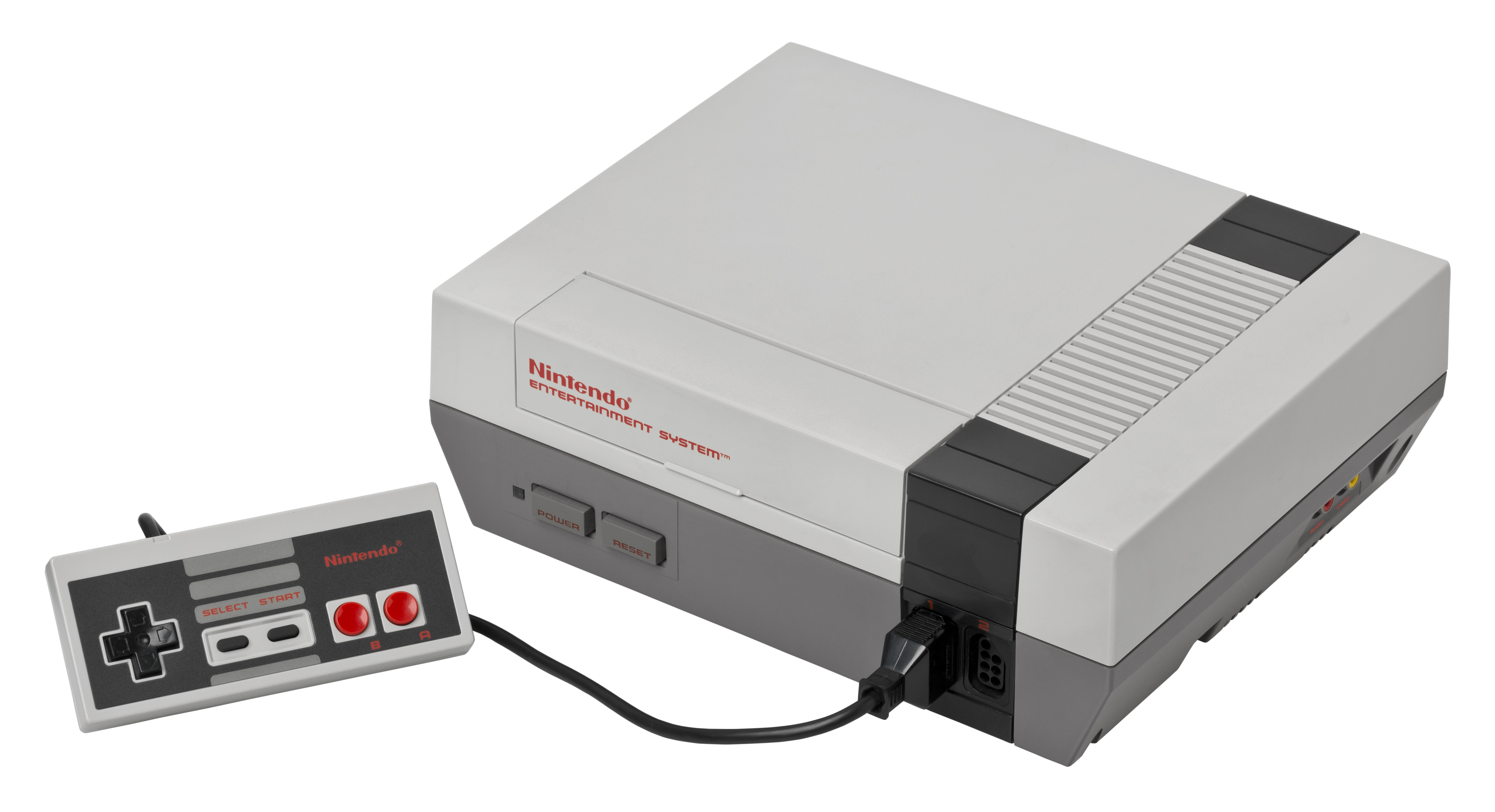
The NES was already on the market for eight years when Kirby's Adventure was released.

Kirby's Adventure was developed by HAL Laboratory in Kōfu as a Nintendo Entertainment System (NES) successor to their 1992 Game Boy game Kirby's Dream Land. Masahiro Sakurai returned as director and designer, with Takashi Saitou assisting designing. Hiroaki Suga was lead programmer, while Satoru Iwata, Shigeru Miyamoto, and Takao Shimizu were the producers; Iwata also provided programming assistance. According to Sakurai, development began in 1992, after he was asked to port Kirby's Dream Land to the NES. Since the Game Boy title was aimed at beginners and the NES player base was more experienced, Sakurai chose to create a new game instead. As a result, little of Kirby's Adventure is based on Kirby's Dream Land: "Even though we could use the same pixel art for Kirby, when it came to capacity and what was possible, all that expanded greatly with NES."

HAL Laboratory wanted to expand Kirby's existing repertoire of moves. Kirby's Dream Land was designed for beginner players, but as a result received criticism from more experienced players looking for a challenge. With Kirby's Adventure, Sakurai wanted to retain simple gameplay, but improve it so skilled players would enjoy it. This led to the conception of the Copy Abilities, which the team hoped would allow players to experiment and improve the replay value. HAL Laboratory created over 40 Copy Abilities, after which they selected their favorites to include in the final game. They also added minigames because they feared that Kirby's expanded set of moves would give players the impression that Kirby's Adventure was a difficult game. They were designed to be simpler and easier than the main game. Kirby was also given the ability to run faster and perform a slide attack to increase the game's pace.

Programmers were skilled with squeezing power out of the ten-year-old NES hardware by 1993. Kirby's spit attack was made stronger if multiple enemies or objects were inhaled, something they had wanted to implement in Kirby's Dream Land. Kirby's Adventure is the first game to depict Kirby in color. Sakurai had always envisioned Kirby as pink, but the Game Boy's monochrome visuals rendered him white in Kirby's Dream Land. The other staff were shocked when they learned Kirby was pink. Kirby's sprite was also made larger after players complained he was too small in his Game Boy debut. While backgrounds are typically designed by someone experienced in game mapping, for Kirby's Adventure, HAL Laboratory had an artist draw pictures of the backgrounds, which were then handed to the mapper to work into the game. According to Saitou, they were supposed to be "pretty enough just to look at on their own." Kirby's Adventure also marks the first appearance of Meta Knight, who appears as an unnamed boss in one of the game's levels.

The game was published by Nintendo in Japan on March 23, 1993, in North America in May 1993, and in Europe on September 12, 1993. It was released late in the NES's lifecycle, ten years after the system launched in Japan. By 1993, most gamers had already moved on to playing primarily on 16-bit systems. However, the game topped the Famitsu sales chart in Japan in May 1993.

== Rereleases ==
=== Remake ===
Kirby: Nightmare in Dream Land
- North American cover art
- Developer: HAL Laboratory
- Publisher: Nintendo
- Director: Shinichi Shimomura
- Producers: Hiroaki Suga; Masayoshi Tanimura
- Designer: Tsuyoshi Wakayama
- Programmer: Tetsuya Abe
- Composers: Jun Ishikawa; Hirokazu Ando
- Platform: Game Boy Advance
- Release: JP: October 25, 2002; NA: December 2, 2002; EU: September 26, 2003; AU: January 23, 2004
- Genre: Platform
- Modes: Single-player, multiplayer

In October 2002, Nintendo released Kirby: Nightmare in Dream Land, an enhanced remake of Kirby's Adventure for the Game Boy Advance (GBA). The core gameplay and level design were left mostly unchanged; minor tweaks include hidden entrances being easier to find and boss fights being more difficult. However, all the graphics and sound effects were redone from scratch to take advantage of the GBA's more powerful hardware. Nightmare in Dream Land adds more gameplay modes, including three new minigames and a cooperative multiplayer mode that supports up to four players. It also features "Meta Knightmare", an unlockable mode in which the player controls Meta Knight. According to Next Generation, 970,000 copies were sold worth $29 million in revenue. The game was sold out in three weeks according to 4Kids Entertainment.

=== Other rereleases ===
A port of Kirby's Adventure was released as a downloadable game for the Nintendo 3DS's eShop in the west on November 17, 2011, and in Japan on April 25, 2012. As a part of the 3D Classics line of rereleases, it has the ability to use the 3DS's stereoscopic 3D functionality and customize controls, and features small tweaked visual details and an improved frame rate in demanding levels. The game is otherwise unchanged.

Kirby's Adventure is available in emulated form through the Virtual Console digital distribution service. It was released on the Wii Virtual Console worldwide in February 2007 and on the Wii U Virtual Console in April 2013. The GBA version was released on the Wii U Virtual Console in 2014. The NES version is also included in Kirby's Dream Collection (2012), a compilation of Kirby video games that commemorates the series' 20th anniversary, and on the NES Classic Edition (2016) dedicated console. It was added to the Nintendo Classics service on February 13, 2019.

== Reception ==
Contemporary reception

Aggregate score
Aggregator	Score
GameRankings	84%

Review scores
Publication	Score
Computer and Video Games	89%
Electronic Gaming Monthly	8/10, 8/10, 8/10, 9/10 (Note: Four individual reviewers at EGM gave overall scores for the game.)
Famitsu	9/10, 8/10, 9/10, 7/10 (Note: Four individual reviewers at Famicom Tsūshin gave overall scores for the game.)
Joypad	90% (ages <12); 78% (ages 12+)
Player One	92%

Most aspects of Kirby's Adventure were well received in contemporary reviews, and critics agreed that it was an improvement over Kirby's Dream Land. Some of the most common highlights by reviewers were the game's innovative copy ability and unique enemy designs, the size and variety of the levels, the tight controls, and the quality and cuteness of the graphics and animation. Nintendo Power thought the game was more difficult than its cute theme may lead gamers to believe. Joypad believed the game was aimed towards younger children and provided two review scores for gamers over and under 12 years old, with the score for children being higher. They compared the game to Tiny Toon Adventures (1991) by Konami, writing that the graphics and sound were better in Tiny Toon Adventures, but Kirby's Adventure had better animation and was more original. Some reviewers complained that the character sprites, especially Kirby's, were too small. GamePro gave Kirby's Adventure the 1993 NES Game of the Year award.

Retrospective reviews for the game's rerelease on the Wii Virtual Console were likewise positive. IGN called it one of the best NES games, and one of the system's greatest visual and auditory technical achievements. Eurogamer believed it to be one of the best Kirby games, and agreed with IGN's sentiments, writing, "Kirby's first and only NES outing is undeniably charming and, with its parallax scrolling and colourful characters, really showcases just how much juice developers were squeezing from the tiny system towards the end of its life." Racketboy notes the advanced visuals: "...the rich colors do not attempt to emulate 16 bit, but instead try to make 8 bit as beautiful as possible." Nintendo Life and GameSpot agreed that the game pushed the NES's technical capabilities. The game's other elements were commended as they were in 1993, including their originality, cuteness, and stage variety. GameSpot wrote that Kirby's Adventure had stood the test of time well, although they felt the game was somewhat short and easy. Others also criticized the game for its length and lack of challenge. For the 3D Classics rerelease, the 3D effect added into the game was seen as underwhelming compared to games like Excitebike and TwinBee which took greater advantage of parallax and depth effects.

=== Nightmare in Dream Land ===
Kirby: Nightmare in Dreamland

Aggregate score
Aggregator	Score
Metacritic	81/100

Review scores
Publication	Score
Electronic Gaming Monthly	8/10, 8/10, 8/10
Famitsu	9/10, 9/10, 9/10, 8/10
Official Nintendo Magazine	7/10
Advance	89%
Cube	9/10
GBA World	4/5
GMR	8/10
G-Force	50%
Total Advance	92%

The new graphics made for the GBA remake were well received. GameSpot highlighted the multiple layers of scrolling, transparency effects, and other visual flair as an improvement over the original. However, they did not think the game was visually up to par with other GBA games such as Yoshi's Island and Castlevania: Harmony of Dissonance. The new minigames and multiplayer modes were also praised for adding new replay value. Since the main gameplay and level design was borrowed from the original, it was generally commended but with some criticism again directed toward its short length and easiness. GameSpy wrote: "the simplicity means you can enjoy it as a light snack instead of a main course such as Metroid Fusion or Castlevania: Harmony of Dissonance." They thought the game would be best enjoyed by children watching the anime airing on television at the time, Kirby: Right Back at Ya!. GameSpot agreed, explaining the game was not as deep as Metroid Fusion or Yoshi's Island, but was suited for "younger players or the young at heart." Eurogamer found it difficult to recommend the game at full price because it was only a remake and also a short game.

== Legacy ==
Game journalists have consistently listed Kirby's Adventure among the best NES games. (Note: GamesRadar+ listed it as the 11th best, IGN, the 27th, Paste, the 15th, Polygon, the 3rd, Complex, the 16th, and Esquire, the 10th.) Official Nintendo Magazine listed it as the 69th best game on a Nintendo console in 2009, and IGN ranked it as 84th on a similar list of best "Nintendo games". In August 2006, Next Generation ranked Nightmare in Dream Land as the 17th best handheld video game of the 2000s.

The Copy Ability introduced in Kirby's Adventure would go on to become a staple mechanic in Kirby's move repertoire. The game was also the first Kirby game to introduce unlockables for finding certain items hidden throughout the levels, which again became a recurring theme in later games. Meta Knight became a recurring playable character in the Super Smash Bros. series, starting with Super Smash Bros. Brawl in 2008.

The multiplayer mode in the remake Nightmare in Dream Land would reprise the yellow coloration used for a second-player Kirby in Kirby's Dream Course (1994), itself the initial coloration for Kirby proposed by Shigeru Miyamoto before the original Kirby's Adventure's release. In subsequent games, a yellow color palette would become a recurring colorization for multiplayer Kirbys in the Kirby and Super Smash Bros. series, often as the default color for the second player.
