= Kirby's Dream Course =

1994 video game

- North American cover art
- Developers: HAL Laboratory; Nintendo EAD
- Publisher: Nintendo
- Director: Takashi Saito
- Producers: Satoru Iwata; Shigeru Miyamoto
- Designers: Shinichi Shimomura; Kensuke Tanabe; Hideki Fujii
- Composer: Hirokazu Ando
- Series: Kirby
- Platform: Super Nintendo Entertainment System
- Release: JP: September 21, 1994; NA: February 1, 1995; EU: August 24, 1995
- Genres: Sports (mini golf)
- Modes: Single-player, multiplayer

Kirby's Dream Course (Note: Known in Japan as Kirby Ball or Kirby Bowl (カービィボウル)) is a 1994 miniature golf video game developed by HAL Laboratory and Nintendo EAD and published by Nintendo for the Super Nintendo Entertainment System (SNES). A spin-off of the Kirby series and the first released for the SNES, players control the pink spherical character Kirby through a series of courses by launching him towards the goal hole at the end. Kirby can hit enemies to collect power-ups that grant him unique abilities, such as those that allow him to destroy certain obstacles or fly around the level.

HAL Laboratory originally designed Dream Course as a standalone game called Special Tee Shot. Though it was previewed in several magazines and displayed on the packaging for the console, HAL replaced the game's original characters with those from the Kirby series following its popularity on the Game Boy. Special Tee Shot was later released for the Satellaview peripheral in Japan. Dream Course received favorable reviews, both at release and retrospectively, for its unique design and absurdity. Some were critical of its high difficulty level and controls. It has been re-released through the Wii and Wii U Virtual Console digital storefronts and the Super NES Classic Edition. A sequel for the Nintendo 64 was in development but later canceled.

== Gameplay ==
The player character Kirby lines up with an enemy character Kabu on the first hole of the first course.

Kirby's Dream Course is a mini golf video game set at an isometric perspective, similar to games such as Marble Madness (1984). Its plot involves Kirby's nemesis King Dedede stealing all of the stars in the night sky. Kirby sets out to stop Dedede and return the stars to the sky.

In single-player, players maneuver Kirby around a miniature golf course by deflecting him towards a specific area of the playfield within a limited number of strokes. Players must set the power, angle, and spin to connect with various enemies found throughout the levels, claiming a star for each enemy defeated. When only one enemy remains, that enemy transforms into the goal hole. Kirby can knock himself into certain enemies to acquire a Copy ability, which can be used to clear courses in a faster period of time. These Copy abilities include Kirby turning into a tornado, a sparking ball that can destroy certain obstacles, and a UFO that allows Kirby to float and move at will for a short time.

The game has eight single-player courses, with eight holes in each. Completing courses awards the player with medals, which can be used to unlock extra features such as alternative versions of courses. The type of medal awarded is based on how well the player performed, with gold being the best.

In multiplayer, players take turns and compete for the most stars in unique courses. The second player controls a yellow palette swap of Kirby named Keeby (キービィ, Kībī), who shares all of Kirby's abilities. Connecting with a star causes it to take the player's color (either pink or yellow), and players can "steal" stars from each other by connecting with them to change their color. The players can attack each other using Copy abilities, potentially forcing one player to skip their turn. The goal hole is worth two stars; when one player reaches the goal, the round ends and both players' stars are tallied. The winner is the player with the most stars at the end of eight rounds.

== Development ==
Kirby's Dream Course began as a standalone game titled Special Tee Shot before it was reworked into a Kirby game.

Kirby's Dream Course was developed by HAL Laboratory and Nintendo EAD and published by Nintendo for the Super Nintendo Entertainment System (SNES). HAL originally designed the game as a standalone title called Special Tee Shot in 1992, which featured its own original characters and art assets. Though it received several previews from magazines and was displayed prominently on the packaging for the console, the company shelved the project following the success of its Kirby series on the Game Boy. HAL later reworked Special Tee Shot into a Kirby game by replacing many of the original characters with those from the Kirby series, and implementing several mechanics to make it fit into the Kirby universe, such as the power-up system.

While Kirby was always intended to be pink, Shigeru Miyamoto assumed during development of Kirby's Dream Land that Kirby was yellow, as there was no color artwork of Kirby available at the time. In reference to this, the developers of Kirby's Dream Course repurposed Miyamoto's color choice as the second player's character, a yellow version of Kirby nicknamed "Keeby". The character's name is a portmanteau of 黄色 kīro "yellow" and カービィ Kābī "Kirby". Following the appearance of an unnamed yellow Kirby in Kirby 64: The Crystal Shards (2000), a yellow color palette became a recurring colorization for additional players playing as a Kirby in the Kirby and Super Smash Bros. series (often as the second player). This palette was named once as "Keeby Yellow" in Kirby's Dream Buffet (2022).

Kirby's Dream Course was released in Japan on September 21, 1994, as Kirby Ball. It was released in North America on February 1, 1995, and in Europe later in the year. Special Tee Shot was later re-released in 1996 for the Satellaview, a peripheral for the Super Famicom that played games via satellite broadcasts. Dream Course was digitally re-released for the Wii Virtual Console in 2007, and the Wii U Virtual Console in Japan in 2013. It is one of thirty games included in the Super NES Classic Edition miniconsole.

In 1995, Nintendo and HAL began work on a sequel named Kirby Ball 64/Kirby Bowl 64 for the then-upcoming Nintendo 64. It was shown off as a playable demo at Nintendo's annual Shoshinkai trade show, alongside Super Mario 64. Kirby Ball 64/Kirby Bowl 64 was designed to take advantage of the system's analog stick to allow for more precise movement, in addition to utilizing gouraud shading for its graphics. It also featured an additional gamemode where the player controlled Kirby on a snowboard. The sequel was never released, though some of its concepts were later implemented into Kirby Air Ride (2003).

== Reception ==
Reception

Aggregate score
Aggregator	Score
GameRankings	77%

Review scores
Publication	Score
Computer and Video Games	4/5
Famitsu	28/40
GamePro	4.5/5
GameSpot	7/10
Hyper	89%
IGN	7.5/10
Mega Fun	61%
Next Generation	4/5
Nintendo Life	8/10
Nintendo Power	3.45/5 (Note: Nintendo Power scored Kirby's Dream Course 3.2/5 for graphics/sound, 3.3/5 for play control, 3.6/5 for challenge, and 3.7/5 for theme/fun.)
Super Game Power	4.5/5
Total!	89/100
Video Games (DE)	80%
VideoGames & Computer Entertainment	8/10
Nintendo Acción	88/100

Kirby's Dream Course received praise for its wacky nature and innovation. GamePro writer Scary Larry claimed it was just as refined and fun to play as earlier games in the Kirby series. A writer for Next Generation found its mini golf-inspired gameplay unique compared to other games, as did a reviewer from Electronic Gaming Monthly. Next Generation and Larry also highlighted Dream Course's complexity, which was uncommon for a golf game at the time. The game's colorful visuals were also praised for their offbeat design and sense of humor. Electronic Gaming Monthly noted that the game's controls required time getting used to; Larry added the accuracy of the player's shots were sometimes questionable and not well-refined. Tom Guise of Computer and Video Games believed its originality made it one of the best SNES games, which Electronic Gaming Monthly agreed with. Javier Abad, a reviewer for Nintendo Acción, commented on the game's difference in design from other games in the series, but felt Kirby fans would enjoy it for the controls and graphical style.

Retrospective commentary on Dream Course has also been favorable. Staff from Nintendo Life compared its silliness to Electronic Arts' Zany Golf (1988), and that it possessed fun gameplay and a balanced level of difficulty. They also believed its isometric perspective worked well, and its graphics were aesthetically pleasing. IGN's Lucas M. Thomas believed Dream Course's unique concept made it incomparable to other games. Thomas and GameSpot's Frank Provo both enjoyed its power-ups for their usefulness and novelty. USgamer writer Nadia Oxford applauded its abnormal level design and comical presentation, and said it offered a break from the more action-oriented games on the console: "Kirby's Dream Course isn't the most exciting game on the SNES Classic Edition, but it's cute, fuzzy, and fun – much like the big pink macaron who runs the course." IGN ranked the game 38th on their "Top 100 SNES Games of All Time."

== See also ==
- List of Kirby media
- 1994 in video games
