= Kirby's Dream Land =

1992 video game

- European box art
- Developer: HAL Laboratory
- Publisher: Nintendo
- Director: Masahiro Sakurai
- Producer: Makoto Kanai
- Artist: Masahiro Sakurai
- Composer: Jun Ishikawa
- Series: Kirby
- Platform: Game Boy
- Release: JP: April 27, 1992; NA: August 1992; UK: December 1992
- Genre: Platform
- Mode: Single-player

Kirby's Dream Land (Note: Japanese: 星のカービィ, Hepburn: Hoshi no Kābī; lit. "Kirby of the Stars") is a 1992 platform game developed by HAL Laboratory and published by Nintendo for the Game Boy. It is the first game in the Kirby series and marks the debut of Kirby. It introduced many conventions that would appear in later games in the series. The game follows Kirby as he goes through five levels to retrieve the Sparkling Stars and food of Dream Land from King Dedede.

Kirby's Dream Land was the debut game of designer Masahiro Sakurai. He intended it to be a simple game that could be easy to pick up and play by those unfamiliar with action games. For more advanced players, he offered additional optional challenges such as a hard mode and the ability to edit Kirby's maximum HP and starting number of lives. Kirby's Dream Land was re-released on the Nintendo 3DS via the Virtual Console in 2011; it is also one of the games included in the compilation game Kirby's Dream Collection for the Wii, released to celebrate the series' 20th anniversary. The game was included as part of the Nintendo Classics service in February 2023. The game was the highest grossing in the series, with 5,130,000 copies sold, until being beaten out 30 years later by Kirby and the Forgotten Land.

== Gameplay ==
Kirby battling Whispy Woods, the boss of the first stage, Green Greens

Kirby's Dream Land is a side-scrolling action-platformer. Like many other platformers of the 8-bit and 16-bit era of video games, levels are played on a two-dimensional plane in which the protagonist, Kirby, has six health points and can move left or right as well as jump. Kirby's main method of attack is to inhale enemies and objects into his mouth, after which the player can choose to swallow or spit them out as a star-shaped projectile attack. In addition to running and jumping, Kirby can fly by inflating himself with a mouthful of air and flapping his arms. Flying can be done indefinitely; however, while flying, Kirby's only method of attack is to release the air puff held in his mouth which cancels his flight.

The game consists of a total of five levels. Levels are made up of a series of large "rooms" connected by doors that lead Kirby to different areas, rather than the single continuous corridors typical of platformers at the time. Some of these doors lead to hidden areas or alternate pathways through the level. The doors act as checkpoints returning the player to the beginning of a "room" should they die rather than starting the level over. The goal of the game is to clear the level by defeating the boss at the end. If Kirby touches a harmful enemy or obstacle, he loses one or more of his health points, depending on the enemy or obstacle he touched. The player starts with a number of lives, which are lost if Kirby loses all of his health or falls into a bottomless pit. Kirby can recover lost health by eating food, found across the stage. The player will receive a Game Over upon losing all of their lives, although they can continue from the beginning of the current stage by selecting "Continue".

Unlike the copy abilities of later games, Kirby's Dream Land has more traditional power-ups that offer Kirby temporary abilities when he picks them up, although they are not a big part of gameplay. These often appear in the form of food, such as Spicy Curry that gives Kirby fire breath or a Mint Leaf (Sweet Potato in the Japanese version) that lets Kirby fire air puffs rapidly without losing flight. At the end of each level is a boss Kirby must fight to obtain one of the Sparkling Stars. Most bosses are fought by sucking up small objects or projectiles created by the boss' attacks and spitting them back at the boss. The third boss, Kaboola, is fought using an unlimited version of the Mint Leaf item, incorporating shoot 'em up elements. The last level before the final boss consists of a boss rush, where Kirby must fight all of the game's bosses again going through a short area based on that boss's home level. There are also many mini-bosses during the levels.

Like many 1980s-era platformers, the player can accumulate points by defeating enemies and collecting items, with an extra life granted when the player has enough points. However, because Kirby's Dream Land lacks a save function, scores are not recorded. Also, there are no save files, so the player has to start over again when the Game Boy is turned off, if the player chooses to return to the title screen after a game over, or if the player resets the game. Once the game has been completed, a code is offered to play an optional extra game, in which the difficulty is significantly increased. Completing the extra game offered a second code that lets the player adjust lives and vitality settings to play an easier or even harder game, and listen to music and sound effects freely.

== Plot ==
Kirby's Dream Land is set in the fictional country of Dream Land, which is located on a tiny star-shaped planet far, far away from Earth, named "Planet Popstar" in later games. The Dream Landers are a very peaceful and carefree people that use their magical Sparkling Stars to play and work among the heavens. One night, under the cover of darkness, the gluttonous King Dedede and his minions swoop down from his castle on Mt. Dedede and steal all the food in Dream Land, as well as the Sparkling Stars, which the King distributes among his minions. Without the Sparkling Stars, the Dream Landers can no longer harvest food, and begin to go hungry. As the residents are discussing what to do, a spry little boy named Kirby flies in on the spring breeze, and volunteers to defeat King Dedede and retrieve the food and Stars. Upon successfully doing so, he uses the magic of the Sparkling Stars to transform into a hot air balloon and return the King's stolen food back to the people of Dream Land.

== Development ==
Kirby's Dream Land was developed by Masahiro Sakurai of HAL Laboratory. Much of the programming was done on a Twin Famicom, a Nintendo-licensed console produced by Sharp Corporation that combined a Famicom and a Famicom Disk System in one unit. As the Twin Famicom did not have keyboard support, a trackball was used in tandem with an on-screen keyboard to input values; Sakurai described the process, which he assumed was "the way [game programming] was done" at the time, as similar to "using a lunchbox to make lunch."

Kirby initially was a dummy character that the developers used until they could define a more sophisticated image. However the designers grew to like Kirby so much that they decided to keep him instead of using a more advanced character. At the time he was to be named Popopo (ポポポ), and the game was named Popopo of the Spring Breeze (はるかぜポポポ, Harukaze Popopo). The title was later changed to Twinkle Popo (ティンクル・ポポ, Tinkuru Popo), which was still being used late enough in development that box art and advertising material was produced with this name.

Originally, HAL Laboratory was to publish the game independently, but due to the low number of advance orders, the release was delayed, and HAL asked Nintendo to publish the game. Under Nintendo's supervision, the game received an extensive marketing campaign, and its title was changed. In order to give the character more international appeal, the developers decided to change Popopo's name, so they polled Nintendo of America for suggestions. The name "Kirby" was eventually chosen partly in honor of American lawyer John Kirby, who defended Nintendo in the Universal City Studios, Inc. v. Nintendo Co., Ltd. case, and partly because the harsh-sounding name contrasted amusingly with the character's cute appearance. The final Japanese title of the game was Hoshi no Kirby, or Kirby of the Stars, which became the name of the greater franchise.

During the development of what was referred to as Twinkle Popo, there was some initial confusion over the color scheme of Popopo/Kirby. Sakurai had always intended him to be pink, and the concept art reflects this. However, Kirby was not pink in the game itself, as the Game Boy system had a monochrome display. Other members of the development team were unaware of Kirby's coloration; in particular, Shigeru Miyamoto initially thought that he was yellow. Although pink is still Kirby's main color, later games have used a yellow Kirby (nicknamed "Keeby") to represent the second player in multiplayer, starting in Kirby's Dream Course (1994). When Kirby of the Stars was released in Japan, it featured a pink Kirby on its box art. However, Nintendo of America designed the North American box art and advertisements with a white Kirby based on the game's grey-scale visuals.

The music and sound effects were created by Jun Ishikawa, who has worked on several Kirby titles in the decades since. According to Ishikawa, he was given the task due to his prior experience composing for Nintendo Entertainment System titles. Because he felt that complex chords did not sound good on the Game Boy's limited sound hardware, he intentionally wrote music with simple chords and melodies. Ishikawa's work on Kirby's Dream Land was influential for the sound of later Kirby games.

== Reception ==
Contemporary reviews

Review scores
Publication	Score
Aktueller Software Markt	10/12
Game Zone	80/100
Joystick	96%
Power Play	72%
Video Games	70%
Weekly Famicom Tsūshin	5/10, 5/10, 6/10, 6/10

Kirby's Dream Land has received generally positive reception. Upon release, Nintendo Power editors George and Bob shared generally positive opinions of the Kirby's Dream Land; George called the game fun, owing its quality to its excellent play control and well thought out concept, while Bob stated that it is deceptively simple looking, when it in fact features a decent challenge for more experienced gamers. In Weekly Famicom Tsūshin, three of the reviewers said that it was mostly a typical action game with one saying it was as easy to get into as it was to get out of. While two of these reviewers said the ability to suck in enemies and shoot them out like bullets was unique, one said this drew inspiration from Yoshi from Super Mario World (1990).

The reviewers complimented the character of Kirby, with one reviewer saying they kept returning to the game just to see his animation cycles. Stephan Englhart of Video Games said the game had beautifully illustrated graphics and that Kirby "has my vote for sprite of the month." He said that he only recommended the game to beginner audiences as the everything else was mediocre, ranging from the games level design and low difficulty making the game too simple and monotonous. GamePro complimented the graphics and fresh gameplay while finding the sound only average. Olivier Carali in Joystick said the game was a "gem in the platform genre" writing that the music, animation and graphics were "cute, brilliant and endearing." Joystick's only issue was the game's lack of difficulty, suggesting it was more suitable for younger players. A review in the German magazine Aktueller Software Markt wrote that the abilities to swallow air, float up, dodge, catch and spt out enemies gave it a very unique appeal. The review disliked the lack of any level select or level password feature. Knut Gollert of Power Play impresses above all with its originality and that players can do much more with Kirby than they initially might think. The reviewer found that the game was ultimately brought down by poor level design and low difficulty.

Kirby's Dream Land topped the Japanese Famitsu sales charts from May 1992 to June 1992, and in the United States topped Babbage's Game Boy sales chart in October 1992. The game sold more than 1 million units worldwide as of March 1993. By 1997, 4.6 million units had been sold. As of 2010, it has sold in excess of 5 million copies worldwide; Gamasutra cited its new style of gameplay for its success. At the time, it was HAL Laboratory's most successful game. Gamasutra's Osamu Inoue attributed the game's success to Satoru Iwata, formerly an employee of HAL Laboratory, who Inoue comments has a "simple-minded passion for creating games".

Retrospective reception

Aggregate score
Aggregator	Score
GameRankings	62%

Review scores
Publication	Score
AllGame	4/5
IGN	8/10
Nintendo Life	7/10
Pocket Gamer	2.5/5

Retrospectively, it holds an aggregate score of 62% on GameRankings with nine reviews, making it the 17th best Game Boy game. Game Informer's Ben Reeves called it the 14th best Game Boy game and felt that it was a relaxing game. Author Wendy Despain used Kirby's Dream Land's plot as an example of how early platform games' plots progressed, which she collectively described as "the main character needing to reach a villain to put right a wrong." Humongous Life's Jonathan Wahlgren called it a strong game, but felt it to be "too elementary". GamesRadar's Brett Elston did an article on its music, specifically giving praise to the final boss music, stating that it is the "only song in the original Kirby that had a sense of challenge or conflict instead of skipping through a field of floating cakes." Nadia Oxford of 1UP.com praised it for its unique platforming mechanics, describing it as the start of a "gluttonous legend". Allgame's Joshua Crystal called it a "great game for beginner players and ones that enjoy a fun, but short, experience."

In an article detailing various Kirby series video games, IGN stated that it was a decent platformer, but basic compared to later games. IGN's Lucas M. Thomas and Craig Harris included Kirby's Dream Land in their wishlist for a hypothetical "Virtual Console" for the Nintendo 3DS, commenting that its inclusion would be based on nostalgia rather than it feeling "new and sensational". They also added that original characters like Kirby were the stars of the Game Boy rather than established characters such as Link, Mario, Samus Aran, and Pit. They would again praise Kirby's Dream Land for being an original game in their "History of the Game Boy" article, adding that while "attitude" was common in new platforming mascots, Kirby was cheery and adorable, while the game featured "breezy, casual gameplay and lighthearted atmosphere". GameSpy's Gerald Villoria, Brian Altano, and Ryan Scott called it "basic" compared to later games in the series, adding that it lacked a sense of danger because Kirby could fly. GamesRadar listed Kirby's Dream Land and its sequel as two of the games they want in the 3DS Virtual Console.

== Sequels ==
Kirby's Dream Land has spawned numerous sequels across several video game consoles. The first direct sequel, Kirby's Adventure, released on the Nintendo Entertainment System, introduced the ability to steal powers from enemies, an ability which would become a staple of the series following it. The series has featured several spin-offs, in differing genres including a racing game Kirby Air Ride, pinball game Kirby's Pinball Land, and an action-golf hybrid game Kirby's Dream Course. Kirby's Dream Land would receive a Game Boy sequel in 1995, Kirby's Dream Land 2, which incorporated the copy mechanic from Kirby's Adventure.

Kirby and King Dedede appear as playable characters in the fighting game series Super Smash Bros. Both characters have alternate costumes that give them a monochrome appearance reminiscent of the Game Boy's graphics. The "Green Greens" stage, first appearing in Super Smash Bros. Melee, is based on this game's first level. The "Dream Land GB" stage, introduced in Super Smash Bros. for Nintendo 3DS, transitions between multiple locations from Kirby's Dream Land as displayed through a monochromatic Game Boy screen.
