= Masahiro Sakurai =

Japanese video game designer (born 1970)

- 桜井 政博
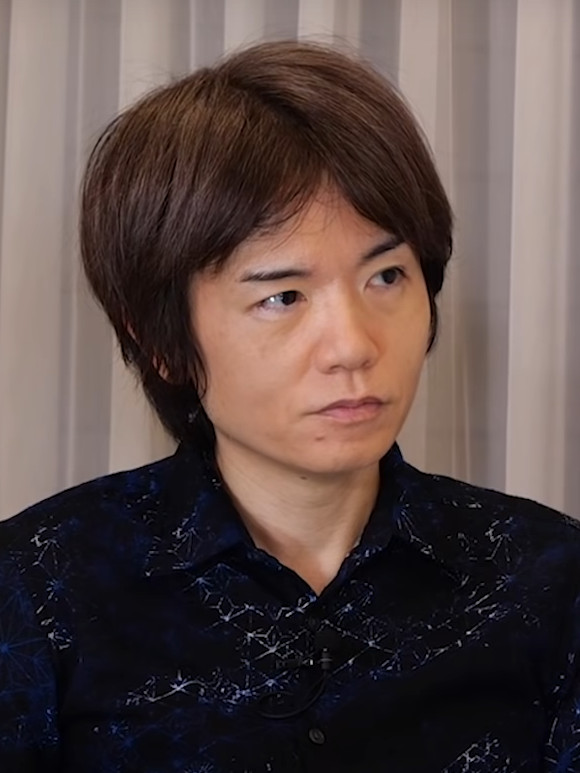
- Sakurai in 2021
- Born: August 3, 1970 (age 56); Musashimurayama, Tokyo, Japan
- Occupations: Game director; game designer; scenario writer
- Employers: HAL Laboratory (1989–2003); Sora Ltd. (2005–present)
- Works: Kirby; Super Smash Bros.; Meteos; Kid Icarus: Uprising
- Spouse: Michiko Sakurai

Masahiro Sakurai (桜井 政博, Sakurai Masahiro; born August 3, 1970) is a Japanese video game director and game designer best known as the creator of the Kirby and Super Smash Bros. series. Apart from his work on those series, he also led the design of Meteos in 2005 and directed Kid Icarus: Uprising in 2012. He also created and developed Kirby: Right Back at Ya!, an anime based on the Kirby series which aired from 2001 to 2003.

Formerly an employee of HAL Laboratory, Sakurai left the company in 2003 and in 2005 with his wife Michiko Sakurai (also ex-HAL Laboratory) founded their company Sora Ltd. (Note: 有限会社ソラ, Yūgen-gaisha Sora), under which they work on a freelance basis. He was also an author of a weekly column for Famitsu magazine from 2003 to 2021, and has done voice acting work in some of his games, most notably providing the voice of King Dedede in Kirby 64: The Crystal Shards and the Super Smash Bros. series. From 2022 to 2024, Sakurai ran an educational YouTube channel, Masahiro Sakurai on Creating Games, which discussed various topics in game design and his career.

== Career ==
Masahiro Sakurai was born on August 3, 1970, in Musashimurayama, Tokyo, Japan. One of Sakurai's earliest experiences in the video game industry began when he worked for HAL Laboratory, where he created the character Kirby at age 19 and directed his first title, Kirby's Dream Land.

Sakurai left HAL on August 5, 2003. He explained in an interview with Nintendo Dream that he felt it would be difficult to create new projects while staying at HAL due to the direction of the gaming industry, where the risk of failure was high. While he was not being pressured by HAL to create Kirby sequels, he noted increasing tension within the industry as a whole: "It was tough for me to see that every time I made a new game, people automatically assumed that a sequel was coming. Even if it's a sequel, lots of people have to give their all to make a game, but some people think the sequel process happens naturally."

Soon after, Sakurai began working on a project with Q Entertainment, along with Tetsuya Mizuguchi. This collaboration resulted in Meteos in 2005, a puzzle game for the Nintendo DS. On September 30, 2005, Sakurai announced that he had formed his own company, Sora Ltd. Two games were announced to be in development but no information on the titles had been divulged. As for the future of the Super Smash Bros. series, Nintendo and HAL Laboratory president Satoru Iwata, during Nintendo's E3 2005 press conference, promised an online iteration of the game would come to the Wii.

In issue #885 of Famitsu magazine, Sakurai revealed that he would be serving as a director and game designer on Super Smash Bros. Brawl for the Wii. Super Smash Bros. Brawl was released in 2008, after personnel borrowed from 19 different developer studios assisted in development. Sakurai had been updating daily the Super Smash Bros Brawl website called the Smash Bros. Dojo. Starting a year previous the release, he revealed Brawl secrets and gameplay content through the site. The Smash Bros. Dojo had regular updates from May 22, 2007, to April 14, 2008.

The logo of Sora Ltd.

On the final day of updates, it was revealed that Sakurai provided the voice for King Dedede in Kirby 64: The Crystal Shards as well as Dedede in Super Smash Bros. Brawl. He and his company, Sora Ltd. alongside Nintendo, started a first-party studio, Project Sora, which was 72% owned by Nintendo and 28% owned by Sora Ltd. It was revealed at E3 2010 that Sakurai and Project Sora were working on Kid Icarus: Uprising for the Nintendo 3DS. Project Sora was closed and ended development on June 30, 2012. At E3 2011, Nintendo announced that Sakurai was working on Super Smash Bros. for Nintendo 3DS and Wii U. Sakurai began development of the title upon the release of Kid Icarus: Uprising in March 2012.

In February 2013, Sakurai was diagnosed with calcific tendinitis near his right shoulder, which caused him substantial pain whenever he moved his arm. He mentioned that this could effectively slow down his work, as he does some of his game testing himself.

In a January 2015 column in Weekly Famitsu, Sakurai alluded to the possibility of retirement, expressing doubt that he would be able to continue making games if his career continued to be as stressful as it was. In December 2015, Sakurai once again stated that he was not sure if there would be another game in the Smash Bros. series, prior to Super Smash Bros. Ultimate being released in 2018 with Sakurai once again as director.

On March 14, 2022, Sakurai was awarded Best Creator by Weekly Famitsu. Sakurai also announced that he was working on a new project not related to game production. In March 2025, Sakurai announced that he had been awarded the AMD Award for Lifetime Achievement.

=== Masahiro Sakurai on Creating Games ===
Masahiro Sakurai on Creating Games
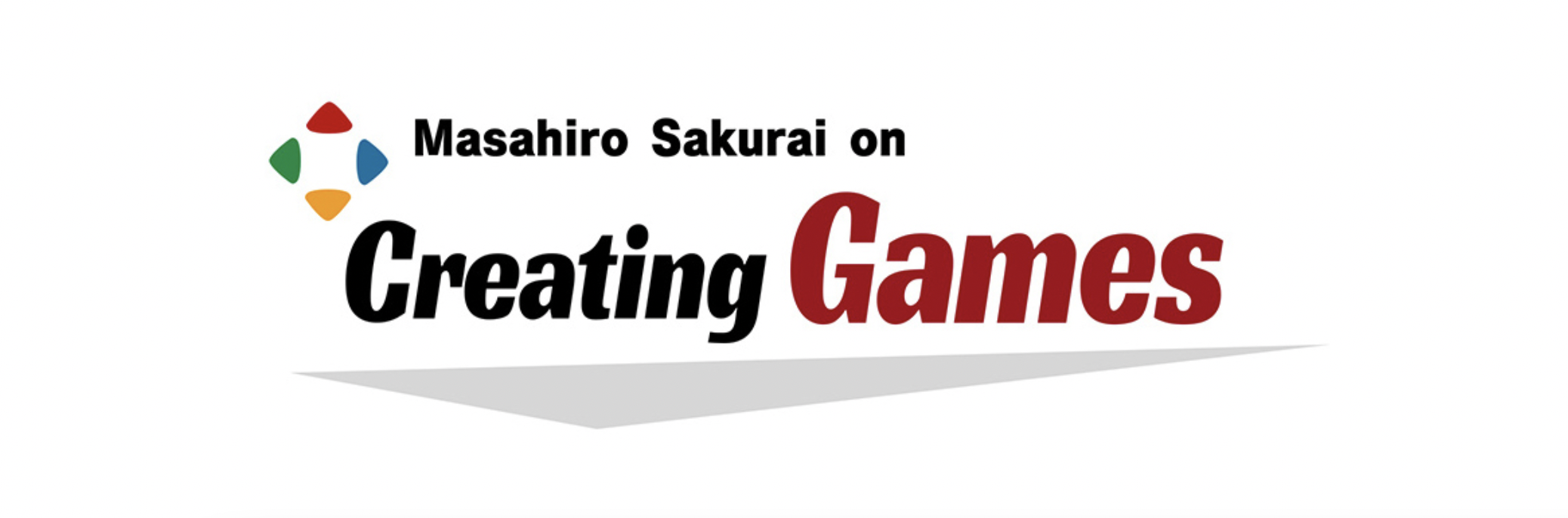

YouTube information
- Channels: Masahiro Sakurai on Creating Games; 桜井政博のゲーム作るには
- Years active: 2022–2024
- Genres: Video game design; development
- Subscribers: 653,000 (English); 840,000 (Japanese)
- Views: 22.2 million (English); 95.9 million (Japanese)
- Last updated: July 21, 2025

Sakurai launched Masahiro Sakurai on Creating Games, (Note: 桜井政博のゲーム作るには, Sakurai Masahiro no Gēmu Tsukuru ni wa) a YouTube channel in both English and Japanese, in August 2022. The channel hosts educational content focused on game development and design, as well as Sakurai's career. Sakurai stated that he created the channel out of a desire to reach more people with his lessons, as he had previously been asked to give lectures on game design at schools. Sakurai additionally noted that other educational venues for game developers, such as the Game Developers Conference, focused on more advanced, technical details rather than more basic principles.

Sakurai began work on the channel immediately after the release of Sora in Super Smash Bros. Ultimate in October 2021. Sakurai wrote and recorded all 256 of the channel's videos himself before beginning work on Kirby Air Riders in April 2022, and contracted Hike Inc. for editing and 8-4 for English localization. The opening and ending jingles for the channel were composed by Yuzo Koshiro. Sakurai estimated that the total production cost of the channel was ¥90,000,000, which he paid entirely out of pocket, as he chose not to monetize the channel and did not receive any income from it.

Less than a day after its launch, the English edition of his channel gained over 200,000 subscribers. In 2023, the Computer Entertainment Supplier's Association announced that Sakurai had won the Game Design and Visual Arts awards for his channel. The association cited his efforts to share his knowledge in an easily understood manner. In March 2025, Sakurai announced that he had been listed as a recipient of the Agency for Cultural Affairs' annual Art Encouragement Prize for New Artists for his work on his channel.

== Works ==
=== Video games ===
Year	Title	Role(s)
1991	Trax	Animator, specifications
1992	Kirby's Dream Land	Director, lead artist
1993	Kirby's Adventure	Director
1996	Kirby Super Star	Director
1999	Super Smash Bros.	Director
2000	Kirby 64: The Crystal Shards	Voice actor (King Dedede)
2001	Super Smash Bros. Melee	Director
2002	Kirby: Nightmare in Dream Land	Director
2003	Kirby Air Ride	Director
2004	Kirby & the Amazing Mirror	Special advisor
2005	Meteos	Game designer
2006	Sodatete! Kouchuu Ouja Mushiking	Game designer
2008	Super Smash Bros. Brawl	Director, voice actor (King Dedede)
2012	Kid Icarus: Uprising	Director, scenario
2014	Super Smash Bros. for Nintendo 3DS and Wii U	Director, voice actor (King Dedede)
2018	Super Smash Bros. Ultimate	Director, voice actor (King Dedede)
2025	Kirby Air Riders	Director

=== Anime ===
Year	Title	Role(s)
2001–2003	Kirby: Right Back at Ya!	Creator, developer, supervisor

== Personal life ==
Sakurai is married to Michiko Sakurai. She has worked on the graphical user interface for many of his games, including Kirby Air Ride, Meteos, and the Super Smash Bros. series.

In July 2009, Sakurai adopted a female Scottish Fold cat named Fukurashi, who he often featured in his Famitsu column. She died in February 2026.
