= Kirby of the Stars: The Story of Dedede Who Lives in Pupupu =

Japanese manga series

- Cover of the first tankōbon volume, featuring Kirby and other characters

星のカービィ デデデでプププなものがたり (Hoshi no Kirby: Dedede de Pupupu na Monogatari)
- Genre: Comedy, fantasy
- Manga
- Written by: Hirokazu Hikawa
- Published by: Shogakukan
- English publisher: NA: Viz Media
- Magazine: CoroCoro Comic; (May 1994 - November 2006); CoroCoro Aniki (December 2017 – present)
- Original run: Initial run May 1994 – November 2006; Continued run December 2017 – present
- Volumes: 25

Kirby of the Stars: The Story of Dedede Who Lives in Pupupu (星のカービィ デデデでプププなものがたり, Hoshi no Kirby: Dedede de Pupupu na Monogatari) is a Japanese manga series based on the video game series, written and illustrated by Hirokazu Hikawa. The series follows the adventures of Kirby and his friend Chirby, who are on a quest to return the Star Rod, the legendary treasure of Dream Land.

The manga ran in Shogakukan's monthly CoroCoro Comic from May 1994 through November 2006, and was released in 25 individual tankōbon volumes. A special chapter was published in the December 2017 winter issue of CoroCoro Aniki, where it has been continued to be serialized. Viz Media planned to release the manga in North America in 2010, but it was cancelled. The manga was later published as a "best-of" collection with new chapters, which was published in English as Kirby Manga Mania by Viz Media.

== Characters ==
Aside from Kirby himself, the manga features many of the characters from the Kirby series of games, including Meta Knight, King Dedede, and many of the regular enemies and bosses from the games as well.

== Publication ==
Kirby of the Stars was originally serialized in CoroCoro Comic from May 1994 to November 2006. It has been released into 25 volumes, which have over 10 million copies in circulation. The December 2017 winter issue of CoroCoro Aniki featured the series' first new chapter in 11 years, and the next issue would also feature a new chapter. The July 2018 issue revealed that Hikawa was resuming the Kirby manga. CoroCoro Aniki ended publication in print in the spring 2021 issue, where Kirby and other manga would continue to be published online.

=== Kirby Manga Mania ===
At New York Anime Festival 2009, Viz Media revealed that they would be releasing the Kirby manga in North America, with a planned release date of September 7, 2010. The date was pushed back, and was eventually cancelled.

The series would later be published as a "best-of" collection, featuring a selection of chapters that Hikawa considers the best, in addition to bonus comics. It was published in English as Kirby Manga Mania by Viz Media, with the first volume being published on June 8, 2021.

- Kirby Manga Mania volume 1 (ISBN 978-1-9747-2234-1, 2021-06-08)
- Kirby Manga Mania volume 2 (ISBN 978-1-9747-2235-8, 2021-09-14)
- Kirby Manga Mania volume 3 (ISBN 978-1-9747-2236-5, 2021-12-14)
- Kirby Manga Mania volume 4 (ISBN 978-1-9747-2241-9, 2022-03-08)
- Kirby Manga Mania volume 5 (ISBN 978-1-9747-3203-6, 2022-08-09)
- Kirby Manga Mania volume 6 (ISBN 978-1-9747-3432-0, 2023-07-11)
- Kirby Manga Mania volume 7 (ISBN 978-1-9747-3433-7, 2024-07-09)
- Kirby Manga Mania volume 8 (ISBN 978-1-9747-5530-1, 2025-07-08)
- Kirby Manga Mania volume 9 (ISBN 978-1-9747-6589-8, 2026-07-14)

== Reception ==
Reviewers have mostly criticized the manga for its repetitiveness, characterization, and lack of character development and plot, with its fast-paced slapstick comedy being attributed to its target audience of children.
