= Kirby (character) =

Protagonist in the Kirby series

- Kirby character
- Artwork of Kirby from Kirby Super Star Ultra
- First game: Kirby's Dream Land (1992)
- Created by: Masahiro Sakurai
- Designed by: Masahiro Sakurai
- Voiced by: Makiko Ohmoto (1999–present)

In-universe information
- Species: Kirby
- Gender: Unknown (in Japan); Male (in localizations)
- Home: Dream Land, Planet Popstar

Kirby (Japanese: カービィ, Hepburn: Kābī; Japanese pronunciation: [kaːbiː]) is the titular character and protagonist of the Kirby series by HAL Laboratory. He first appeared in Kirby's Dream Land (1992), a platform game for the Game Boy. Since then, Kirby has appeared in over 50 games, ranging from action platformers to puzzle, racing, and pinball, and has been featured as a playable character in every installment of the Super Smash Bros. series (1999–present). He has also starred in his own anime and manga series. Since 1999, he has been voiced by Makiko Ohmoto.

Kirby's signature skill is his ability to inhale objects or creatures and spit them out as projectiles, as well as the ability to suck in air to float over obstacles. His Copy Ability grants him the power to adopt the abilities of the creatures he inhales, while also wearing various costumes or transforming his shape. He uses these abilities to rescue various lands, such as his homeworld Planet Popstar, from evil forces and antagonists, such as Dark Matter or Nightmare. On these adventures, he often crosses paths with his rivals, King Dedede and Meta Knight. In virtually all of his appearances, Kirby is depicted as a cheerful, innocent, and food-loving character.

Kirby has been regarded as one of the most iconic video game characters of all time, as well as one of the cutest and most lovable. He has achieved high popularity with gamers in Japan and the United States. He has also been praised for being one of the most versatile characters, due to starring in a large catalogue of games that cuts across a variety of video game genres.

== Concept and creation ==
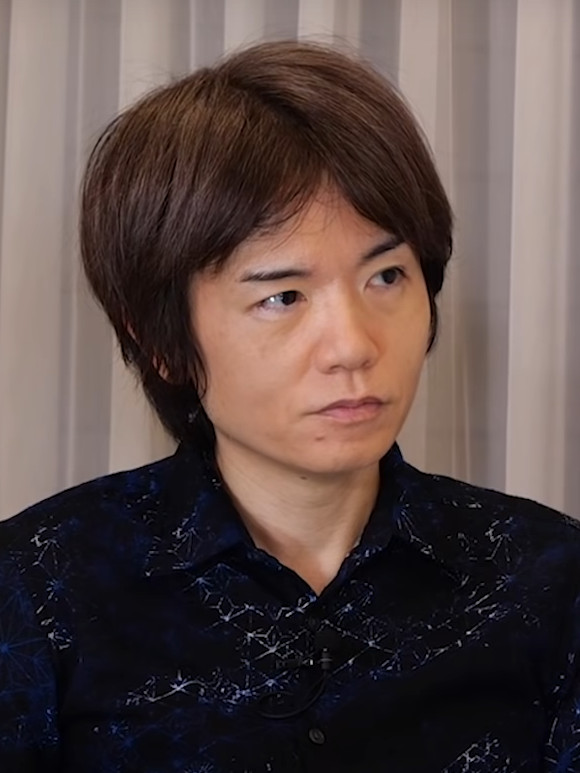
Masahiro Sakurai, creator of Kirby

Kirby was created by Masahiro Sakurai as the player character of the 1992 video game Kirby's Dream Land. Sakurai conceived the idea around May 1990 at the age of 19 while he was working at HAL Laboratory. The character's design was intended to serve as a placeholder graphic for the game's original protagonist in early development and thus was given a simplistic ball-like appearance. Sakurai switched to the placeholder design after deciding that it served the character better. The character was known as Popopo (ポポポ) during development, as the first game was planned to be titled Harukaze Popopo (lit. "Spring Breeze Popopo", or "Popopo of the Spring Breeze"). The game was later renamed to Twinkle Popo; however, after Nintendo became involved in its release, Nintendo and HAL chose to change the name of the game and its protagonist so that it would appeal to Western audiences. The name "Kirby" was chosen from a list of potential names provided by Nintendo of America. Shigeru Miyamoto stated that "Kirby" was chosen partly in honor of American lawyer John Kirby, who defended Nintendo in the Universal City Studios, Inc. v. Nintendo Co., Ltd. case, and partly because the harsh-sounding name contrasted amusingly with the character's cute appearance.

Reflecting on Kirby's design, Sakurai said that he wanted to create "a cute main character who everyone will love". Satoru Iwata added that Kirby was given a simple, circular design so that anyone would be able to draw him. The BBC quoted Negative World: "Kirby has a great design. He's expressive, iconic, instantly-recognisable, and easy for kids to draw."

Kirby appears white in Kirby's Dream Land due to the grayscale palette of the Game Boy system. Sakurai always intended the character to be pink, though this was unknown to the development team at first; in particular, Miyamoto thought that Kirby would have been yellow based upon similar characters, but thought that pink was a more distinctive choice. Kirby appears white in the game's North American promotional materials and artwork to reflect the character's in-game appearance. Miyamoto's color choice was repurposed in some games for secondary players.

In a miniseries on YouTube where he discussed the development of Kirby's Dream Land, Sakurai said that he wanted Kirby to fly because he thought it would be unfair for the player to lose a life by missing a jump. He also had the idea of Kirby using his tongue to grab enemies similarly to Yoshi, but then decided to have him inhale and spit them out instead. For the development of the second game titled Kirby's Adventure, Iwata said that the team had started with over 40 abilities before reducing them to the number in the final game. These originally included the ability to shrink, create blocks, ride a rocket, and also an animal ability that involved scratching and biting enemies.

HAL Laboratory executive director, Shinya Kumazaki, said that Kirby is a neutral character, designed to reflect the player's emotions in the game, and for this reason, he does not express strong emotions that could conflict with the player. For a period of time beginning with 2002's Kirby: Nightmare in Dream Land, Kirby consistently appeared in North American promotional material with a more serious expression than in Japan, where his expression was cheerful. Kumazaki said that the more battle-ready appearance was intended to appeal to a wider audience in North America, based on feedback and market research from Nintendo of America. Discussing Kirby's portrayal in Nightmare in Dream Land, Sakurai said that Kirby's voice acting had been purposefully restricted because clear speech would have seemed unnatural for a pixelated sprite character, and could typecast him as a particular type of character.

Kirby's spherical shape presented certain challenges when transitioning him to a 3D character. Tatsuya Kamiyama at HAL Laboratory explained that it was difficult to determine which direction he was facing when viewed from behind, which meant that facing enemies correctly in order to inhale and spit them out could create frustration. This was particularly problematic for ranged attacks, so for Kirby and the Forgotten Land a subtle, automatic homing system was developed to help the player target nearby enemies. Kumazaki said that the Mouthful Mode concept began by asking what Kirby is and exploring his shape-shifting nature, as the team wanted him to have inhuman abilities. He also said that although Kirby's Mouthful Mode appears to give him the ability to hold anything in his mouth, there are rules governing what he can swallow. During development, the team focused on defining the different shapes he could make and what he could do with the shapes, rather than giving him new powers. He also explained that the core concept of each game in the series is to make Kirby the hero, although the character has no aspirations or sense of morality due to being a pure, blank slate character.

=== Portrayal ===
Since Kirby 64: The Crystal Shards (2000), Kirby has been voiced by Japanese voice actress Makiko Ohmoto. She also voiced him in every title in the Super Smash Bros. series, beginning with the first Super Smash Bros. game in 1999.

== Characteristics ==
Kirby hails from Planet Popstar, a yellow star, and spends most of his time in a territory called Dream Land. He has a pink, spherical, body with small stubby arms and large red feet. His body composition has not been revealed, but Kumazaki stated that his animation is based on "a human running energetically, with the thighs, knees, and ankles invisible, but nevertheless accounted for". His body is soft and flexible, allowing him to stretch or flatten and adopt different shapes, open his mouth very wide to inhale foes, or inflate himself with air and fly. Despite this malleability, certain parts of Kirby do not stretch in order to maintain his cuteness, such as the distance between his two eyes and between his eyes and mouth. Kirby is characterised by his childlike innocence and his insatiable appetite. When he swallows enemies, Kirby does not digest them in his stomach. Instead, they disappear and reappear somewhere in the game world. Kirby's official height is 20 cm (about 8 in).

Kirby's gender is listed as "unknown" in the Kirby series encyclopedia Hoshi no Kābī Pupupu Taizen (星のカービィプププ大全). Sakurai wrote Kirby's profile, which also lists the character's gender as "unknown" and once jokingly questioned whether Kirby could actually be female. Likewise, Makiko Ohmoto stated that Kirby's gender is unknown and explained that she performs the character just as "Kirby" without caring about the character's gender. The English manual for Kirby's Dream Land refers to Kirby as a "little boy", whereas the Japanese version uses wakamono (若者), which translates to a gender-neutral "youngster" or "young person", though is more frequently used for males.

When asked what sort of being Kirby is, Kumazaki said that he is an "always-shifting and mysterious individual". HAL Laboratory producer Tadashi Kamitake said that Kirby has a unique personality, but is also like a blank sheet of paper, as he can transform into anything that he sucks up. He explained that because he embodies these two opposite extremes, he can be an indestructible superhero while also being a friend.

=== Abilities ===
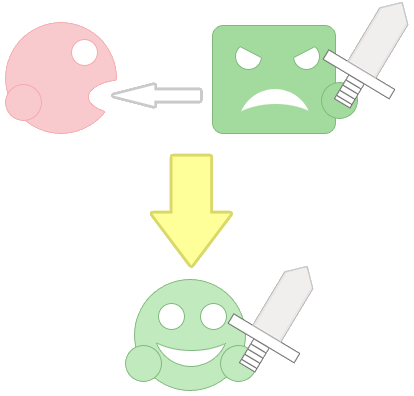
Kirby can gain the properties of enemies or objects he eats. For example; by inhaling a sword-wielding foe, Kirby becomes a skilled swordsman: Sword Kirby.

Kirby's signature ability involves inhaling enemies and objects, then either swallowing them or spitting them out with incredible force. He also has the ability to fly. Kirby's Adventure introduced the Copy Ability, allowing Kirby to mimic the abilities of his foes by swallowing them, giving him a variety of powers, such as breathing fire. Instead of finding and using power-ups, Kirby uses his enemies as power-ups. Kirby Super Star expanded on the concept of the Copy Ability by introducing multi-functional techniques for each ability. In Kirby Super Star, Kirby can sacrifice his current Copy Ability to create a "Helper", which can be controlled by the game or a second player. Kirby Star Allies (2018) has a similar mechanic where he can create small pink hearts that can be thrown at enemies to turn them into an ally. Since Kirby's Adventure, the Kirby games have introduced a large variety of Copy Abilities, which grant him numerous powers and costumes, including Sword, in which he obtains a sword and appearance similar to Link, Artist, where his creations come to life, and Needle, where he wears a spiky hat. Kirby and the Forgotten Land further evolved Kirby's skills by allowing the player to upgrade his Copy Abilities multiple times, making them even more powerful, such as his Fire ability, which can be upgraded to Volcano Fire and Dragon Fire. The game's Mouthful Mode mechanic gives Kirby the ability to inhale objects, such as a car, and embody its shape and function.

== Appearances ==
=== Main series ===
Since his debut in 1992, Kirby has been the protagonist of the Kirby series. Most Kirby games are platform games, but his large catalogue also cuts across a variety of genres, including pinball, fighting, racing, block puzzle, and party games. Throughout his adventures, Kirby has been pitted against various enemies, including the primary antagonist of the series, a recurring penguin called King Dedede.

Kirby made his debut in Kirby's Dream Land, which released in 1992 on the Game Boy. It featured the ability to suck in air and fly as one of his signature moves.

Kirby made his debut on the Game Boy in 1992 in Kirby's Dream Land, a 2D side-scrolling platform game that introduced his ability to suck, swallow, and spit out enemies as projectiles alongside other moves such as running, jumping and flying. The obtainable food items in the game act as power-ups and grant him a variety of abilities. Upon reaching the end of a level, Kirby confronts a final boss, such as Whispy Woods or King Dedede. Due to the Game Boy screen's limited colour palette, he appeared in grey rather than his typical pink hue. A year later, Kirby's Adventure on the NES introduced his copy ability and other moves, such as the ability to dash and slide kick, and a recurring rival named Meta Knight. Kirby's appearance was nearly identical to his previous iteration, although he was slightly shorter, his body was rendered in pink and his face was enhanced with dark pink ovals. He again combats King Dedede, but must also defeat an entity named Nightmare, whom he accidentally releases with the Star Rod. In 1995, another platform game was released on the Game Boy titled Kirby's Dream Land 2. Kirby is accompanied by three animal friends who aid him during his adventure named Rick the hamster, Coo the owl, and Kine the fish. His in-game appearance was returned to grey, and he was slightly taller than his NES incarnation, although he is pink in the game's box art. In the extended finale, Kirby battles a boss called Dark Matter, an entity that transforms into a one-eyed black orb. In 1996, Kirby Super Star was released on the Super Nintendo Entertainment System, a compilation of eight mini-games, such as Gourmet Race, where Kirby races against King Dedede in a food collecting competition. It was the first game to introduce helpers controlled by the game or by another player and also gave Kirby various hats to illustrate his various copy abilities. In 1997, Kirby's Dream Land 3, which released on the SNES, introduced new animal friends for Kirby, including Nago the cat and ChuChu the octopus. Kirby again defeats Dark Matter, only to face a monstrous white entity with a single eye named Zero.

Kirby 64: The Crystal Shards, which released on the Nintendo 64 in 2000, introduced 3D computer graphics. Kirby's form became perfectly spherical. His skills were upgraded by combining two of the same abilities to create stronger effects or combining two different abilities to create a new effect. Kirby's earlier enemies Dark Matter and Zero returned as new bosses in the forms of Miracle Matter and Zero Two. (Note: Also written 0²) In 2004, Kirby & the Amazing Mirror released on the Game Boy Advance. It was the first game in the series to feature cooperative multiplayer for four players. Kirby can copy the abilities of enemies to progress into new areas before facing a boss. The game granted Kirby some new abilities, such as Cupid, which gives him the power to fly and shoot arrows with a bow. The 2006 game Kirby: Squeak Squad was another 2D platformer, this time released on the Nintendo DS. Kirby can swallow multiple abilities and combine some of them to create new abilities. By using Ability Scrolls, his equipped skills can be upgraded to make them more powerful. He can also interact with the environment, such as cut grass or melt ice. In the 2011 platform game Kirby's Return to Dream Land on the Wii, Kirby returned to the visuals and gameplay of The Crystal Shards but with four-player multiplay added. He uses his usual copy abilities but gained some new ones, including Super Inhale, which is made more powerful by shaking the Wii Remote.

Kirby: Triple Deluxe, which released on the Nintendo 3DS in 2014, introduced new copy abilities, such as Beetle and Archer. By collecting a Miracle Fruit, Kirby can transform into Hypernova Kirby, which allows him to inhale much larger objects. In 2016, gained new abilities and a mech suit called the Robobot armour in Kirby: Planet Robobot, which released on the 3DS. The Robobot increases Kirby's power and can gain copy abilities like Kirby. In 2018, the Nintendo Switch game Kirby Star Allies incorporated elements from previous games in the series, including Kirby's copy ability, dash, and sliding kick. It was designed for four-player cooperative play, allowing Kirby to beat stages alongside his allies. With the release of the Switch game Kirby and the Forgotten Land in 2022, Kirby transitioned to a fully 3D environment. Alongside new copy abilities like Ranger and Drill, the game introduced Mouthful Mode, in which Kirby expands his mouth to fit around objects to adopt their shape and absorb their abilities.

=== Spin-off games ===
Kirby has appeared in multiple spin-off games. In 1993, he was transformed into a pinball in Kirby's Pinball Land on the Game Boy. The following year, he returned in the form of a golf ball in the SNES game Kirby's Dream Course, which requires the player to hit him around various golf courses. In 1995, Kirby's Avalanche was released for a Western audience by rebranding the Japanese puzzle game Super Puyo Puyo for the Kirby series. Two further Kirby games released that year titled Kirby's Block Ball, a game that is similar to Breakout but features power-ups and boss encounters, and Kirby's Toy Box, a game released exclusively in Japan on the Satellaview that features eight games, including baseball, pinball and pachinko. Kirby appeared in the 1997 Game Boy puzzle game Kirby's Star Stacker, in which stars are sandwiched between matching blocks featuring Kirby's animal friends. In the 2001 Game Boy Color game Kirby Tilt 'n' Tumble, Kirby is rolled around a course in search of stars while avoiding various obstacles. The following year, he appeared in Kirby: Nightmare in Dream Land, an updated version of the NES game. In 2003, he returned to the GameCube in Kirby Air Ride, a racing game that involves steering Kirby around the track and inhaling enemies. Kirby Canvas Curse was his first game on the Nintendo DS and involved the use of the stylus to draw a path for his movement, stun enemies and activate copy abilities. In 2010, Kirby's appearance changed dramatically from a solid object to an outline of yarn in Kirby's Epic Yarn. In 2011, Kirby returned on the DS for Kirby Mass Attack, in which up to ten Kirbys are controlled by tapping the screen. A sequel to Canvas Curse released in 2015 on the Wii U titled Kirby and the Rainbow Curse. It involves controlling Kirby with the stylus on the game pad by painting paths and tapping him to dash. Kirby stars in a 2017 brawler on the 3DS titled Kirby Battle Royale, in which he fights other Kirbys in various arenas. In 2019, Super Kirby Clash released on the Nintendo Switch, which involves up to four players playing as a Kirby to take on several boss battles using various roles. The following year, Kirby Fighters 2 released on the Switch, which is a fighting game involving 17 playable Kirbys that each have a specific copy ability. In 2022, Kirby's Dream Buffet was released on the Switch, where up to four players can compete as Kirby in a race to eat the most strawberries.

=== Super Smash Bros. series and other games ===
Kirby appears in every game in the Super Smash Bros. series, also created by Sakurai, as a playable character. As in the main series, Kirby is able to use copy-based transitions to copy the abilities and appearance of opponents, such as Mario, Donkey Kong, Link, and Samus. In Ultimate, he plays a starring role in the "World of Light" story mode, in which he is the only survivor of Galeem's massacre out of all of the other fighters. Sakurai stated that, after a process of elimination, Kirby was the obvious choice due to his Warp Star providing a reasonable explanation for his escape. In Super Smash Bros. Brawl (2008), Kirby's Final Smash is his Cook ability, which cooks opponents in a pot. In Super Smash Bros. for Nintendo 3DS and Wii U (2014) and Super Smash Bros. Ultimate (2018), Kirby's Final Smash is an Ultra Sword attack.

Kirby has made cameo appearances in several other video games. A pink Kirby character appears in The Legend of Zelda: Link's Awakening. In 1992, he appeared in the opening cutscene of Arcana. He has also made a minor appearance in the Pokémon Stadium series.

=== In other media ===
Kirby appears in his own anime titled Kirby: Right Back at Ya!, (Japanese: 星のカービィ Hoshi no Kābī), which aired from 2001 to 2003 in Japan. The series was licensed in North America by 4Kids Entertainment and aired in the United States from 2002 to 2006, consisting of 100 episodes. The anime is based loosely on the games, but with some differences. Like his game counterpart, anime Kirby is unable to speak in complete sentences but unlike his game counterpart he is more presented like a baby, being more helpless and immature. He is described as a "Star Warrior" and his Copy Ability is powered by his Warp Star. The series begins with him crashing his Starship in Cappy Town on Planet Popstar, where he befriends Tiff and Tuff. In the story, he encounters King Dedede, the greedy, selfish ruler, and Meta Knight, and faces the overarching villain, eNeMeE.

Kirby also stars in several manga adaptations. The longest-running series, Kirby of the Stars: The Story of Dedede Who Lives in Pupupu, was serialized in CoroCoro Comic from 1994 to 2006, which has been compiled into 25 tankōbon volumes, with over 10 million copies being printed. It continued serialization in CoroCoro Aniki in 2017. Viz Media originally planned to release the manga in English in September 2010, but it was pushed back and eventually cancelled. The series was later published as a "best-of" collection, which also features new chapters from its continued serialization, and was published in English as Kirby Manga Mania by Viz Media.

== Promotion and reception ==
Kirby has been widely merchandised across a large variety of products. He has been created in the form of statues and numerous plush toys. Two amiibo of Kirby were released for the Super Smash Bros. series and for the Kirby series in 2014 and 2016. A limited edition Nendoroid of Kirby was produced for the character's 30th anniversary.

Steve Watts of GameSpot felt that Kirby is one of the most versatile Nintendo characters, second only to Mario, due to his large catalogue of experimental games and art styles. The 2011 Guinness World Records Gamer's Edition lists Kirby as the 18th most popular video game character. GamesRadar+ listed Kirby as one of the most lovable blobs, calling him one of the cutest things to appear in a Nintendo game, yet also describing the way he defeats his enemies as "horrific". Marc Normandin writing for Paste opined that Kirby is the most powerful character in all of media, noting that his ability to inhale enemies and steal their powers "makes him effectively unstoppable" and that his evolution proves that he has become more powerful over time. Due to his popularity with gamers, Kirby became the subject of a meme in 2017, which depicted him with realistic legs or feet, thereby transforming him into a grotesque character.

Kirby is a controversial character with competitive Super Smash Bros. players. Maddy Myers of Kotaku commented that in the first Super Smash Bros. game, he was hugely overpowered, being both fast and hard-hitting. His ability to swallow opponents and spit them out over the edge of the platform could be dangerous for competitors, particularly when using a technique known as "Kirbycide", which involves leaping off the edge and pulling the opponent down, killing both, while still achieving a victory. With the release of Super Smash Bros. Melee, Kirby's status amongst players took a nosedive due to his movement speed being drastically reduced. Although this was increased in Super Smash Bros. Brawl, his reputation had already been severely damaged amongst professional players. Ozzie Mejia of Shacknews noted that by Super Smash Bros. Ultimate, Kirby's moveset had improved despite being largely the same as in the previous games. His moves were also much faster and he had the ability to swallow projectiles and fire them back at opponents as a star. Gavin Jasper of Den of Geek ranked Kirby as the best Super Smash Bros. Ultimate character, praising his absorbing ability as one of the best things in the game, in particular his ability to steal opponents' powers but also take on an aspect of their appearance.

Bryan Lufkin of Wired described Kirby as a "true videogame icon", citing his enduring appeal as a cute, child-friendly character. He said that his popularity is not only due to his loveable appearance, but also the simplicity of his gameplay and his ability to be moulded into different situations. He further commented that, despite not being as well known as Mario, Kirby's success makes him a "money-making machine" for Nintendo. Steven T. Wright of GameSpot noted that although Kirby is a beloved Nintendo character, his games have not been huge sellers over the years until the release of Kirby and the Forgotten Land, but opined that his inclusion in the original Super Smash Bros. game had successfully boosted his popularity. To celebrate Kirby's 20th anniversary, 536 of his fans broke a Guinness World Record in September 2012 at Penny Arcade Expo for the most people blowing chewing gum bubbles at the same time. Kirby is incredibly popular in Japan. In 2019, Nintendo Life reported that he was consistently voted the most popular Nintendo character by readers of Japan's Nintendo Dream. Due to his popularity, Nintendo and HAL Laboratory have operated a chain of Kirby-themed restaurants named Kirby Café, which began operating in 2016 with temporary pop up restaurants opening in Osaka, Tokyo and Nagoya. Permanent restaurants later opened in the Tokyo Solamachi shopping complex and Hakata, with an Osaka location opening in 2024.

== See also ==
- Characters of the Kirby series
