= Kirby and the Forgotten Land =

2022 video game

- Game icon
- Developer: HAL Laboratory (Note: Additional work by Vanpool)
- Publisher: Nintendo
- Directors: Shinya Kumazaki; Tatsuya Kamiyama
- Producers: Tadashi Kamitake; Toyokazu Nonaka; Akira Kinashi
- Designer: Yuki Endo
- Programmers: Yudai Hirata; Hiroaki Nakano
- Artist: Riki Fuhrmann
- Writer: Shinya Kumazaki
- Composers: Yuuta Ogasawara; Hirokazu Ando; Jun Ishikawa; Yuki Shimooka; Yuki Kato (Note: Star-Crossed World); Megumi Ohara; Shogo Sakai
- Series: Kirby
- Platforms: Nintendo Switch; Nintendo Switch 2
- Release: Nintendo Switch; March 25, 2022; Nintendo Switch 2 August 28, 2025
- Genre: Platform
- Modes: Single-player, multiplayer

Kirby and the Forgotten Land (Note: Japanese: 星のカービィ ディスカバリー, Hepburn: Hoshi no Kābī Disukabarī; lit. "Kirby of the Stars: Discovery") is a 2022 platform game developed by HAL Laboratory and published by Nintendo for the Nintendo Switch. Released on March 25, 2022, is the thirteenth mainline installment in the Kirby series and the second on the Switch, as well as the first non-spinoff game in the series to be in full 3D. The player controls Kirby in an adventure through the titular forgotten land to rescue Waddle Dees kidnapped by the ferocious Beast Pack. To complete each stage and save the Waddle Dees, Kirby can use a wide range of copy abilities to help battle enemies and progress the level.

Kirby and the Forgotten Land was well received by critics, who praised its graphics, level design, gameplay, soundtrack, and amount of content, with some calling it among the best games in the series. Minor criticism was directed towards the limited movement options and controls and repetitive mini-bosses. The game was a commercial success, selling over 7.52 million copies by March 2024, making it the best-selling game in the series and one of the best-selling games on the Switch.

A Nintendo Switch 2 Edition of Kirby and the Forgotten Land, an enhanced version of the game featuring improved performance and a new story campaign titled Star-Crossed World, (Note: Japanese: スターリーワールド, Hepburn: Sutārī Wārudo; lit. "Starry World") was released for the Nintendo Switch 2 on August 28, 2025. The next 3D game in the series, Kirby and the World Beyond, is scheduled for release on the Switch 2 in Spring 2027.

== Gameplay ==
A screenshot of Kirby and the Forgotten Land, featuring Kirby rolling down a hill after ingesting a pipe using the 'Mouthful Mode' system introduced in this game

Kirby and the Forgotten Land is the first platform game in the series with full 3D gameplay, where the player must guide Kirby through various different stages to save the Waddle Dees at the end. As in most Kirby games, Kirby can jump and slide as well as inhale enemies and objects which he can either spit out as projectiles or swallow to gain a copy ability. Alongside returning copy abilities, this game introduced Drill and Ranger as two new copy abilities, as well as a new "Mouthful Mode" system where Kirby can swallow and control larger objects, such as cars and vending machines. Similar to Kirby Battle Royale and Kirby and the Rainbow Curse, a second player can join in and play as Bandana Waddle Dee, who uses a spear as his main form of attack.

Copy abilities can be upgraded at Waddle Dee's Weapons Shop in the main hub area of the game, Waddle Dee Town. These upgrades make the Copy Abilities stronger and give them more attacks for Kirby to use. Upgrading abilities requires Rare Stones, which can be obtained by completing special Treasure Road levels found throughout the game. After completing the game, Rare Stones can also be used to power up a Copy Ability, increasing the amount of damage it deals.

The goal of each stage is to rescue the Waddle Dees, who are freed by finding them trapped in cages throughout the stage, as well as by accomplishing certain goals specific to each stage. Once rescued, they return to Waddle Dee Town. As the player rescues more Waddle Dees, the size of the town increases, unlocking new minigames. These include fishing, working a part-time job at Waddle Dee Café, and a puzzle minigame akin to Kirby Tilt 'n' Tumble. The game also supports Amiibo functionality.

== Plot ==
One day, on Kirby's home planet Planet Popstar, a dark vortex appears over Dream Land, sucking up everything in its path. Kirby is among those sucked into the vortex and finds himself in a new world that is filled with the ruins of an ancient civilization. He discovers that the Waddle Dees from Dream Land are being kidnapped by the native wildlife, the Beast Pack. Eventually, he finds the destroyed Waddle Dee Town and a chinchilla-like creature named Elfilin, who helped the Waddle Dees settle there. Upon being rescued from the Beast Pack, Elfilin explains to Kirby that he and the Waddle Dees attempted to fight back but were overwhelmed. Kirby offers to help Elfilin rescue the missing Waddle Dees, and the two set off together.

As Kirby and Elfilin make their way through the new world, rescuing Waddle Dees and defeating the Beast Pack's high council members, the two discover that King Dedede is acting aggressively and assisting the Beast Pack for unknown reasons. After Kirby fights and defeats Dedede, the latter captures Elfilin and escapes; Kirby pursues Dedede and eventually fights him again. By destroying a hypnotic mask that Dedede was wearing, Kirby frees him from the Beast Pack's control. Kirby then rides an elevator into their center of operations, Lab Discovera, to find Elfilin. An abandoned tourist attraction within the lab explains, via pre-recorded narration, that a powerful extraterrestrial under the identification tag ID-F86 once tried to invade the new world. It was captured by the planet's previous inhabitants and placed in the lab, where its ability to create space-time rifts was researched. Thirty years after research began, ID-F86 split into two halves during a "warp-experiment incident". One half, Elfilin, escaped in the chaos, while the other half, known as Fecto Forgo, was placed in permanent suspended animation within Lab Discovera's Eternal Capsule.

Kirby then meets the leader of the Beast Pack, a lion named Leongar, who is holding Elfilin captive. Leongar explains that the previous inhabitants of the new world used ID-F86's power to depart for "a land of dreams," and that he intends to do the same by reuniting Fecto Forgo with Elfilin. After Leongar is defeated, Fecto Forgo awakens; speaking through Leongar, it reveals that it had formed the Beast Pack by possessing Leongar, controlling his actions by proxy. It also opened the vortex to Dream Land, used the Beast Pack to hypnotize King Dedede and kidnapped the Waddle Dees for labor, in order to resume its invasion. It then breaks free from the Eternal Capsule and consumes Leongar and the Beast Pack to pursue Elfilin; when it ultimately captures Elfilin, the two recombine into their original form, Fecto Elfilis. Kirby manages to weaken Fecto Elfilis enough to free Elfilin, but Fecto Elfilis creates a large vortex back to Popstar with its remaining energy, setting it on a collision course with the new world to destroy both. Kirby and Elfilin narrowly defeat Fecto Elfilis by ramming a semi-trailer truck into them with their combined powers, destroying it, and he and Elfilin then find themselves back in Dream Land, where the vortex is still open. Realizing the danger is imminent, Elfilin seals the vortex between the two worlds using all of his power, seemingly leaving Kirby behind. In the credits, it is revealed that Elfilin is able to open his own vortex to Popstar, and the inhabitants of the two worlds become friends.

However, Leongar's soul and body remain trapped in an alternate dimension called Forgo Dreams, created by Fecto Forgo's psychic power and populated by phantoms generated by their memories of the Beast Pack. Clawroline, a member of the Beast Pack and friend of Leongar, discovers a rift in Waddle Dee Town that leads to Forgo Dreams and asks for Elfilin and Kirby's help to rescue him. Upon being sucked into this dimension, Kirby and Elfilin rescue Leongar, who ends up possessed by Fecto Forgo's soul. Kirby defeats the possessed Leongar, separating the soul of Fecto Forgo from his body. Before it can attack Kirby, a scarlet butterfly flies into the lab, absorbs Fecto Forgo, and transforms into Morpho Knight, a valkyrie-like warrior who feasts on souls to absorb their power. Kirby defeats Morpho Knight and Leongar is properly freed thanks to the Beast Pack piecing Leongar's soul back together, and Kirby and Elfilin befriend him. However, Fecto Forgo partially absorbs Morpho Knight's power and vanishes in the aftermath.

Following this, a mysterious portal opens within Waddle Dee Town's colosseum. In an optional final encounter, Kirby combats the phantoms of Forgo Dreams in a boss rush before confronting Chaos Elfilis, newly formed from Fecto Forgo's absorption of Morpho Knight's power. Kirby defeats Chaos Elfilis in a final battle, and a lingering remnant of their soul approaches Elfilin. He accepts it into his heart, allowing his two halves to finally become whole.

=== Star-Crossed World ===
While adventuring the new world, a meteor appears and has several fragments split off of it while its main body crashes into the ocean and forms a volcanic island. Investigating, Kirby meets Astronomer Waddle Dee, who explains that the meteor, the Star of Darkness, contains an evil entity that was sealed away. Kirby ventures across the new world to gather the Stars of Light, spirit-like creatures known as Starries, to reform the seal. Meanwhile, the meteor's fragments causes crystalline formations throughout the new world, while also empowering the Beast Pack.

Upon gathering the Starries, the Star of Darkness immediately breaks free and absorbs the Starries, revealing Fecto Eilfilis' older brother, Genwel Meteonelfilis. Kirby defeats the creature in combat, freeing the Starries and allowing them to reseal it and leave with the restored Star of Darkness.

== Development ==
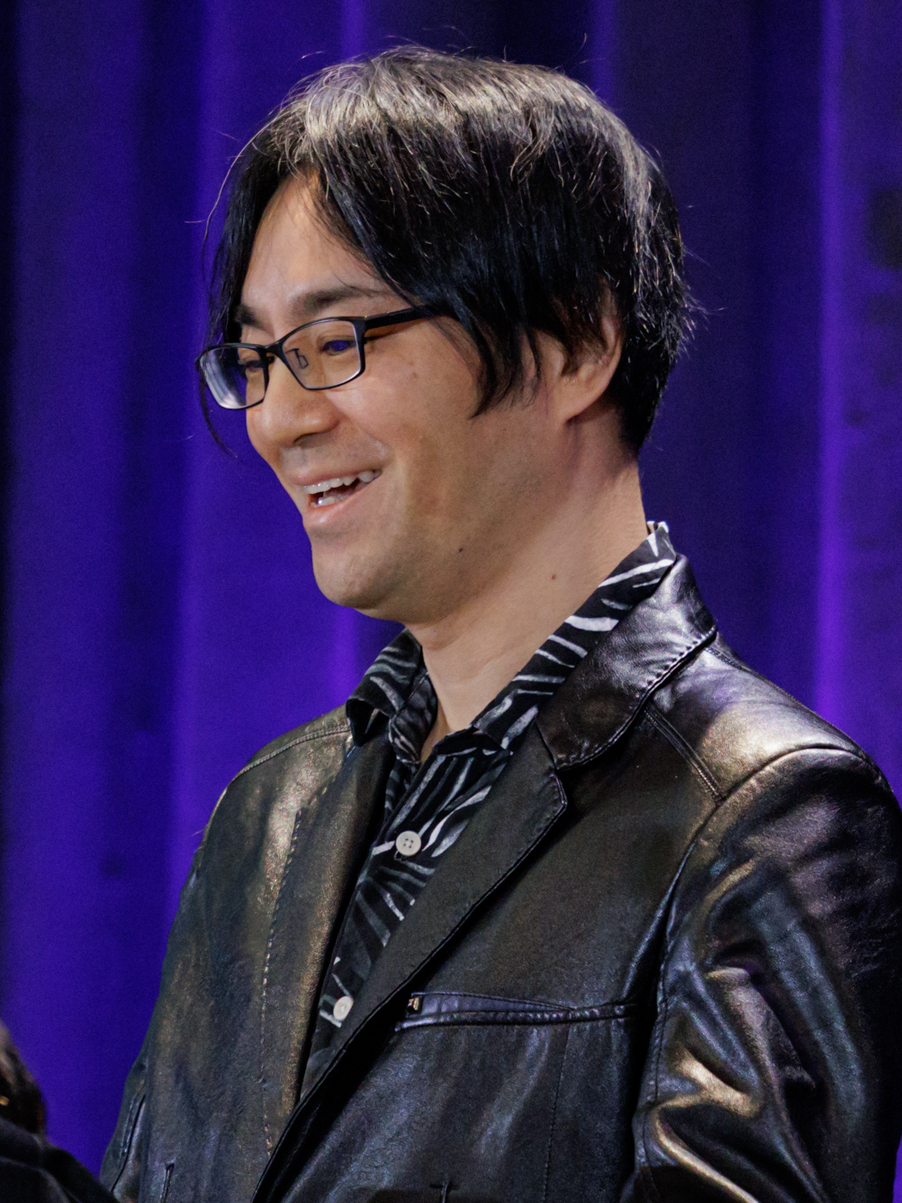
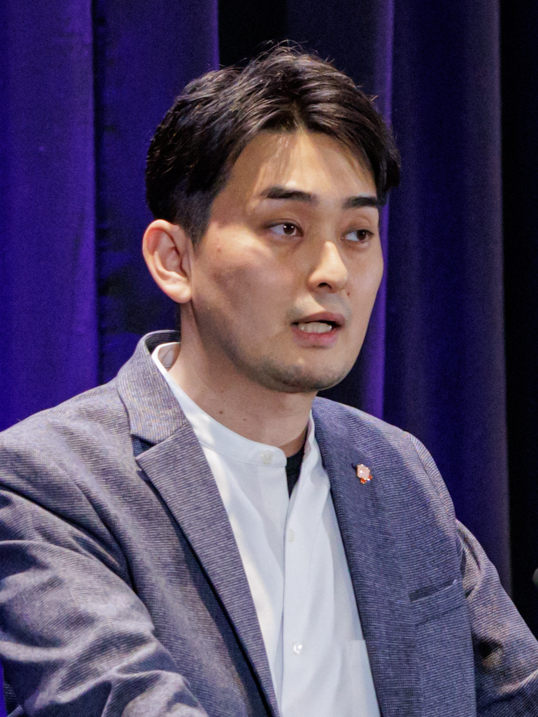
Directors Shinya Kumazaki (L) and Tatsuya Kamiyama (R) speaking at the 2023 Game Developers Conference

HAL Laboratory began teasing a new Kirby game in 2020. General director Shinya Kumazaki described it as the "new phase" for the series and that it will "culminate the best aspects of Kirby". Game director Tatsuya Kamiyama explained how the team focused on making the game approachable even with change of perspective to 3D, while at the same time making it satisfying to play to the player. The 3D transition was described as very challenging, as HAL Laboratory struggled with several failed attempts to bring the Kirby series into 3D, extending back to the 2000s — during early development of what became Kirby's Return to Dream Land. Kamiyama ultimately created a detailed pitch for a 3D Kirby game that presented solutions to the issues that HAL Laboratory had faced, including character design, gameplay and many other aspects, finally allowing for development to begin on a 3D title. Vanpool assisted in development of the game.

Early on, play testers at Nintendo felt that the wide 3D environments made gameplay too easy as players could simply step away from enemy attacks. They suggested that enemy density be increased, but HAL Laboratory declined, saying they did not want to "torment" Kirby or prevent players from peacefully exploring the game world. To mitigate issues with depth perception, the hit detection was altered so that an attack from Kirby will hit an enemy if it looks to have done so from the player's perspective, even if the attack did not actually connect.

A month before the September 2021 Nintendo Direct, the official Kirby website updated with placeholder text, further implying there was a new game coming soon. The game was first officially revealed in the Nintendo Direct on September 23, 2021, having been prematurely shown off on the Nintendo website six hours beforehand. A second, more in-depth trailer was shown on January 12, 2022, which announced more features of the game as well as the release date of March 25, 2022. A free-to-play demo was made available on March 3, 2022.

In April 2025, an enhanced version of the game, Kirby and the Forgotten Land - Nintendo Switch 2 Edition + Star-Crossed World, was announced for the Nintendo Switch 2. The Nintendo Switch 2 Edition features improved performance in addition to the titular Star-Crossed World, an additional story campaign.

== Reception ==
Kirby and the Forgotten Land
(- Nintendo Switch 2 Edition + Star-Crossed World)

Aggregate scores
Aggregator	Score	
Aggregator	NS	NS2
Metacritic	85/100	83/100
OpenCritic	95% recommended	90% recommended

Review scores
Publication	Score	
Publication	NS	NS2
4Players		8/10
Destructoid	9.5/10	9.5/10
Electronic Gaming Monthly	8/10	
Eurogamer	Recommended	
Famitsu	36/40	
Game Informer	9/10	
GameRevolution	9/10	
GameSpot	9/10	8/10
GamesRadar+	4.5/5	
GameStar		85/100
HobbyConsolas		85/100
IGN	8/10	7/10
Jeuxvideo.com		17/20
Nintendo Life	9/10	9/10
Nintendo World Report	9/10	
PC Games (DE)		9/10
Shacknews	9/10	
TechRadar		4.5/5
The Telegraph	3/5	
The Guardian	4/5	
Video Games Chronicle		4/5
VG247	4/5	

Kirby and the Forgotten Land received "generally favorable" reviews, according to review aggregator website Metacritic. Critics hailed it as one of the best Kirby games ever made. (Note: Attributed to multiple sources:)

Several reviewers gave high praise to the exploration-based level design, citing the optional challenges, collectibles, and Treasure Road as elements that gave each level a substantial feel. The upgradable copy abilities and Mouthful Mode were also heavily praised for the gameplay variety they provided while remaining a part of the game's core design, making the combat and platforming consistently interesting as a result. Boss fights were also lauded for requiring the utilization of copy abilities, with several praising the increased difficulty of Forgotten Land in comparison to previous entries in the franchise. The game's visuals and level themes were similarly commended, with the post-apocalyptic aesthetic of the game being cited as creative. Local co-op was praised for being fun and seamless while accommodating younger players. The Waddle Dee Town hub was praised for encouraging player exploration and was deemed a substantially rewarding experience. (Note: Attributed to multiple sources:)

Car-Mouth Kirby, often referred to by the unofficial name Carby, has been well-received by fans. Shortly after it was revealed, Car-Mouth Kirby was added to Mario Kart 8 Deluxe via an unofficial mod.

Minor criticism was directed towards the movement of Kirby for feeling limited and "sluggish", grounded environments, and the recurring mini-bosses that some found stale.

Retrospectively, Heather Wald of GamesRadar+ ranked Kirby and the Forgotten Land first in the publication's list of "The 10 best Kirby games to adventure through".

=== Sales ===
Kirby and the Forgotten Land launched at #1 in the UK, becoming both the series' first chart-topping debut and fourth best-selling Kirby game in the region. The game also launched at #1 in Japan with the series' best physical debut, at 380,060 copies sold in two days. The game sold 2.1 million units in two weeks. It became the 14th best-selling game of 2022 in the US.

As of March 31, 2024, Kirby and the Forgotten Land has sold 7.52 million copies worldwide, making it the best-selling game in the franchise.

=== Awards ===
Kirby and the Forgotten Land was one of ten games to receive an Excellence Award at Japan Game Awards 2022, and was also nominated for Nintendo Game of the Year at the Golden Joystick Awards. It won Best Family Game at The Game Awards 2022.

Year	Award	Category	Result	Ref.
2022	Japan Game Awards 2022	Award for Excellence	Won	
2022	Golden Joystick Awards	Nintendo Game of the Year	Nominated	
2022	The Game Awards 2022	Best Family Game	Won	
2023	New York Game Awards	Central Park Children’s Zoo Award for Best Kids Game	Won	
2023	19th British Academy Games Awards	Family Game	Won	
2023	CEDEC Awards	Engineering Award	Won	
