= Shinya Kumazaki =

Japanese video game director

- 熊崎 信也
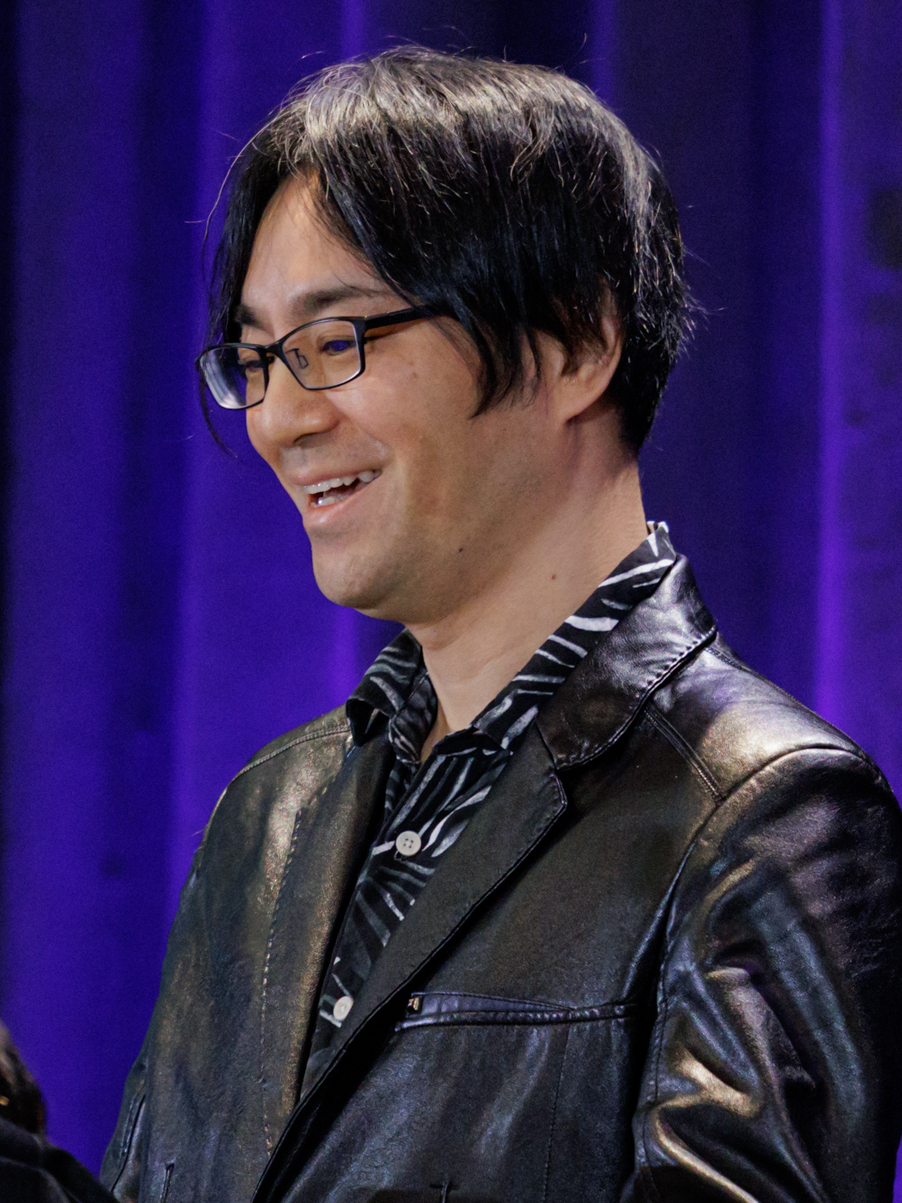
- Kumazaki in 2023
- Born: May 21, 1979 (age 47); Gifu Prefecture, Japan
- Education: Kanazawa College of Art
- Occupations: Game director; game designer
- Employer: HAL Laboratory (2002–present)
- Works: Kirby series BoxBoy! series
- Title: Director of the Board

Shinya Kumazaki (熊崎 信也, Kumazaki Shin'ya; born May 21, 1979) is a Japanese video game director, game designer, HAL Laboratory employee, and painter who is the current general director of the Kirby series and voice of King Dedede.

== Biography ==
=== Early life ===
Born in the Gifu Prefecture in 1979, Kumazaki studied at the Kanazawa College of Art and the Suidobata Fine Arts Academy.

=== Early work at HAL Laboratory ===
Kumazaki first joined HAL Laboratory in 2002, where some of his early roles included debugging the game Kirby: Nightmare in Dream Land and artist for Kirby Air Ride (for the levels) and Kirby Canvas Curse (for the battle with the final boss Drawcia). His first game as director came in 2008 as the Nintendo DS remake Kirby Super Star Ultra where the original game was further expanded to include four additional sub-games.

=== As director ===
In 2010, he was working on the built-in software for the then-new Nintendo 3DS system when he was roped into the development team of the then unfinished Kirby Wii game; under his supervision the development team eventually managed to incorporate elements from the three unfinished concepts for the project and the game was finally released as Kirby's Return to Dream Land.

Since then, Kumazaki has helmed the role of Director and later, General Director for various main Kirby platformers, including Kirby's Dream Collection 20th anniversary compilation (2012), Kirby: Triple Deluxe (2014), Kirby: Planet Robobot (2016), Kirby Star Allies (2018), Kirby and the Forgotten Land (2022), and Kirby's Return to Dream Land Deluxe (2023). In addition, he has worked on the drafts of the box comics of the BoxBoy! series games since 2016 and is the voice actor of King Dedede of the Kirby series, a callback to Masahiro Sakurai’s role as voice actor of King Dedede in Kirby 64: The Crystal Shards.

As general director of the Kirby series games, Kumazaki considers "devices, maps, and tough boss battles" the essential components of quality action games. Kumazaki is also well known within the Kirby fandom for incorporating lore (the most notable being the Ancients first mentioned in Kirby's Return to Dream Land by Magolor) and backstories of various characters and unifying the canon of the series through the pause screen descriptions of various bosses and interviews.

As of 2021, Kumazaki is also in the Board of Directors of HAL Laboratory.

=== Personal life ===
Kumazaki used to own a pet cat by the name of Tom; he sampled the voice of Tom for the voice of the final boss of Kirby: Planet Robobot (2016). The cat died in 2017, aged 17.

Kumazaki also maintains his own personal blog and a public Instagram profile. In his free time Kumazaki creates digital paintings of cosmic horror art, commonly depicting original subjects with occasional renditions of Kirby bosses.

== Ludography ==
Year	Title	Role(s)
2002	Kirby: Nightmare in Dream Land	Communication debugging
2003	Kirby Air Ride	Artist
2005	Kirby Canvas Curse	Artist
2008	Kirby Super Star Ultra	Director
2011	Kirby's Return to Dream Land	Director, voice actor (King Dedede)
2012	Kirby's Dream Collection	Co-director
2014	Kirby: Triple Deluxe	Director, voice actor (King Dedede, Shadow Dedede)
2014	Kirby Fighters Deluxe	Director, voice actor (King Dedede, Shadow Dedede)
2014	Dedede's Drum Dash Deluxe	Director, voice actor (King Dedede, Shadow Dedede)
2016	BoxBoxBoy!	Box comics - drafts
2016	Kirby: Planet Robobot	General director, voice actor (Dedede Clones)
2017	Bye-Bye BoxBoy!	Box comics - drafts
2017	Team Kirby Clash Deluxe	General director, voice actor (King D-Mind)
2017	Kirby's Blowout Blast	General director, voice actor (King Dedede)
2017	Kirby Battle Royale	General director, voice actor (King Dedede)
2018	Kirby Star Allies	General director, voice actor (King Dedede, Void Termina)
2019	Kirby's Extra Epic Yarn	Character supervisor
2019	BoxBoy! + BoxGirl!	Box comics - drafts
2019	Super Kirby Clash	General director, voice actor (King D-Mind), ending song lyrics
2020	Kirby Fighters 2	General director, voice actor (King Dedede)
2022	Kirby and the Forgotten Land	General director, voice actor (King Dedede), theme song lyrics
2022	Kirby's Dream Buffet	General director
2023	Kirby's Return to Dream Land Deluxe	General director, voice actor (King Dedede)
2025	Kirby and the Forgotten Land + Star-Crossed World	General director, voice actor (King Dedede), theme song lyrics
2025	Kirby Air Riders	Supervisor

== See also ==
- Masahiro Sakurai - the creator of the Kirby series
- Kirby series
