= Kirby's Star Stacker =

1997 video game

- North American cover art
- Developer: HAL Laboratory
- Publisher: Nintendo
- Director: Hitoshi Yamagami
- Producer: Hiroaki Suga
- Composers: Hirokazu Ando (GB, SNES); Jun Ishikawa (SNES)
- Series: Kirby
- Platforms: Game Boy, Super Famicom
- Release: Game Boy: JP: January 25, 1997; NA: July 14, 1997; EU: October 25, 1997; Super Famicom: JP: February 1, 1998
- Genre: Puzzle
- Modes: Single-player, multiplayer

Kirby's Star Stacker (Note: Known in Japan as Kirby's Sparkling Kids (カービィのきらきらきっず, Kābī no Kirakira Kizzu)) is a 1997 puzzle video game developed by HAL Laboratory and published by Nintendo for the Game Boy. It is a spin-off of the Kirby series with tile-matching gameplay. It was released for the Nintendo Classics service for the Nintendo Switch in May 2025.

It received a remake for the Super Famicom in Japan.

== Gameplay ==
Kirby's Star Stacker is similar in many respects to other falling block puzzle video games that were around at the time of its release, most notably Soldam. The goal of the game is to earn as many stars possible by matching pairs of blocks (also referred to as friends in-game) that fall from the top of the play area. There are three types of blocks, all based on Kirby's friends from Kirby's Dream Land 2: Rick the hamster, Coo the owl, and Kine the fish. Stars are scored by sandwiching the stars between two matching blocks. When stars are scored, they disappear from the play area along with the pair of blocks enclosing them. The game is lost when the falling blocks reach the top of the play area (middle rows only), so it is critical to eliminate as many blocks as possible by scoring stars.

There are four game modes in Star Stacker.

- Round Clear - this is the main game, split into five difficulty modes (Normal, Hard, Very Hard, Super Hard, and Insane), each with a certain number of rounds. Rounds are cleared by eliminating a set number of stars. Each stage takes on a theme, such as a forest or outer space. When each round is cleared, the player is rewarded with special artwork using the themes of each stage.
- VS - the multiplayer mode, which requires two cartridges of the game, one for each player.
- Challenge - an endless mode. The object is to eliminate as many stars as possible before the stack of blocks reaches the top of the screen; a hand raises up the set of blocks, introducing a new row. Like Round Clear, in-game artwork is awarded depending on the number of stars collected, often encouraging the player to try harder next time (until the final picture is received).
- Time Attack - eliminate as many stars as possible in three minutes.

There is a high score table for the Challenge and Time Attack modes, showing the top three scores for each mode.

== Release and reception ==
Reception

Review score
Publication	Score
Famitsu	7/10, 5/10, 6/10, 6/10

Kirby's Star Stacker was released for the Game Boy in Japan on January 24, 1997.

== Kirby no Kirakira Kids ==
Kirby no Kirakira Kids (カービィのきらきら きっず - Kirby's Sparkling Kids), also commonly referred to as Kirby's Super Star Stacker, is a video game released in 1998 for the Super Famicom; ROMs for the game were distributed via the Nintendo Power flash RAM service, before the game was given a standard cartridge release a year later on June 25, 1999. Kirby no Kirakira Kids is an SNES remake of Kirby's Star Stacker with nearly identical gameplay. The point of the game is to remove falling star blocks by placing matching animal friends (Rick, Coo, and Kine) at either end. One of the primary enhancements is story mode, in which Kirby faces several opponents from other Kirby games (mostly from Kirby Super Star). The game's title is exactly the same as the Japanese title of the Game Boy version of Kirby's Star Stacker. There were plans to release the game overseas, but they were halted after Nintendo of America stopped shipping SNES games in 1997, leaving the game Japan-exclusive.

This version was released on the Wii Virtual Console in Japan on January 5, 2010, on the Nintendo Classics service on July 21, 2022, in Japan, and on September 6, 2023, for the first time in the West under the Game Boy game's western title.
