= Kirby's Dream Land 3 =

1997 video game

- North American box art
- Developer: HAL Laboratory
- Publisher: Nintendo
- Director: Shinichi Shimomura
- Producers: Satoru Iwata; Hiroaki Suga
- Programmer: Teruyuki Gunji
- Artist: Tetsuya Notoya
- Composer: Jun Ishikawa
- Series: Kirby
- Platform: Super Nintendo Entertainment System
- Release: NA: November 17, 1997; JP: March 27, 1998
- Genre: Platform
- Modes: Single-player, multiplayer

Kirby's Dream Land 3 (Note: Known in Japan as Hoshi no Kirby 3 (星のカービィ3, Hoshi no Kābī Surī; lit. Kirby of the Stars 3)) is a 1997 platform game developed by HAL Laboratory and published by Nintendo for the Super Nintendo Entertainment System. Starring Kirby, it is the fifth installment in the Kirby series and the third game under the Kirby's Dream Land name. Although the first game was largely unrelated, Dream Land 3 features many similar characters to Dream Land 2. Dream Land 3 was followed by Kirby 64: The Crystal Shards in 2000.

Kirby's Dream Land 3 was the last SNES game published by Nintendo in North America. Problems with the game's PAL conversion prevented it from being released in Europe and Australia for many years; it was eventually released for the Virtual Console in those regions in the form of an import from North America on July 24, 2009, for the Wii and on July 25, 2013, for the Wii U. The game was re-released on the Virtual Console in North America on January 5, 2009, for the Wii and on May 8, 2013, for the Wii U and in Japan on April 28, 2009, for the Wii and on May 8, 2013, for the Wii U. It was also included as part of the 2012 Wii compilation Kirby's Dream Collection and the Nintendo Classics service.

== Plot ==
On a peaceful day on Planet Popstar, Kirby is enjoying fishing with his friend Gooey. Suddenly, a mysterious dark cloud begins to loom over the sky, breaking Popstar's rings in the process and reaching over the distant corners of the world. Coo quickly tells Kirby that Popstar is in trouble, and they soon set off to protect the world once again.

Two endings exist for the game, based on whether the player has collected all the Heart Stars. If the player has not collected all the stars, Kirby and his friends fight King Dedede, who is possessed by Dark Matter. Once Dedede is defeated once, Dark Matter begins to reveal himself, and Kirby must fight Dedede for a second consecutive time. After Dark Matter is defeated, Kirby and Gooey set off on the journey home, only to pause hesitantly at several points along the way. At the end of the credits, the camera pans up to focus on a huge, shadowed orb with one massive red eye. This mysterious figure is Zero, the ultimate leader of the Dark Matter Army. If the player has collected all the stars, the player proceeds to fight Dedede as normal. However, Dark Matter then emerges and flies into the atmosphere, with Kirby in hot pursuit, armed with a weapon called the Love-Love Stick, assembled from all the Heart Stars he collected during his journey. After a climactic battle with Dark Matter, Zero himself emerges, leading to a long and difficult battle. After Zero is defeated, peace is finally restored to the universe.

== Gameplay ==
Screenshot of Kirby being carried by animal friend Nago shortly after using his "cutter"-ability to shoot an energy beam to destroy some ability-specific blocks

Kirby's Dream Land 3 is a traditional platformer Kirby game; the player controls Kirby, whose objective is to get to the end of each stage. Kirby is able to walk, swim, and fly throughout a variety of levels, using several of his Animal Friends and Copy Abilities to avoid and defeat obstacles and enemies that lie in his path. Kirby's moveset includes the inhale, Star Spit, Air Gun, and floating. Using inhale, Kirby can absorb a number of enemies, often gaining their abilities in turn. These abilities can be used as weapons then. Additionally, some parts of the game world require a certain ability to be accessed, such as blocks that can only be destroyed by the ability displayed on them.

Zero is the game's secret and true final boss; defeating him is key in achieving the best ending. He can be encountered by grabbing all the heart stars on each level. Zero takes the form of a giant eye with a red iris, and is responsible for leading the Dark Matter invasion of Dreamland. Zero is famous for being a rare example of graphic violence in a first-party Nintendo game – Zero fights Kirby by opening cuts on his sclera and shooting blood out of the cuts at him, as well as summoning small Dark Matters to use as projectiles. When his health is drastically weakened, his iris would rip out from the rest of his body, with blood flying everywhere as it does so. The ruined body, complete with a vicious gash to its front from where the eye burst out trails away, and the final phase of the fight begins, which involves Zero ramming Kirby to injure him. Although he is eventually defeated, Zero reappears in Kirby 64: The Crystal Shards as '0^{2}' (pronounced zero two), still retaining his ability to spit blood and his motif as a giant eye. As a reference to his previous fight with Kirby, 0^{2} wears two large plasters on the top of his 'head', covering the wound left from his iris bursting out of his body.

=== Kirby's allies ===
At any time during play, Kirby can summon Gooey—a blue, long-tongued blob first seen in Dream Land 2. Doing so costs Kirby two hit points. When controlled by the computer or also a second human player, Gooey's abilities are similar to Kirby's: he can swallow enemies using his long tongue, then either spit them out or copy their abilities to a limited extent. Gooey's tongue is also capable of obtaining items similar to Kirby's inhale, though it is also capable of grabbing stars, which Kirby would need to touch in order to obtain. Kirby can also inhale Gooey and swallow him, reclaiming his two hit points.

In addition to Gooey, Kirby can team up with anyone of his six other Animal Friends, three of which were introduced in the previous game in the series. This friend mechanic allows Kirby to be ridden, carried, or rolled, enabling new team-based abilities, as well as variations of Kirby's copy abilities. The friends Kirby can team up with are:

- Rick the Hamster, who can only jump once but can stomp on enemies, run faster, doesn't slide on ice and can scale walls.
- Coo the Owl, who can fly quickly (even against strong gusts of wind) and can let Kirby inhale in mid-air.
- Kine the Ocean sunfish, who can only jump once but can stomp on enemies, swim more efficiently in water (even against strong currents), and can let Kirby inhale underwater.
- Nago the Calico cat, who can stomp on enemies and triple-jump.
- Pitch the Songbird, who has more versatile copy ability variants than the other Animal Friends, but cannot fly against strong winds like Coo can and is much more limited in flying due to his small size, only being able to fly like how Kirby can float.
- ChuChu the Octopus, who can only float for a limited time before gradually descending, but is able to cling to and walk across ceilings and can grab items with her tentacles (identically to Gooey's tongue; in both cases, this function is only usable without ability as it replaces Kirby's inhale ability, and, unlike said inhale ability, can be used underwater).

Numerous puzzles in the game make use of the Animal Friends' different gameplay styles, and usually require the player to master them in order to be completed. For example, one mission that has Kirby escort Rick to the end of the level features numerous high walls to scale and large gaps bridged by enemies to stomp on, and another mission makes Kirby use the Clean ability with Pitch to water some flowers. In many other cases, however, the Animal Friends serve as a supplement to the gameplay with the purpose of aiding the player. Additionally, each world features one Heart Star mission requiring that Kirby escort an Animal Friend to an acquaintance of theirs at the end of the level.

== Development ==
Kirby's Dream Land 3 uses a mode of the SNES termed "pseudo high-resolution" (which allows for color blending between two adjacent pixels) to blend dithered sprites.

The cartridge includes an SA-1 coprocessor chip.

== Reception ==
Reception

Aggregate score
Aggregator	Score
GameRankings	66%

Review scores
Publication	Score
IGN	7/10
Nintendo Life	6/10
Nintendo Power	6.5/10
Nintendo World Report	9/10

Kirby's Dream Land 3 received mixed reception from both critics and fans. GameRankings gave the SNES version an aggregated score of 66.25% based on four reviews. IGN gave Dream Land 3 a fairly positive review of the Virtual Console re-release, "It's not Super Star. But once you get past that, you can appreciate Dream Land 3 for what it is -- a direct, numbered follow-up to the series that started on the Game Boy." Nintendo Life initially gave the game a 6 out of 10, criticizing the lack of difficulty but praising the stylized graphics. However, a different reviewer for the same website gave the Virtual Console re-release a 7 out of 10, calling Dream Land 3 a "lovable gaming experience" and a "worthy sequel." Nintendo World Report gave the game a 9 out of 10, praising its graphics and music. IGN ranked the game 62nd on their "Top 100 SNES Games of All Time."
