= Kirby's Block Ball =

1995 video game

- North American box art
- Developers: Tose; Nintendo R&D1
- Publisher: Nintendo
- Director: Hiromune Kouno
- Producers: Gunpei Yokoi; Shigeru Miyamoto
- Designers: Hiroyoshi Kubo; Ichirou Takigawa
- Programmers: Takeshi Yamazaki; Toshifumi Hiroo; Yuki Yano; Yasu Shimokawa; Zhu Li
- Artists: Isao Shiroyama; You Kotou
- Composers: Sukezo Ouyama; Ryoue Takagi
- Series: Kirby
- Platform: Game Boy
- Release: JP: December 14, 1995; EU: 1995; NA: May 1996
- Genre: Action
- Mode: Single-player

Kirby’s Block Ball, known in Japan as Kirby no Block Ball (Note: Japanese: カービィのブロックボール, Hepburn: Kābī no Burokku Bōru), is a 1995 action video game developed by Tose and Nintendo and published by Nintendo for the Game Boy. It is a spin-off of the Kirby video game series. It is a Breakout clone; the player controls paddles along the screen's edge to knock a bouncing ball, Kirby, into destructible bricks. The game's 55 levels include power-ups, bonus rounds, and minigames. The team spent half a year revising the gameplay to match Kirby's signature characteristics. Kirby's Block Ball was released in Japan on December 14, 1995, later in North America in May 1996, and in Europe on August 29, 1996.

Reviewers considered the game an improvement on the Breakout formula and praised its gameplay craftsmanship and incorporation of the Kirby series. It was included in multiple top Game Boy game lists and was later released on the Nintendo 3DS Virtual Console.

== Gameplay ==
Screenshot of gameplay as Kirby uses the "spark" power-up and three walls are exposed

The player controls paddles along the screen's edges to knock a bouncing ball, Kirby, into destructible bricks. The player loses a life if Kirby hits a spike-covered edge of the screen. Each of the game's eleven stages include five rounds of increasingly complex block patterns for Kirby to clear. The ten different block types vary in durability and points value. A well-timed hit of the paddle gives Kirby a powerful bounce to break through harder blocks. Another block type turns the remaining blocks into a bonus round that rewards the player for clearing the screen in the least amount of time. The player can find warp stars that lead to minigames, such as air hockey, where the player can earn extra lives. The rounds also include enemies to attack and avoid. Some enemies contain bonus items. Each stage ends in a boss fight.

With the stone, needle, flame, and spark Copy Abilities, Kirby can transform to interact with blocks differently. For instance, the spark power-up lets Kirby break through otherwise indestructible blocks, and the needle allows Kirby to stick back to a paddle to launch again from a more advantageous position. The game has a themed frame and uses a wide palette of colors in-game when played with the Super Game Boy.

== Development ==
The game was developed by Nintendo R&D1, and published by Nintendo. At one point in development, HAL decided that the game did not feel like a Kirby game. The team spent six months completely revising the game under explicit instructions on how Kirby should move. Kirby games contain elements of unrestricted, creative movement as a general theme. Kirby's Block Ball was released for the Game Boy first in Japan on December 14, 1995 and later in Europe (1995) and North America (May 1996). It was later released on the Nintendo 3DS Virtual Console, and released first in Japan (October 2011) and later in Europe (February 2012) and North America (May 2012).

== Reception and legacy ==
Reception

Review scores
Publication	Score
Electronic Gaming Monthly	8/10, 8.5/10, 7.5/10, 7.5/10
Famitsu	6/10, 6/10, 6/10, 7/10
Jeuxvideo.com	16/20
Planet Game Boy	5/5

On release, the four reviewers of Electronic Gaming Monthly applauded Kirby's Block Ball for modifying the Breakout formula to create a new and enjoyable game. They especially praised the unique power-ups, though Crispin Boyer and Sushi X also felt the game was too short and easy. It was later a runner up for their Hand-Held Game of the Year (behind Tetris Attack). Nintendo Power said they enjoyed Block Ball and its number of stages, but wondered how its eight megabits of memory were being used. The magazine found the parts where Kirby eats the unbreakable blocks to be innovative. All six of the magazine's reviewers recommended the game.

IGN wrote that the game was primarily remembered as "an Arkanoid or Breakout clone skinned with the Kirby franchise". IGN calculated an average reviewer score of 7.4/10. The Kirby series became known for its number of non-platformer spin-offs, of which Block Ball was one, like Kirby's Pinball Land and Kirby's Dream Course. Kirby's spherical shape lent itself towards ball-like roles. IGN wrote that Block Ball was the first "truly out there" Kirby spin-off, but that the game was too short.

Planet Game Boy called it one of the original Game Boy's ten "all-time classics" and GamesRadar placed it among the top 25 Game Boy games released. They considered Kirby's Block Ball an improvement upon Alleyway, a Game Boy launch title and Breakout clone. IGN recommended the game upon its 3DS rerelease both in general and for Breakout fans. Nintendo World Report recommended the game to players who like score attack games and called it the best version of Breakout released. Retrospective reviewers found the game enjoyable and praised the craft behind the gameplay and Kirby themes. Alternatively, Kirby's Block Ball received the lowest rating on Tim Rogers's 2004 "Yamanote Scoring System for Portable Games" (a metric by which he played a game while counting stops on the circular Yamanote train line until he lost interest) with a score of "one" stop. He called it "too damned bland".

In a retrospective review, Jeuxvideo.com had high praise for the level design, graphics, and animations. They also found the music excellent in comparison to the annoying and repetitive soundtrack of most Breakout clones. The magazine also liked how the game fit the Kirby universe, apart from its increased difficulty—Jeuxvideo.com occasionally had trouble hitting the slow-paced ball with precision.

== See also ==
- List of Kirby media
- 1995 in video games
