= Kirby's Dream Collection =

2012 video game compilation

Kirby's Dream Collection Special Edition
- North American box art
- Developer: HAL Laboratory
- Publisher: Nintendo
- Directors: Shinya Kumazaki; Tatsuya Kamiyama
- Producers: Yoichi Yamamoto; Hiroaki Suga; Kensuke Tanabe
- Composers: Jun Ishikawa; Hirokazu Ando; Shogo Sakai
- Series: Kirby
- Platform: Wii
- Release: JP: July 19, 2012; NA: September 16, 2012
- Genre: Platform
- Modes: Single-player, multiplayer

Kirby's Dream Collection Special Edition (Note: Known in Japan as Hoshi no Kirby 20-shūnen Special Collection (星のカービィ 20周年スペシャルコレクション, Hoshi no Kābi Ni-ju-shūnen Supesharu Korekushon; lit. Kirby of the Stars 20th Anniversary Special Collection)) is a 2012 video game compilation developed by HAL Laboratory and published by Nintendo for the Wii. It is an anthology disc celebrating the 20th anniversary of the Kirby series, and includes six playable Kirby platform games originally released between 1992 and 2000, as well as additional special features. Along with the disc, the package also contains a soundtrack CD and a collectable booklet.

The compilation was released in Japan on July 19, 2012, and in North America on September 16, 2012. To promote its release, Nintendo organized the breaking of a Guinness World Record for the most people blowing a chewing gum bubble simultaneously. Kirby's Dream Collection was positively received, with praise for its content and as a celebration of Kirby. Critics compared the title to the Wii re-release of Super Mario All-Stars (1993), describing Kirby's Dream Collection as a better anniversary compilation.

== Overview ==
Kirby's Dream Collection includes six playable Kirby platform games: the Game Boy games Kirby's Dream Land (1992) and Kirby's Dream Land 2 (1995), the NES game Kirby's Adventure (1993), the SNES games Kirby Super Star (1996) and Kirby's Dream Land 3 (1997), and the Nintendo 64 game Kirby 64: The Crystal Shards (2000). All six games see the player controlling Kirby as he traverses through 2D levels and inhales enemies to defeat them, with later entries introducing the ability to absorb enemies' Copy Abilities and take on their powers. In addition to the GameCube Controller and Classic Controller, all six games have been calibrated for use with the Wii Remote turned horizontally. The game supports up to four players depending on which game is chosen. Like the other four games in the collection, the Game Boy games (Kirby's Dream Land and Kirby's Dream Land 2) are emulated via the Wii's Virtual Console interface, complete with the "suspending play" and manual features, despite Game Boy titles never being released on the service via the Wii Shop Channel. As a result, the console must be reset in order to switch games. All six games had previously been released separately on the Virtual Console via the Wii Shop Channel and Nintendo eShop on Nintendo 3DS, though Kirby's Dream Land 2 was not yet available in North America at the time of release.

Kirby's Dream Collection also features new challenge stages based on those found in Kirby's Return to Dream Land (2011). Each stage gives Kirby a specific Copy Ability, which he must use to clear the stage and achieve a high score, being awarded a medal based on the player's performance. Completing challenges will unlock additional stages where Kirby must defeat Magolor in a race. A museum section features video spotlights and 3D box art for every game in the Kirby series released through 2012, positioned in a timeline alongside real world historical events from each game's release year. The museum also includes three viewable episodes from the anime television series Kirby: Right Back at Ya! ("Kirby Comes to Cappy Town", "Crusade for the Blade", and "Waddle While You Work"). In addition to the game disc, the package includes Kirby’s 20th Anniversary Celebration Book, a booklet highlighting Kirby's history and providing behind-the-scenes trivia about the series. It also includes a 45-track soundtrack CD, containing 42 music tracks from past Kirby games and 3 new arrangements by the HAL Laboratory sound team.

== Release ==
In April 2012, Scott Moffitt of Nintendo of America elaborated on Nintendo's plans to celebrate the 20th anniversary of the Kirby series, including mention of a compilation game. The compilation's title was first confirmed at E3 2012, followed by the list of included games in an issue of CoroCoro Comic. Further information was detailed during a Nintendo Direct presentation on June 21, 2012 by Satoru Iwata. The game was released in Japan on July 19, 2012, and in North America on September 16, 2012. It was never released in PAL regions, and was the final first-party Wii game released in North America.

To promote the compilation, Nintendo invited attendees at PAX Prime 2012 to help break a Guinness World Record for most simultaneous chewing gum bubbles blown at once. The record was successfully broken with 536 bubbles, exceeding the previous record of 304 set in 2010, and participants received Kirby T-shirts. Players who registered the game through the Club Nintendo rewards program were entered into a raffle to win special Kirby-themed playing cards, with a limited edition medal also being offered. In Japan, the game was also promoted on an episode of the Game Center CX television series.

== Reception ==
=== Critical reception ===
Reception

Aggregate scores
Aggregator	Score
GameRankings	81.29%
Metacritic	82/100

Review scores
Publication	Score
1Up.com	A
Destructoid	8/10
Electronic Gaming Monthly	8/10
Nintendo Life	8/10
Nintendo Power	8.5/10
Nintendo World Report	8/10
HonestGamers	4/5

Kirby's Dream Collection received generally positive reviews according to the review aggregators Metacritic and GameRankings. Critics praised the quality of the games and the amount of content included in the collection, though some criticized the awkward use of the Virtual Console interface when switching games. Others lamented the absence of more obscure spinoff games like Kirby's Pinball Land and Kirby's Dream Course, which they felt would have added more variety and appeal. Ray Carsillo of Electronic Gaming Monthly found the controls of each game "translate perfectly to the Wiimote", claiming Kirby 64 felt better with a Wii Remote than a Nintendo 64 controller. Wired claimed it provided "undeniable fun for the whole family", serving as a nice tribute to the Kirby series. Ben Reeves of Game Informer wrote "[n]early every game in this collection is worth playing", each with gameplay that "stands the test of time". Katharine Byrne of Nintendojo considered it a "perfect package for any Kirby fan", while Justin Cheng writing for Nintendo Power considered it a valuable package, but wished for some minor issues present in the included games to be fixed, such as slowdown present in Kirby's Adventure. Winda Benedetti of NBC News stated the bonus material was fantastic, with Jason Venter of HonestGamers highlighting the soundtrack CD as a valuable inclusion. Matthew Osborne of Nintendo World Report found it interesting that real-world facts were displayed in the History of Kirby museum, such as Barack Obama being elected as President of the United States in 2008. Kirby's Dream Collection was compared favorably by multiple press outlets to Nintendo's previous anniversary compilation, the 2010 Wii re-release of Super Mario All-Stars (1993). Marty Sliva and Jeremy Parish, two writers for 1Up.com, considered the re-release a poor celebration of the Super Mario franchise's 25th anniversary, with Parish comparing Kirby's Dream Collection to be "far, far better".

=== Sales ===
Kirby's Dream Collection sold over 100,000 copies in Japan during its first week of release. It topped the first position of the Japanese weekly sales charts, outperforming Pokémon Black 2 and White 2 and the newly released Rune Factory 4. It remained on the Famitsu top 30 sales charts for eight consecutive weeks, selling a total of 225,772 copies in Japan. It was Nintendo's second best-selling title on the Wii in 2012, selling less than Mario Party 9 in Japan.
