= Kirby Battle Royale =

2017 video game

- Cover art
- Developer: HAL Laboratory
- Publisher: Nintendo
- Director: Tadashi Kawai
- Producers: Hiroyuki Hayashi; Hitoshi Yamagami
- Artist: Ayaka Kimura
- Composers: Megumi Ohara; Shogo Sakai
- Series: Kirby
- Platform: Nintendo 3DS
- Release: JP: November 30, 2017; WW: January 19, 2018
- Genres: Action, adventure, brawler (Battle Arena only)
- Modes: Single-player, multiplayer

Kirby Battle Royale (Note: Kirby Battle Deluxe! (Japanese: カービィ バトルデラックス！, Hepburn: Kābī Batoru Derakkusu!)) is a 2017 action–adventure video game developed by HAL Laboratory and published by Nintendo for the Nintendo 3DS as a spinoff installment in the Kirby series. The game was released in Japan on November 30, 2017, and in North America, Europe and Australia on January 19, 2018.

Kirby Battle Royale's gameplay centers around up to four player characters, individually controlled by either a human player or artificial intelligence, competing in a variety of multiplayer game modes, some of which involve utilizing Copy Abilities to battle other players. The game also features a single-player story mode and supports both local and online multiplayer.

The game received mixed reviews, with criticism being largely directed toward its limited amount of content and repetitive game modes.

== Gameplay ==
Kirby Battle Royale is a party/arena fighting game video game played primarily from a top-down perspective. Players control the series' titular protagonist Kirby and must battle against other versions of himself in an arena. The game features a single-player story campaign along with cooperative play and multiplayer battle modes that are available to play locally and online.

There are a total of 10 game modes plus "The Cake Royale" story mode.

- The Cake Royale: Dedede sets up a tournament full of colored Kirby clones. Kirby fights through, playing different game modes through five "leagues."
- Battle Arena: The player must defeat all of the opponents and be the last one standing. However, the opposing players can revive given enough time.
- Apple Scramble: Players split into two teams and must harvest and collect more apples than the opponent.
- Coin Clash: Players must collect the most coins in the set time limit while avoiding a coin-draining ghost.
- Attack Riders: Players must collect "chips" by hitting other players. Machines appear at times, and attacking while on it results in the player getting extra chips.
- Crazy Theater: Players must clear a certain task before the opponents, including tasks like "carry X apples", "attack your rivals", and "Avoid the [bomb] blast."
- Rocket Rumble: Players collect fuel cubes and try to get them in their ships. The more cubes, the higher the rocket goes. To win, the player must fly the highest.
- Robo Bonkers: Players must attack a robotic version of Bonkers. To win, they must deal the most damage.
- Slam Hockey: The players must attack a giant hockey puck and knock it at the opponents to score.
- Ore Express: Players must collect ore and throw it in a passing train. The player who collects the most ore wins.
- Flag Ball: The players must throw a ball at their flag to score, but the opposing team can carry the flag and attack the player. The team who scores seven goals first wins.

The abilities featured in game, in order of listing, are: Sword, Bomb, Beetle, Spear, Cutter, Fighter, Ninja, Whip, Parasol, Hammer, Doctor, Tornado, and Ice, as well as Mirror and Sleep, which were introduced in a free update for the game. Alongside the 15 base abilities, three other playable characters are in the game: Waddle Dee, Meta Knight, and King Dedede. The three characters function similarly to the Parasol, Sword, and Hammer abilities respectively (albeit with a few unique moves).

Thirteen of the abilities were available upon initial launch, with Mirror being made available via free software update in Europe and Japan, and Sleep was made available via another software update; both poll winners have been made available in North America via a free software update as well.

== Plot ==
Kirby is sleeping under a tree when he receives a flyer inviting him to King Dedede's Cake Royale, which promises a grand prize of "the cake of your dreams". On his way to King Dedede's castle, Kirby encounters an exhausted Bandana Waddle Dee, who also desires the cake. While carrying Bandana Waddle Dee to the castle, Kirby is ambushed by a blue doppelgänger of himself, whom he promptly defeats. Upon arriving at the castle, Kirby and Bandana Waddle Dee discover that King Dedede is using a machine known as the Kirby Printer to create different-colored clones of Kirby.

As Kirby and Bandana Waddle Dee advance through the tournament's beginner, bronze, silver, gold, and platinum leagues, defeating Meta Knight along the way, King Dedede becomes increasingly aggravated by Kirby's success. As Kirby and Bandana Waddle Dee are completing the platinum league, King Dedede takes on the duo in the championship battle, only to be defeated. However, the king then challenges Kirby to a three-against-one duel, which he also loses. Refusing to allow Kirby to win his tournament, King Dedede uses a giant robot in a last-ditch effort to defeat Kirby, though he is beaten yet again. Both the robot and the Kirby Printer are destroyed, causing all of Kirby's clones to disappear. Kirby and Bandana Waddle Dee are then finally awarded their cake.

== Development and release ==
Kirby Battle Royale was developed by HAL Laboratory and published by Nintendo for the Nintendo 3DS. The game was directed by Tadashi Kawai, who would later also direct the fighting games Super Kirby Clash (2019) and Kirby Fighters 2 (2020). It was released as part of the 25th anniversary of the Kirby series.

Kirby Battle Royale was first teased during a Nintendo Direct on April 12, 2017, which announced two Kirby titles for the Nintendo eShop (Team Kirby Clash Deluxe and Kirby's Blowout Blast), as well as an upcoming Kirby multiplayer action game for the 3DS. The game's official name was revealed within a subsequent Direct on September 13, 2017. A demo was released in Europe via the Nintendo eShop on October 19, 2017, featuring three playable game modes (Battle Arena, Apple Scramble, and Crazy Theater) and three Copy Abilities (Sword, Cutter, and Beetle), as well as allowing Meta Knight to be unlocked as a playable character early. The demo was later released in North America on January 4, 2018. Kirby Battle Royale was released in Australia on November 4, 2017; in Europe on November 10, 2017; in Japan on November 30, 2017; and in North America on January 19, 2018.

Prior to the game's official release, Nintendo held a poll in North America, Japan, and Europe to determine the five favorite Copy Abilities in each region. The Mirror ability won in North America, and was consequently added to Kirby Battle Royale. A second poll, held after the game's release, resulted in the Sleep ability winning in all three regions; this ability was later added into the game as well.

== Reception ==
=== Critical response ===
Reception

Aggregate scores
Aggregator	Score
Metacritic	57/100
OpenCritic	3% recommend

Review scores
Publication	Score
Destructoid	5.5/10
Famitsu	7/10, 7/10, 8/10, 8/10
Hardcore Gamer	3/5
Nintendo Life	5/10
Nintendo World Report	6.5/10; 5/10
Shacknews	6/10
CGMagazine	6/10
Gamereactor	5/10

Kirby Battle Royale received "mixed or average" reviews from critics, according to the review aggregation website Metacritic, which tied it with Team Kirby Clash Deluxe as the lowest-rated Kirby game. Fellow review aggregator OpenCritic assessed that the game received weak approval, being recommended by 3% of critics. In Japan, four critics from Famitsu gave the game a total score of 30 out of 40.

=== Sales ===
Kirby Battle Royale sold 28,000 units within its first week on sale in Japan, debuting at #5 on the software sales chart, behind Pokémon Ultra Sun and Ultra Moon, Xenoblade Chronicles 2, Super Mario Odyssey, and Splatoon 2.
