= Kirby: Planet Robobot =

2016 video game for the 3DS

- Developer: HAL Laboratory
- Publisher: Nintendo
- Director: Shinya Kumazaki
- Producers: Satoshi Mitsuhara; Hitoshi Yamagami
- Designer: Yuki Endo
- Programmer: Yoshihiro Nagata
- Artist: Monami Matsuura
- Composers: Hirokazu Ando; Jun Ishikawa
- Series: Kirby
- Platform: Nintendo 3DS
- Release: JP/KO: April 28, 2016; NA/EU: June 10, 2016; AU: June 11, 2016
- Genre: Platform
- Modes: Single-player, multiplayer

Kirby: Planet Robobot (Note: Known in Japan as Hoshi no Kābi: Robobo Puranetto (星のカービィ ロボボプラネット; lit. Kirby of the Stars: Robobo Planet)) is a 2016 platform game developed by HAL Laboratory and published by Nintendo for the Nintendo 3DS. It is the eleventh mainline installment in the Kirby series and the spiritual successor to Triple Deluxe. The story follows Kirby as he defends Planet Popstar from an alien corporation known as the Haltmann Works Company that wishes to mechanize the planet so that they can plunder its natural resources. New to the series in this game is Kirby's ability to utilize a mecha suit known as the Robobot Armor to solve puzzles and fight enemies.

The game was released in Japan in April 2016 and worldwide in June 2016. Like Triple Deluxe, enhanced versions of the two minigames featured in the game, Team Kirby Clash Deluxe (Note: Known in Japan as Minna de ! Kābī Hantāzu Zuī (みんなで!カービィハンターズＺ; lit. With Everyone! Kirby Hunters Z)) and Kirby's Blowout Blast, (Note: Known in Japan as Kābī no Suikomi Daisakusen (カービィのすいこみ大作戦; lit. Kirby's Suction Strategy)) were released in the Nintendo eShop as standalone titles in April 2017 and July 2017, respectively. It received highly positive reviews, with praise going to the soundtrack, graphics, gameplay, and new features including the robobot armour and the armour's ability mechanic. However, similar to past entries, the game's low difficulty was criticized.

== Gameplay ==
Planet Robobot follows a similar gameplay style to the previous Nintendo 3DS title, Kirby: Triple Deluxe, taking advantage of the system's 3D capabilities by allowing Kirby to move between multiple planes in stages. Like most games in the series, Kirby is able to inhale enemies and spit them out to attack other enemies or swallow them in order to absorb their powers. Additionally, players can gain abilities and items by scanning Amiibo figures. New to this game is a mech suit known as the Robobot Armor that Kirby can pilot, allowing him to destroy certain obstacles, lift heavy objects, and defeat large enemies. Like Kirby, the Robobot Armor can gain variations on these abilities by scanning enemies; this can then be used to attack enemies and solve puzzles. Hidden throughout each level are Code Cubes, which are needed to progress and unlock bonus levels, and collectible stickers which can be used to customise the Robobot Armor.

=== Minigames ===
Planet Robobot features two additional minigames: Team Kirby Clash and Kirby 3D Rumble. Team Kirby Clash is an action role-playing game in which up to four players choose a character class and work together to fight large bosses, earning experience along the way. Kirby 3D Rumble is a single-player game in which Kirby must travel along a 3D plane to inhale and shoot waves of enemies as quickly as possible. Clearing the main game unlocks two additional modes; Meta Knightmare Returns, in which players control Meta Knight through a harder version of the main campaign, and The Arena, where players fight multiple boss characters with limited healing items. The game also features support for StreetPass and Miiverse. There is also a harder variant of The Arena known as The True Arena, which has players fight bosses from Meta Knightmare Returns as Kirby, and a new secret boss.

== Plot ==
One day, a massive spacecraft called the Access Ark suddenly conquers and mechanizes Kirby's home, Planet Popstar. King Dedede and Meta Knight try to fight back, but Castle Dedede and Meta Knight's airship, the Halberd, are both easily destroyed by a single shot of the ship's laser defense systems. Kirby, who slept through the entire invasion, awakens to find his planet being stripped of its energy and sets off to make things right.

Kirby destroys the five bases across the five corners of Planet Popstar that serve as the Access Ark's landing legs. In the midst of doing so, he acquires the Robobot Armor, a mysterious power suit that adapts to and enhances his powers of absorbing and copying abilities. Kirby also encounters an alien secretary of the Haltmann Works Company named Susie, who claims to be gathering endemic natural resources from the planet's ecosystems for her boss, President Max Profitt Haltmann, the president and CEO of the Haltmann Works Company, who has been following the business plans of a supercomputer named Star Dream. As Kirby fights back against the company's colonization, he also battles Clanky Woods (a cybernetic Whispy Woods), a hologram defense system featuring some of his past enemies, Susie in her power suit, a brainwashed and mechanized Meta Knight renamed "Mecha Knight," and three imperfect clones of Dedede.

After destroying the five bases and rendering the Access Ark immobile, Kirby infiltrates the Ark and confronts Haltmann after freeing Meta Knight from his brainwashing. Haltmann fires Susie for failing to stop Kirby. He then duels Kirby in his own power suit but is defeated. Enraged, Haltmann attempts to use Star Dream to destroy Kirby, but is betrayed by Susie, who intends on selling the machine to other companies. However, Star Dream becomes self-aware, possesses Haltmann's body, and attacks Susie. Star Dream then announces that all organic life-forms are obstacles in Haltmann Works' business plan of prosperity, assimilates Haltmann, and embarks on a mission of intergalactic destruction. As Susie reawakens and, with a change of heart, implores Kirby to stop Star Dream, Meta Knight returns with the repaired Halberd and Kirby fuses it with his Robobot Armor to confront the supercomputer.

Kirby fights and destroys Star Dream, but it revives and takes control of the Access Ark, transforming itself into a sentient, mechanical planet. As Kirby destroys its armor, the true identity of Star Dream and the Access Ark is revealed - a Galactic NOVA, one of the clockwork wish-granting comets used by Marx in Kirby Super Star. With Haltmann's consciousness fading, Star Dream goes on a rampage and damages the Halberd before Meta Knight ejects Kirby from the airship, who screams as he destroys Star Dream with a gigantic drill. Kirby's dying robot uses the last of its power to send him back to Popstar. Haltmann's machines magically erode, returning Popstar to its natural state. As Dedede awakens in the wreckage of his castle and Susie leaves the planet, quickly pursued by Meta Knight, Kirby rushes off on his next big quest after waving goodbye.

=== Optional scenes ===
In the final stage of the bonus mode Meta Knightmare Returns, Star Dream wakes up and appoints Meta Knight the new CEO of the Haltmann Works Company for defeating Haltmann. To prove Meta Knight's worth, Star Dream engages a special combat program that summons clones of Dark Matter (from Kirby's Dream Land 2) and Queen Sectonia (from Kirby: Triple Deluxe) for him to fight. Once both clones are destroyed, Star Dream activates a dimensional portal and summons Galacta Knight. Before the fight starts, however, Galacta Knight destroys Star Dream. After he is defeated, he is sealed in his crystal once again.

At the end of The True Arena, Star Dream is wounded by Galacta Knight and becomes Star Dream Soul OS. After disabling it with the Halberd, Kirby attempts to use his Robobot Armor to finish off Star Dream but is instead inhaled. Inside, Kirby finds the heart of the Galactic Nova. As Kirby destroys each of the pillars surrounding the heart, Haltmann screams in agony as Star Dream deletes him from its systems. By the time Kirby destroys the last pillar, Haltmann has been completely erased and Star Dream fights Kirby directly. Once defeated, Star Dream disintegrates.

== Development ==
These are the four Amiibo released alongside the release of the game. From left to right, they are Kirby, Meta Knight, King Dedede, and Waddle Dee.

Planet Robobot was conceived as more of a direct successor to Kirby: Triple Deluxe early in development. The game would have featured the Hypernova ability, though it was eventually replaced with the Robobot Armor in order to avoid retreading old ground.

Susie was created by Akihiro Kanno, Shinya Kumazaki, Tsuyoshi Fujita, Etsuko Sato and Kenichiro Kita. According to Shinya Kumazaki, Susie's name comes from Sūji, a Japanese word for Digit.

Star Dream was voiced by Shinya Kumazaki's pet cat, Tom and its weathercock was voiced by Hirokazu Ando's pet chicken, Nago.

Kirby: Planet Robobot was originally going to be titled Kirby Triple Deluxe 2, Kirby: HAGANE, Kirby: Robot Planet and Roborobo Planet.

This is the last Kirby game Satoru Iwata produced, as he died of bile duct cancer on July 11, 2015, nine months before the game was released.

The game was unveiled at a Nintendo Direct on March 3, 2016. A set of Kirby themed Amiibo (consisting of Kirby, King Dedede, Meta Knight, and Waddle Dee) has been released with the game's release date, and offer unique gameplay changes. The game was released in Japan on April 28, 2016, and in June 2016 worldwide. A demo for the game was released through the Nintendo eShop on July 21, 2016.

Following the release of the original game, it was announced from an April 2017 Nintendo Direct that two minigames from Planet Robobot would be released as standalone titles in honor of Kirby's 25th anniversary. The first, released in April 2017, is Team Kirby Clash Deluxe, which expands on the minigame's action role-playing elements with additional levels and features. It is free to download and play, though in-game currency can be bought through microtransactions. The second, released in July 2017, is Kirby's Blowout Blast, a 3D platformer based on the gameplay of Kirby 3D Rumble.

Team Kirby Clash Deluxe would later receive a follow-up on the Nintendo Switch in September 2019, titled Super Kirby Clash, using the Kirby Star Allies engine. It features online play, more quests, and more gear. Like its predecessor, it is free to download and play, but contains microtransactions to buy in-game currency.

== Reception ==
Reception

Aggregate scores
Aggregator	Score
Metacritic	81/100
OpenCritic	86% recommend

Review scores
Publication	Score
Destructoid	7/10
Electronic Gaming Monthly	9/10
Famitsu	36/40
Game Informer	8/10
GameRevolution	4/5
GameSpot	8/10
GamesTM	8/10
IGN	8/10
Nintendo Life	9/10
Nintendo World Report	9/10
Polygon	8/10
Shacknews	8/10
USgamer	4/5
CGMagazine	9/10

Kirby: Planet Robobot received "generally favorable" reviews, according to the review aggregation website Metacritic. Fellow review aggregator OpenCritic assessed that the game received "mighty" approval, being recommended by 86% of critics. In Japan, four critics from Famitsu gave the game a total score of 36 out of 40, with each critic awarding the game a 9 out of 10. GameSpot awarded the game an 8 out of 10, praising the gameplay, level design, characters, visuals, soundtrack, and extra modes, but criticized the "rarely challenging" difficulty. IGN's Brendan Graeber rated the game an 8.0, praising its clever use of 3D-based puzzles in vibrant worlds, boss fights, the Robobot mech, and additional modes, but criticized the difficulty and invulnerably easy blocking. Thomas Whitehead of Nintendo Life really enjoyed the game's main story mode.

Ollie Barder of Forbes gave it a positive review, comparing it to the mecha anime series Gurren Lagann. Destructoid's Chris Carter gave it a 7 out of 10, stating, "While the robot motif comes in half-cocked, Planet Robobot is still a safe, serviceable Kirby game. After beating the story and reflecting on it, many elements felt like just going through the motions, but those motions haven't gotten stale yet after nearly 25 years."

During the 20th Annual D.I.C.E. Awards, the Academy of Interactive Arts & Sciences nominated Kirby: Planet Robobot for "Handheld Game of the Year".

As of June 2016, it has sold 300,479 copies in Japan. By the end of March 2017, total sales reached 1.36 million copies.
