= Kirby Mass Attack =

2011 video game

- North American box art
- Developer: HAL Laboratory
- Publisher: Nintendo
- Director: Mari Shirakawa
- Producers: Masanobu Yamamoto; Yoichi Yamamoto; Yasushi Adachi
- Designer: Yoshihisa Maeda
- Programmer: Hiroyuki Hayashi
- Composer: Shogo Sakai
- Series: Kirby
- Platform: Nintendo DS
- Release: JP: August 4, 2011; NA: September 19, 2011; AU: October 27, 2011; EU: October 28, 2011
- Genre: Platform
- Mode: Single-player

Kirby Mass Attack (Note: Known in Japan as Atsumete! Kirby (あつめて！カービィ, Atsumete! Kābī; Gather! Kirby)) is a 2011 platform game developed by HAL Laboratory and published by Nintendo for the Nintendo DS. Part of the Kirby series, it is the fourth and last game in the series to be released for the DS. The game was later released for the Wii U's Virtual Console.

== Gameplay ==
Kirby Mass Attack is a platform game with elements similar to that of the Lemmings series. Like Kirby: Canvas Curse, the player does not directly play the game with a directional pad, face buttons or shoulder buttons. Instead, the player only uses the stylus and touch screen on the DS to play the game. The game is played by using the stylus to command up to ten Kirbys on the screen. Tapping the screen creates a star that the Kirbys can follow or cling onto. By tapping enemies or obstacles on the screen, players can send multiple Kirbys to attack them, with the player also able to flick individual Kirbys as projectiles. By collecting pieces of fruit throughout the level, the player can gain up to ten controllable Kirbys, which allow players to tackle enemies and obstacles more easily than with one Kirby. Each level often requires a minimum number of Kirbys to enter, and some puzzles will require all ten Kirbys to solve. If a Kirby is hit by an enemy or obstacle, it will turn blue until the end of the level, or until the player finds a special gate which restores their health. If a blue Kirby is hit, he will turn grey and float away unless the player can drag him down and turn him blue again, with the game ending if the player runs out of Kirbys or fails a certain level objective. Hidden throughout each game are several medals, found either by exploring, solving puzzles or finding keys and treasure chests, which in turn unlock additional minigames and bonus features. Some levels also feature large lollipops that temporarily make all the Kirbys bigger, allowing them to break through barriers and reach new areas.

== Plot ==
Visiting and exploring the Popopo Islands archipelago, Kirby takes a nap just as Necrodeus, the evil leader of the Skull Gang, appears for his conquest of Planet Popstar. Using his magical staff, Necrodeus strikes Kirby, disassembling him into a decade of inferior doppelgängers, each of which only possess a fraction of the original's power. After Necrodeus promptly dispatches all but one of the Kirbys, the remaining one soon becomes guided by a star-based object, which is his own heroic heart. After journeying through the Popopo Islands, he and the nine other Kirbys defeat Necrodeus at his intergalactic home region and use his staff's power to assemble themselves back into their original form.

== Development and release ==
Under the direction of Mari Shirakawa and produced by Masanobu Yamamoto, Kirby Mass Attack was developed out of a desire from HAL Laboratory to integrate new and unique gameplay styles into the Kirby series; thus, focus was shifted away from Copy Abilities, which were typically a core aspect of Kirby games, and focused more on the idea of group management. While the team deeply considered including Copy Abilities as a mechanic, the development team decided to exclude it, after several talks with Nintendo and Senior Producer Kensuke Tanabe, in order to maintain focus on the game's new gameplay ideas, as well as avoid overcomplicating the use of multiple Kirby copies at once. Because of the nature of controlling several Kirby's at once, level design was kept simple in order to require less "athleticism" that is generally utilized in most platforming stages. High scores and collectible medals were used as features so that stages would be given more replayability and challenge, and also because the idea complimented the group management concept.

Despite being released well after the reveal of the Nintendo 3DS, Kirby Mass Attack was still developed on the DS rather than being released on the newer console. According to Shirakawa, this was partially because the game would not have taken extensive advantage of the system's stereoscopic 3D capabilities, meaning that making it for the 3DS would have been pointless.

Kirby Mass Attack was announced and shown at E3 2011. It was released in Japan on August 4, 2011, in North America on September 19, 2011, and in PAL regions in October 2011. The game was re-released on the Wii U's Virtual Console in 2016.

== Media ==
A five volume manga of the series, titled Atsumete! Kirby (あつめて！カービィ, Atsumete! Kābī; lit. "Gather! Kirby") was written by Chisato Seki and illustrated by Yumi Tsukirino. It was published in Japan from 2016 by Asahi Production, serialized in the online social networking service Facebook. Atsumete! Kirby ended in 2016. Three special volumes of the manga came out in Japan called "Kirby MASTER" (カービィマスター, Kābī Masutā), which had all the pages for each manga in color and has brand-new stories.

== Reception ==
Reception

Aggregate score
Aggregator	Score
Metacritic	83/100

Review scores
Publication	Score
1Up.com	A−
Destructoid	9.5/10
Eurogamer	8/10
Famitsu	36/40
Game Informer	8.5/10
GamePro	4.5/5
GameSpot	8.5/10
GamesRadar+	4/5
GameTrailers	8.1/10
IGN	8.5/10
Joystiq	4/5
Nintendo Life	9/10
Nintendo Power	8/10
Nintendo World Report	8.5/10

Kirby Mass Attack received "generally favorable" reviews, according to the review aggregation website Metacritic. Destructoid said, "Cleverly designed, overwhelmingly cute, and devoted to fun, Kirby Mass Attack is a game that should become part of your handheld library without question." 1UP.com said it was a "brilliant game". In Japan, Famitsu gave it a score of all four nines for a total of 36 out of 40.

During the 15th Annual Interactive Achievement Awards, the Academy of Interactive Arts & Sciences nominated Kirby Mass Attack for "Handheld Game of the Year".
