= Kirby Fighters Deluxe =

- Developer: HAL Laboratory
- Publisher: Nintendo
- Director: Shinya Kumazaki
- Series: Kirby
- Platform: Nintendo 3DS
- Release: JP: July 23, 2014; NA: August 29, 2014; KO: September 24, 2014; EU: February 13, 2015; AU: February 13, 2015
- Genre: Fighting game
- Modes: single-player, multiplayer

Kirby Fighters Deluxe (Note: Japanese: カービィファイターズZ, Hepburn: Kābyi Faitāzu Z) is a Kirby series spin-off fighting game featuring Kirby with different copy abilities as fighters. It was developed by HAL Laboratory and published by Nintendo on the Nintendo 3DS eShop. it was released in Japan on July 23, 2014 with a North American release in August, a Korean release in September, and a European and Australian release coming out in February of the next year. it was based off of and expanded upon the Kirby Fighters Minigame included in Kirby: Triple Deluxe.

As of March 2023 the game is no longer playable due to the closure of the Nintendo eShop for 3DS and Wii U.

== Gameplay ==
Kirby Fighters Deluxe is a fighting game that is often compared to the Super Smash Bros. series of games. it features 12 stages to fight on, with one of them requiring Streetpass data for Kirby: Triple Deluxe to unlock. There is 12 different playable copy abilities to choose from that come from previous Kirby games: Parasol, Sword, Beam, Hammer, Ninja, Cutter, Whip, Archer, Fighter, and Bomb. Two additional playable copy abilities not present in the Kirby:Triple Deluxe minigame, Bell and Beetle, can be unlocked by having Streetpass data for Kirby: Triple Deluxe on the system. The game has a single player mode where you go through a series of nine battles against bosses and other Kirbys using one copy ability to try and achieve a high score time. The multiplayer mode allows for up to four players on multiple systems to fight against each other.

== Reception ==
Reception

Aggregate score
Aggregator	Score
Metacritic	66/100

Review scores
Publication	Score
Nintendo Life	8/10
Nintendo World Report	7/10
The Guardian	2/5

The game received "mixed or average" reviews according to the Review aggregation website Metacritic.

Nintendo Life gave the game a score of 8/10 stars, praising the local multiplayer, simple controls, and accessibility. they recommended it for Kirby series fans and fans of fighting games, while also criticizing the lack of online multiplayer.

The Guardian scored the game at 2/5 stars, saying that the minigame from Kirby Triple Deluxe it was based on was "not compelling enough to warrant a full release."
