= Super Kirby Clash =

2019 video game

- Game art featuring the team of Kirbys as the four classes
- Developers: HAL Laboratory; Vanpool
- Publisher: Nintendo
- Directors: Shinya Kumazaki; Yumi Todo; Tadashi Kawai; Jun Tsuda
- Producers: Tadashi Kamitake; Hitoshi Yamagami
- Composers: Kiyoshi Hazemoto; Hirokazu Ando; Jun Ishikawa
- Series: Kirby
- Platform: Nintendo Switch
- Release: September 4, 2019
- Genre: Action role-playing
- Modes: Single-player, multiplayer

Super Kirby Clash (Note: Japanese: スーパーカービィハンターズ, Hepburn: Sūpā Kābii Hantāzu; lit. 'Super Kirby Hunters') is a 2019 free-to-play action role-playing game developed by HAL Laboratory and Vanpool and published by Nintendo. A spin-off title in the Kirby series, it has players control a team of Kirbys as they fight a variety of enemies to complete quests and defeat the villain Parallel Nightmare. Each battle features four Kirbys, with the player controlling one and the other three being controlled either by the game or other players. These Kirbys can each take on one of four classes: Sword Hero, Hammer Lord, Beam Mage, and Doctor Healmore, each with unique abilities. The game also prominently features microtransactions through its Gem Apple currency, which can be used to purchase stronger gear and unlock new quests.

Super Kirby Clash is a sequel to Team Kirby Clash Deluxe (2016) for the Nintendo 3DS, which is an expanded version of a minigame from Kirby: Planet Robobot (2016) for the same console. It was announced in a Nintendo Direct on September 4, 2019, and released for the Nintendo Switch that day, reaching over four million downloads by the end of the year. It received mixed reviews, with the battles being praised but the use of microtransactions being criticized.

== Gameplay ==
A group of players fighting Ignite Edge, one of the enemies in the game

Super Kirby Clash is an action role-playing game where players control Kirby and his team, who must complete quests by fighting a variety of different enemies. It features over 100 quests for players to complete. There are four Kirbys in the game. One Kirby is controlled by the player, and the others can be controlled by CPU players or other players, either locally or online. The player can choose a class for their Kirby and purchase equipment to make their Kirby stronger. They can begin a quest by interacting with a job board in-game.

The game features four classes: Sword Hero, Hammer Lord, Beam Mage, and Doctor Healmore. Sword Hero uses fast-moving sword attacks, while Hammer Lord is slower-moving but deals more damage. Doctor Healmore can heal the other Kirbys, and Beam Mage uses ranged attacks that can disable bosses. Once the boss has sustained enough damage, it drops four shards, which activate a minigame to attack the boss with a massive meteor, which will deal heavy damage to them if successful.

After every quest, whether the player wins or loses, they will gain experience, with increased experience gained from online battles. This experience allows the player to level up and increase Kirby's stats, making him more powerful. Each quest also costs the player a resource called Vigor to attempt, which takes time to recharge. If the player does not have enough Vigor remaining, they cannot attempt quests until it recharges.

In between quests, players go to a small town which serves as a hub world. In this area, players can purchase equipment and select a quest to complete. They can also input codes found online, known as "passwords", to get free items. The game features a currency called Gem Apples, which are used to buy equipment and unlock new quests. Players can purchase these Gem Apples through microtransactions, but they can also be obtained through normal gameplay.

== Plot ==
A large number of monsters begin to threaten the Dream Kingdom, with Kirby choosing to help fight them. Kirby forms a group of fellow Kirbys, named Team Kirby, to stop the threat. Team Kirby advances through the realm, defeating monsters, until they encounter Parallel Nightmare, the mastermind behind the threat. Team Kirby defeats him, and he flees to an area called the Empyrean.

Team Kirby advances towards the Empyrean while vanquishing more monsters. As they do, they encounter Taranza, who they think is Parallel Nightmare. After defeating Taranza, they proceed to the Decisive Battlefield, where they encounter Parallel Nightmare again. As they prepare to fight him, he summons a villain named King D-Mind to fight them. King D-Mind turns on Parallel Nightmare and flings him away, though Team Kirby is able to defeat him.

The threat appears to be over, but the monsters return, stronger than before. Team Kirby defeats more monsters and discovers that Parallel Nightmare survived. They chase him to another realm called the Dreamscape and defeat him again. Parallel Nightmare summons a powerful warrior called Aeon Hero to fight them. Aeon Hero kills Parallel Nightmare and engages Team Kirby, but is defeated. After Aeon Hero's defeat, peace is restored to the land.

== Development and release ==
Super Kirby Clash is a sequel to Team Kirby Clash Deluxe (2016), which is an expanded version of the Team Kirby Clash minigame from Kirby: Planet Robobot (2016). It was developed using the same engine as Kirby Star Allies (2018). HAL Laboratory co-developed the game with frequent partner Vanpool. Tadashi Kawai, the director of Kirby Battle Royale (2017), applied his knowledge from that game to develop the cooperative multiplayer elements.

Several enemies from previous Kirby games were added to Super Kirby Clash, with the game being some enemies' first HD appearance. Variants of some enemies with different designs and attributes are also featured, such as the boss Ignite Edge, who is an alternate version of the character Gigant Edge with a flaming sword.

Super Kirby Clash was announced during a Nintendo Direct on September 4, 2019, and released on the same day. Later that month, Nintendo held a Tetris 99 (2019) Maximus Cup themed around it. The rewards, obtained for getting more than 100 points, were a Kirby-based theme in Tetris 99 and 99 Gem Apples in Super Kirby Clash. In December 2019, the game reached four million downloads, prompting HAL Laboratory to host a temporary twenty-percent off sale on its Gem Apple currency.

== Reception ==
Reception

Aggregate score
Aggregator	Score
Metacritic	74/100

Review score
Publication	Score
Nintendo Life	8/10

Super Kirby Clash received "mixed or average" reviews according to video game review aggregator Metacritic. Several reviewers listed it as one of the best free games available on the Switch.

The battles were generally received positively, particularly when done with friends in multiplayer. Writing for Nintendo Life, reviewer Mitch Vogel compared the game to the Monster Hunter franchise, praising its handling of its RPG elements. The online multiplayer received mixed reception, with Vogel criticizing it and saying it had issues with input lag, while other reviewers received the mode more positively. Kotaku reviewer Mike Fahey also praised the game's cute visuals.

The game was criticized for its inclusion of microtransactions, with reviewers disliking how much content centers around the Gem Apple currency. However, some also noted that no purchases are required to complete the game, with the microtransactions simply speeding up progression.

== See also ==
- List of Kirby media
- List of Nintendo Switch games
- 2019 in video games
