= Kirby and the Rainbow Curse =

2015 video game

- North American box art
- Developer: HAL Laboratory (Note: Co-produced and supervised by Nintendo Software Planning & Development)
- Publisher: Nintendo
- Director: Kazushige Masuda
- Producers: Shigefumi Kawase; Kensuke Tanabe
- Artist: Teruhiko Suzuki
- Composers: Shogo Sakai; Megumi Ohara
- Series: Kirby
- Platform: Wii U
- Release: JP: January 22, 2015; NA: February 20, 2015; EU: May 8, 2015; AU: May 9, 2015
- Genre: Platform
- Modes: Single-player, multiplayer

Kirby and the Rainbow Curse, (Note: Known in Japan as Touch! Kirby Super Rainbow (タッチ！カービィ スーパーレインボー, Tatchi! Kābī Sūpāreinbō)) known in PAL regions as Kirby and the Rainbow Paintbrush, is a 2015 platform game developed by HAL Laboratory and published by Nintendo for Wii U. The game is part of the Kirby series and a follow-up game of the 2005 Nintendo DS title Kirby: Canvas Curse, was released on January 22, 2015 in Japan, February 20, 2015 in North America, May 8, 2015 in Europe, and May 9, 2015 in Australia. The game follows Kirby, Waddle Dee, and Elline, a mythical fairy, who set on a journey to restore color in Dream Land. The game supports the Kirby, Meta Knight, and King Dedede Amiibo.

Kirby and the Rainbow Curse uses a distinct art style resembling claymotion, although real claymotion was used for reference during development and for promotional elements. Upon release, the game received mixed reviews, with the gameplay being a point of debate. However, the game received praise for its art style, soundtrack, and overall charm. It also underperformed commercially.

== Gameplay ==
A pre-release gameplay screenshot of Kirby and the Rainbow Curse. Kirby follows a line drawn on the Wii U GamePad and collects stars scattered around levels to activate the "Star Dash" power-up.

Kirby and the Rainbow Curse carries on the style of gameplay from Canvas Curse, presenting the game with a unique modelling clay look. Players use the Wii U GamePad to help Kirby, who is stuck in a ball form, move across the level by drawing rainbow colored lines on the touchscreen to guide him. Making Kirby go through loops will speed him up, while touching him will put him into a spinning attack to use against enemies. For every 100 stars Kirby collects, Kirby can perform a Star Dash which increases his size, allowing him to charge through normally-indestructible blocks. Similar to Kirby's Epic Yarn, Kirby can gain various forms throughout the game, such as a submarine, a rocket, and a tank. These forms help him progress through the game and provide certain elements that alter the gameplay. Up to three additional players using Wii Remotes can play as Bandana Waddle Dees, who can assist Kirby by carrying him around and attacking enemies. During the levels, an evil hand may try to capture Kirby, with only the Bandana Waddle Dees being able to damage it. Each level contains several hidden treasure chests, some of which require solving a puzzle or clearing a timed room, which unlock viewable clay figures and music tracks. You can get pages of elline's diary at the end of every level. The main story mode in Kirby and the Rainbow Curse has 28 levels, while Challenge Mode has 48.

The game features amiibo support with the Kirby, King Dedede, and Meta Knight figures from the Super Smash Bros. series of amiibo. The Kirby figure allows Kirby to activate the "Star Dash" ability at any time, the King Dedede figure gives Kirby extra HP, and the Meta Knight figure gives him greater attack power during his touch-activated spinning attack.

== Plot ==
One day in Dream Land, as Kirby and Bandana Waddle Dee are seen playing together, a mysterious hole opens in the sky, draining all the color from Dream Land and stopping everything and everyone in its tracks. Elline, a paintbrush fairy from the land of Seventopia, goes through the portal in order to escape several "grab hands" and uses her powers to bring color back to Kirby and Bandana Waddle Dee. She reveals that her best friend, Claycia, suddenly became evil and has used the colors from Kirby's planet, Popstar, in order to create seven worlds, which are made from the colors of the rainbow. Wanting to stop Claycia and restore Planet Popstar's color, Kirby, Bandana Waddle Dee, and Elline set off to Seventopia. In this game, Kirby is "stuck" in a ball-like form similar to Kirby: Canvas Curse.

In the last world's final boss stage, it is revealed that Claycia had been possessed by an evil force known as the Dark Crafter, who has the urge to drain all of the color in a specific place. After pursuing and defeating the Dark Crafter, it finally dissipates into nothingness before exploding. Later, Kirby and his friends return to Dream Land and bring back all of the missing color into Planet Popstar.

The ending scene includes Claycia and Elline making a bushel of apples for Kirby to eat, along with the words "THE END", signaling the end of the game.

== Development ==
When they first saw the Wii U GamePad, the developers realized they could incorporate asymmetric multiplayer into the new Kirby game and decided that, while Wii Remote players would have a more traditional running-and-jumping platformer experience, the GamePad player would draw "footholds". They decided to use the same line-drawing gameplay from Kirby: Canvas Curse. The polymer clay art style was chosen to create a more three-dimensional version of the DS game's painterly style, while the framerate of the animations was kept low so the game would look like it was made in claymation. Waddle Dees were chosen as the multiplayer characters because the developers felt that Meta Knight or King Dedede were not as well-suited to protect Kirby. The game was first announced at E3 2014.

== Reception ==
=== Critical response ===
Reception

Aggregate scores
Aggregator	Score
GameRankings	75%
Metacritic	73/100
OpenCritic	54% recommend

Review scores
Publication	Score
4Players	77/100
Destructoid	9/10
Digital Trends	3.5/5
Edge	8/10
Electronic Gaming Monthly	9/10
Eurogamer	Recommended
Famitsu	34/40
Game Informer	7.75/10
GameRevolution	3/5
GameSpot	5/10
GamesRadar+	4/5
GamesTM	7/10
GameTrailers	7.5/10
Giant Bomb	2/5
Hardcore Gamer	4.5/5
IGN	8.0/10
Nintendo Life	7/10
Nintendo World Report	8/10
Polygon	8.5/10
Shacknews	8/10
The Guardian	4/5
USgamer	5/5
VentureBeat	82/100

Kirby and the Rainbow Curse received mixed reviews. It received an aggregated score of 75% on GameRankings based on 50 reviews and 73/100 on Metacritic based on 72 reviews. Fellow review aggregator OpenCritic assessed that the game received fair approval, being recommended by 54% of critics.

The gameplay received mixed reviews. Famitsu appreciated the simplistic nature of its control scheme, writing "Although guiding a character by drawing lines with the GamePad isn't a new mechanism in itself, the game deserves applause for making it more interesting to play. The visuals are cute and look like clay animation. The game is filled with a surprisingly diverse load of gimmicks so it excites in many ways. The game is packed with the true charm of action games." IGN's Marty Sliva praised the difficulty and vehicle mechanics. On the other hand, in a negative review, Giant Bomb's Dan Ryckert unfavourably compared the game to its DS predecessor. He felt that the levels were too simple and linear, and the collectibles were too easy to reach. He disliked that Kirby could not steal enemies' abilities like in Canvas Curse, and thought that the vehicles Kirby could turn into made certain levels "even more stripped-down." While he found the controls functional, the repetitive boss fights were frustrating due to the stylus' lack of precision. Ryckert preferred to play as a Waddle Dee, whose traditional control scheme afforded more reliable platforming and boss fighting than the "unreliable stylus paths" provided.Hardcore Gamer's Dermot Creegan praised its challenges and collectibles.

The art style received acclaim. Sliva reviews the visuals as "absolutely gorgeous," praising details like fingerprints in the clay and the stop-motion movements of the bosses. Walgren called the game "the prettiest [...] on Wii U so far," but was disappointed that the clay aesthetic did not influence the gameplay like the fabric did in Kirby's Epic Yarn. Creegan called it "astoundingly beautiful". However, a common point of criticism was the focus on the Wii U GamePad, who features a lower resolution, with critics citing the disappointment to not experience the HD to its fullest.

=== Sales ===
Nearly one month after its release in Japan, Kirby and the Rainbow Curse had sold roughly 58,000 units, with 83,000 copies sold by the end of June 2015.

== See also ==
- List of Kirby media
- List of Wii U games
- List of platformers
- 2015 in video games
