= Kirby (series) =

Multimedia franchise owned by HAL Laboratory

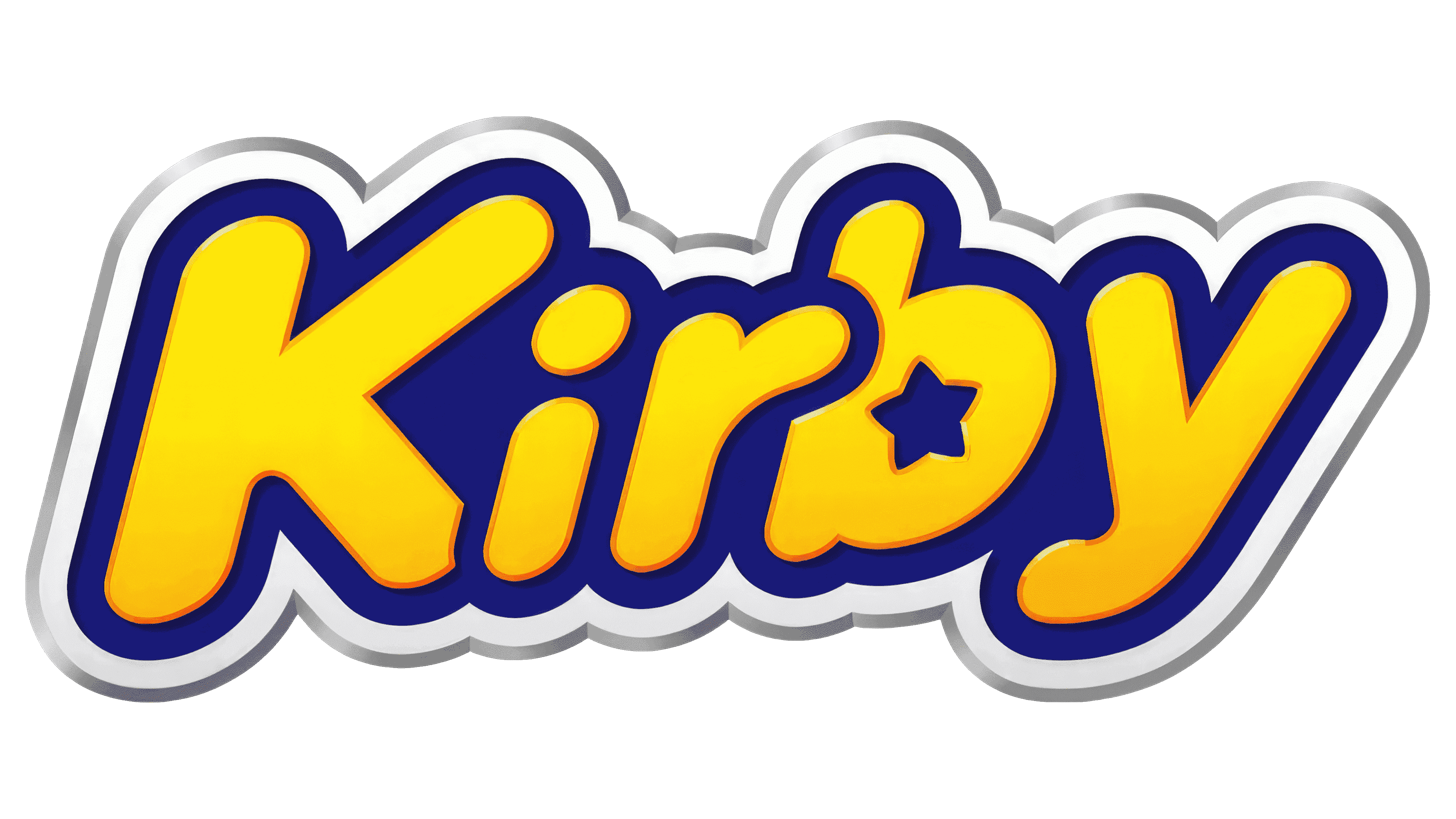
- Logo as of 2022
- Created by: Masahiro Sakurai
- Original work: Kirby's Dream Land
- Owners: HAL Laboratory; Nintendo
- Years: 1992–present

Print publications
- Comics: Kirby of the Stars: The Story of Dedede Who Lives in Pupupu

Films and television
- Animated series: Kirby: Right Back at Ya!

Games
- Video games: See List of Kirby media § Video games

Kirby (Note: Known in Japan as Hoshi no Kirby (星のカービィ, Hoshi no Kābī; lit. "Kirby of the Stars")) is a media franchise created by Japanese video game designer and director Masahiro Sakurai. The franchise revolves around the titular protagonist and his adventures on the fictional planet Popstar and beyond. The franchise is primarily developed by HAL Laboratory and published by Nintendo, with both companies jointly owning the property, although Nintendo fully owns the rights to make merchandise and the Kirby: Right Back at Ya! anime through its Nintendo Stars, Inc. subsidiary.

The franchise mainly consists of a video game series, which in turn mainly comprises platformers. The first game in the series, Kirby's Dream Land, was released in 1992. The second, Kirby's Adventure (1993), introduced Kirby's signature ability to copy enemy skills, allowing him to use them to progress through levels, distinguishing the series from other entries in the genre. The series also includes games in the puzzle and racing genres. Sakurai conceived the franchise as a game series for beginners, to which he partially attributes the series' success. Currently, the video game series contains thirty-nine games with over 50 million games sold worldwide, making it one of the best-selling video game franchises.

The franchise also includes an anime television series based on the video games, Kirby: Right Back at Ya!, which aired from 2001 to 2003 and also includes a special; and several manga series.

== Gameplay ==
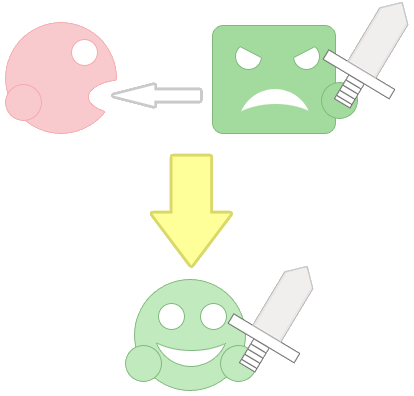
Kirby can gain the properties of enemies or objects he eats – for example, by inhaling a sword-wielding enemy, Kirby gains the Sword ability.

The main Kirby games are side-scrolling action platforms. As Kirby, the spherical pink protagonist, the player must run, jump, and attack enemies while traversing a number of areas, solving puzzles, and battling bosses along the way. Kirby possesses the ability to inhale objects and enemies, which he can spit out as a projectile or swallow. Some of these, when swallowed, will grant Kirby a Copy Ability, which allows him to take on a characteristic of that enemy and use it in combat. For example, upon swallowing an enemy that breathes fire, Kirby becomes able to breathe fire or swallowing an enemy with a sword Kirby can use a sword. Kirby can also take in air to inflate himself and fly. In most games, he can do this for as long as he wants, but his attack options become limited to an air bullet.

Kirby games often contain a number of hidden items that unlock more parts of the game or are simple incentives to collect, and are usually required to reach 100% in-game completion. These special items are usually related to the plot of the game, most often used to create a special weapon needed to defeat the final boss such as the rainbow sword. In some games, the special weapon is optional and can be used regularly after defeating the final boss with it. These elements have remained constant in most series, with each game having its own unique twist to affect gameplay.

There are also several spin-off games in the series, which involve a variety of different video game genres such as pinball, puzzle, racing, and motion-sensor-technology-based games.

== Characters ==
The series' main protagonist is Kirby, who resides in the kingdom of Dream Land on a five-point-star-shaped Planet Popstar. Much of Dream Land is peaceful, and its people lead laid-back, carefree lives. However, when the peace in Dream Land is shattered by threats both terrestrial and alien, it is up to Kirby to save his home and those who reside there.

Besides Kirby, many characters appear throughout the series as both allies and enemies, such as King Dedede, (Note: Japanese: デデデ大王, Hepburn: Dedede-daiō) a gluttonous bird-like creature resembling a blue penguin and self-proclaimed ruler of Dream Land. King Dedede debuted in the first game, Kirby's Dream Land, and his selfish nature or greater forces controlling him often lead him to clash with Kirby, but he mostly teams up with Kirby when a greater threat emerges, that is not controlling him, especially in the more recent games, where he is portrayed more so as a rival to Kirby as opposed to an enemy. King Dedede has appeared in all Kirby games except Kirby & the Amazing Mirror.

Another major character in the series is the enigmatic Meta Knight, a chivalrous masked creature similar in size and shape to Kirby who one day wishes to fight the strongest warrior in the galaxy and leads a group of like-minded warriors. Meta Knight has some kind of code of conduct which is why whenever he and Kirby fight, he will always offer Kirby a sword. While his unmasked face resembles Kirby's, his exact relationship with Kirby remains a mystery.

Popstar is home to a number of common creatures, the most notable of which are called Waddle Dees. They appear in some capacity in every Kirby game and are usually passive or aggressive towards the player, depending on the game. A certain Waddle Dee known as Bandana Waddle Dee, who wears a blue bandana and commonly wields a spear, is Kirby's best friend and occasionally assists him in his adventures, and appears as a playable character in some games.

One recurring boss in the series is some variant of Whispy Woods, a tree, and is often the first boss in the game and has appeared in other media as well.

== Development ==
Release timeline Main series entries in bold
| 1992 | **Dream Land** |
| 1993 | **Adventure** |
| 1993 | Pinball Land |
| 1994 | Dream Course |
| 1995 | Avalanche |
| 1995 | **Dream Land 2** |
| 1995 | Block Ball |
| 1996 | Toy Box |
| 1996 | **Super Star** |
| 1997 | Star Stacker (Game Boy) |
| 1997 | **Dream Land 3** |
| 1998 | Star Stacker (SNES) |
1999
| 2000 | **64: The Crystal Shards** |
| 2000 | Tilt 'n' Tumble |
2001
| 2002 | **Nightmare in Dream Land** |
| 2003 | Air Ride |
| 2004 | **Amazing Mirror** |
| 2005 | Canvas Curse |
| 2006 | **Squeak Squad** |
2007
| 2008 | **Super Star Ultra** |
2009
| 2010 | Epic Yarn |
| 2011 | Mass Attack |
| 2011 | **Return to Dream Land** |
| 2012 | Dream Collection |
2013
| 2014 | **Triple Deluxe** |
| 2014 | Fighters Deluxe |
| 2014 | Dedede's Drum Dash Deluxe |
| 2015 | Rainbow Curse |
| 2016 | **Planet Robobot** |
| 2017 | Team Kirby Clash Deluxe |
| 2017 | Blowout Blast |
| 2017 | Battle Royale |
| 2018 | **Star Allies** |
| 2019 | Extra Epic Yarn |
| 2019 | Super Kirby Clash |
| 2020 | Fighters 2 |
2021
| 2022 | **Forgotten Land** |
| 2022 | Dream Buffet |
| 2023 | **Return to Dream Land Deluxe** |
2024
| 2025 | **Star-Crossed World** |
| 2025 | Air Riders |
2026
| 2027 | **World Beyond** |

=== 1992–1999: Conception and first games ===
Kirby's Dream Land, released in 1992 for the Game Boy, was the first game in the series.

The Kirby franchise was conceived by Masahiro Sakurai in 1990. He drew a ball-shaped character as a prototype, but it was so well liked that it ended up becoming the final design. The character's name was originally Popopo during development, the game's title being Twinkle Popo, before Kirby's name was chosen as a tribute to the lawyer John Kirby. The first game in the Kirby series, Kirby's Dream Land for the original Game Boy, was released in Japan on April 27, 1992, and in North America, Europe and Australasia in August that year. A simple game, consisting of five levels, it introduced Kirby's ability to inhale enemies and objects, but lacked the power to obtain or use Copy Abilities. The game contains an unlockable hard mode, known as the "Extra Game", which features stronger enemies and more difficult bosses. Sakurai had intended for Kirby to have a pink coloration, but the monochrome color palette of the Game Boy made this unclear; Shigeru Miyamoto initially pictured Kirby as being yellow. While the game's Japanese box art showed Kirby with his correct pink color, the international box art featured a white Kirby, matching the in-game graphics.

The second game, Kirby's Adventure, was released in Japan on March 23, 1993, in North America on May 1, 1993, and Europe on September 12, 1993. Kirby's Adventure gave Kirby the ability to gain special powers when he ate certain enemies, called Copy Abilities; the game contained a total of 25 different ones to use. These powers replaced Kirby's inhale and could be used until Kirby sustained damage causing him to drop the ability, or the player voluntarily discarded it to obtain another one. The game firmly establishes Kirby's pink color, which was also translated to the international box art.

After Kirby's Adventure, the Kirby series received a number of spin-off games. Kirby's Pinball Land, released in November 1993 for the Game Boy, is a pinball game featuring Kirby as the pinball. Kirby's Dream Course, released in Japan on September 21, 1994, North America on February 1, 1995, and Europe on August 24, 1995, for the Super Nintendo Entertainment System, is a golf-based game which features an isometric graphic design. Kirby's Avalanche, released in Europe on February 1, 1995, and in North America on April 25, 1995, also for the Super Nintendo Entertainment System, is a puzzle game, a westernized version of the Japanese game Puyo Puyo.

Kirby's Dream Land 2, released in Japan on March 21, 1995, in North America on May 1, 1995, in Europe on July 31, 1995, and Australasia on November 22, 1995, for the Game Boy, brought the Copy Abilities from Kirby's Adventure to a handheld system, but due to system limitations lowered the number of abilities to seven. The game introduced three rideable animal companions: Rick the hamster, Coo the owl, and Kine the ocean sunfish. Pairing up with any of these three alters how Kirby's abilities work. It also introduced Dark Matter, a reoccurring antagonist in the Kirby series.

Kirby's Block Ball, released for the Game Boy on December 14, 1995, in Japan, on March 13, 1996, in North America and on August 29, 1996, in Europe, is a variation of the game Breakout, featuring multiple levels, some of Kirby's Copy Abilities, and various enemies in unique boss battles. In 1996, a Kirby minigame series, Kirby's Toy Box, (Note: Japanese: カービィのおもちゃ箱, Hepburn: Kābī no Omocha Bako) was released via the St.GIGA satellite broadcasting system for the Satellaview. These minigames were given a unique broadcast date. Minigames included Arrange Ball, Ball Rally, Baseball, Cannonball, Guru Guru Ball, Hoshi Kuzushi, Pachinko, and Pinball.

Kirby Super Star (also known as Hoshi no Kirby Super Deluxe in Japan and Kirby's Fun Pak in Europe) was released for the Super Nintendo Entertainment System in Japan on March 21, 1996, in North America on September 20, 1996, and in Europe on January 23, 1997. Kirby Super Star is composed of seven separate games and two sub-games, with four games in the beginning and three games that would be unlocked after beating certain games. It features several characters and abilities which have not appeared since in the series. The game features "Helpers", which can be created by sacrificing the ability in use, to help the player dispatch enemies.

Released for the Game Boy in 1997, Kirby's Star Stacker is a puzzle game which involves touching two or more similar blocks together that have Kirby's animal friends on them. The game received a sequel on the Super Nintendo Entertainment System in 1998 in Japan titled Kirby no Kirakira Kizzu (known in English as Kirby's Super Star Stacker). 26 years after its release, the game would be internationally via the Nintendo Switch Online service.

Kirby's Dream Land 3, released for the Super Nintendo Entertainment System on November 27, 1997, in North America and on March 27, 1998, in Japan, is a direct sequel to Kirby's Dream Land 2, as it featured the return of Kirby's animal friends. Similar to Kirby's Dream Land 2, Kirby's Dream Land 3 features a few Copy Abilities which were modified when Kirby paired up with one of his six animal friends. The game had a multiplayer option with the second player controlling Gooey, a recurring character. The antagonist is Dark Matter, and if certain conditions are met, Zero was fought as the true final boss. The game had a unique pastel-drawing art style and used dithering to improve visual performance.

There was also a planned game called Kid Kirby that was to be released on the Super Nintendo Entertainment System. The game would have served as a prequel to the series and would have utilized the SNES Mouse. The game was developed by DMA Design and was scheduled for release in 1995, but was canceled due to the declining sales of the mouse; however, early screenshots of the canceled game have been posted online.

=== 2000–2004: Introduction of 3D graphics and further spin-offs ===
Kirby 64: The Crystal Shards, released in 2000 for the Nintendo 64, introduced 3D graphics to the series, while retaining the classic 2D side-scrolling gameplay.

The first game to have 3D graphics in the Kirby series, Kirby 64: The Crystal Shards, was released on the Nintendo 64 in Japan on March 24, 2000, in North America on June 26, 2000, and in Europe on June 22, 2001. The game features a compound ability system that allows two of the seven abilities in the game to be combined, making a new compound ability. It also marked the first playable instance of King Dedede, where sections of some stages had Kirby riding piggyback while King Dedede attacked enemies and obstacles with his hammer. A Waddle Dee is also playable, by helping Kirby with certain sections in the game. It is considered a direct follow-up to Kirby's Dream Land 3 due to the reemergence of Dark Matter and the final boss, albeit in a different form, called 0^{2} (Zero Two). It also included three four-player minigames.

The next game in the Kirby series, Kirby Tilt 'n' Tumble became one of Nintendo's first motion-sensor-based games on August 23, 2000. Players are instructed to tilt the Game Boy Color to move Kirby on the screen. Quickly flicking the Game Boy Color upwards would make Kirby jump into the air. Tilt 'n' Tumble is the only Kirby game to have a special cartridge color (transparent pink) in North America. Kirby Tilt 'n' Tumble 2 on the GameCube, which was supposed to use a combination of motion-sensor technology and connectivity to the Game Boy Advance via the Nintendo GameCube Game Boy Advance Cable, was presented during Nintendo Space World 2001 and scheduled for a May 2002 release in Japan. The Kirby theme was eventually scrapped and Kirby was replaced with a generic marble, and the game was shown again at E3 2002 as Roll-O-Rama, but eventually canceled completely. Kirby Family was a Game Boy Color piece of software developed by Natsume Co., Ltd. that would connect to a compatible Jaguar JN-100 or JN-2000 sewing machine and embroider cloth with a Kirby pattern of choice. The game was also shown during Nintendo Space World 2001 and scheduled for release on September 10, 2001, but presumably canceled due to poor sales of Mario Family which released two weeks prior. The game was leaked on September 9, 2020, as part of the Game Boy Color lotcheck leak.

Kirby's Air Ride 64 (also known as Kirby Bowl 64 and Kirby Ball 64) on the Nintendo 64 was going to be a sequel to Kirby's Dream Course which featured an additional game mode where the player controlled Kirby on a snowboard. However, this was canceled for unknown reasons. Some of its concepts were later implemented into the only Kirby game for the GameCube, Kirby Air Ride, which was released in North America on October 13, 2003. Air Ride is a racing game which deviates greatly from other Kirby games, although still featuring series staples including enemies and Copy Abilities. After the release of Kirby Air Ride, the GameCube was going to have its own original Kirby game, simply titled Kirby for Nintendo GameCube at the time. It was nearly complete and featured at E3 2005, but was canceled due to troubles incorporating a unique multiplayer mechanic. At a later point, the game was concepted as a full 3D platformer visually similar to Kirby Air Ride, but also canceled because it did not achieve HAL Laboratory's quality standards.

In late 2002, Nintendo released Kirby: Nightmare in Dream Land, an enhanced remake of Kirby's Adventure for the Game Boy Advance (GBA) featuring updated graphics and sound, multiplayer support, and a new mode starring one of the game's bosses, Meta Knight.

During the 2003 Holiday season, a Kirby e-Reader card for the Game Boy Advance was released. The card was released under two names, Kirby Slide and Kirby Puzzle. Swiping the card would allow for a sliding puzzle game starring Kirby to be played. Cards were given out at Toys "R" Us stores and in the 2003 December issues of Nintendo Power and Tips & Tricks. The game was released to advertise the English dub of Kirby: Right Back at Ya!. The card would become incredibly rare, with all copies of the card believed to have been destroyed.

Kirby & the Amazing Mirror was released on October 18, 2004, on the Game Boy Advance. It is the second game released on that system, following Kirby: Nightmare in Dream Land. It features Kirby in a Metroidvania format, with all the levels being interconnected and able to be completed in any order. Also unique was the in-game phone, which can be used to summon up to three additional copies of Kirby to fight enemies and solve puzzles.

=== 2005–2011: Nintendo DS games and Kirby's Epic Yarn ===
Kirby: Canvas Curse, released in 2005 for the Nintendo DS, introduced touch-based gameplay to the series.

The next game in the series was Kirby: Canvas Curse, released on the Nintendo DS in Japan on March 24, 2005, North America on June 13, 2005, Europe on November 25, 2005, and Australia on April 6, 2006, under the name Kirby Power Paintbrush. Unlike most previous Kirby games, the player does not directly control Kirby with a directional pad, analog stick, face buttons, or shoulder buttons. Instead, Kirby is a helpless ball, and can only move when he gains momentum, the player painting paths with the stylus to direct his movement.

This was followed by Kirby: Squeak Squad (titled Kirby: Mouse Attack in Europe) in late 2006, also on the Nintendo DS, which revived traditional Kirby gameplay and dabbled in the use of the touch screen to store several items and Copy Abilities in Kirby's stomach. Ability scrolls could be found that served as upgrades for each ability, giving them additional moves and/or enhanced functionality. An unlockable Copy Ability was also introduced.

Kirby Super Star Ultra, announced for the Nintendo DS in early fall 2007 and released on September 22, 2008 in North America, is a remake of Kirby Super Star. In addition to the nine games from Kirby Super Star, seven new games have been added. The game features updated graphics, pre-rendered cutscenes, and all info on the bottom screen. The game is notable for being the first Kirby game to be directed by Shinya Kumazaki, who would go on to become the general director for the series. Kirby's Epic Yarn was announced for the Wii at E3 2010 and released in North America on October 17, 2010. Epic Yarn began development as an original game by Good-Feel called Fluff of Yarn, but was given the Kirby license at Nintendo's proposal.

A fourth game for the Nintendo DS was released in North America on September 19, 2011, Kirby Mass Attack. The game features multiple copies of Kirby in touch screen-based gameplay reminiscent of games such as Lemmings. Unfortunately, Mass Attack would become one of the worst selling Kirby games of all-time due to being very late for the DS' release.

=== 2011–2021: Evolution of 2.5D platforming ===
Kirby's Return to Dream Land, released in 2011 for the Wii, returned traditional platforming gameplay to the series – the first in a home console since Kirby 64: The Crystal Shards (2000) – featuring local multiplayer up to 4 players.

Kirby's Return to Dream Land (titled Kirby's Adventure Wii in PAL regions) was released on the Wii in North America on October 24, 2011, returning to the traditional Kirby gameplay and allowing up to four players to play simultaneously. Players 2–4 could choose to play as Meta Knight, King Dedede and/or Bandana Waddle Dee, each with dedicated abilities; they could also play as different-colored Kirbys which offered power copying abilities, or as a mixture of the options. The unique multiplayer mechanic originally to be incorporated in the first GameCube build became the special attack in Return to Dream Land (where all players stack on each other, hold A and release at the same time).

An anthology disc for the Wii called Kirby's Dream Collection was released on July 19, 2012, in Japan and on September 16, 2012, in North America to celebrate Kirby's 20th Anniversary. It includes six games from the early history of the series, which are Kirby's Dream Land, Kirby's Adventure, Kirby's Dream Land 2, Kirby Super Star, Kirby's Dream Land 3, and Kirby 64: The Crystal Shards. It also has new Challenge Stages that run on the engine of Kirby's Return to Dream Land (titled Kirby's Adventure Wii in PAL regions), and a Kirby history section, which includes three episodes from Hoshi no Kirby (Kirby: Right Back at Ya! in North America). Similar to the Super Mario 25th Anniversary packaging in 2010, a booklet and a soundtrack containing music from the various games in the series are released alongside the disc.

On October 1, 2013, during a Nintendo Direct presentation, a new untitled original Kirby game for the Nintendo 3DS was announced, later named Kirby: Triple Deluxe. The game was released in Japan on January 11, 2014, in North America on May 2, 2014, in Europe on May 16, 2014, and in Australasia on May 17, 2014. It incorporated action spanning varied depths, where Kirby could swap between the foreground and background areas. It included a multiplayer fighting minigame called Kirby Fighters, where players could choose one of ten available abilities and fight on themed stages, with the winner being the last Kirby standing. It also included a rhythm-based action minigame starring King Dedede titled Dedede's Drum Dash. There were also over 250 in-game "keychains" to collect that featured sprites from previous Kirby games as well some original sprites based on characters from Triple Deluxe.

In August 2014, Kirby Fighters Deluxe and Dedede's Drum Dash Deluxe (enhanced versions of the minigames in Kirby: Triple Deluxe) were released. At E3 2014, a new game for the Wii U was announced. Titled Kirby and the Rainbow Curse in North America and Kirby and the Rainbow Paintbrush in PAL regions, the game is a sequel/successor to Kirby: Canvas Curse and features a similar gameplay style. It was released by Nintendo on January 22, 2015, in Japan, February 20, 2015, in North America, May 8, 2015, in Europe and May 9, 2015, in Australasia.

On March 3, 2016, during a Nintendo Direct presentation, Nintendo unveiled a new game based on the context of Kirby: Triple Deluxe called Kirby: Planet Robobot, the second Kirby game released on the Nintendo 3DS. It was released alongside a set of Amiibo figures made for the Kirby franchise, including a newly announced Amiibo, Waddle Dee, on April 28, 2016, in Japan, June 10, 2016, in North America and Europe, and June 11, 2016, in Australasia. The game is compatible with other Amiibo. It also includes 2 new minigames, called Kirby 3D Rumble and Team Kirby Clash, the former being an arena based, 3D action game where Kirby uses his inhale to defeat large groups of baddies to rack up points and achieve a high score, and the latter being a mix of fighting, platform, and role-playing. Players can level up to level 10, and can play with AI or other friends.

In a Nintendo Direct presentation on April 12, 2017, three new Kirby games were announced for Kirby's 25th Anniversary which were released the same year: Team Kirby Clash Deluxe, an enhanced version of the Kirby: Planet Robobot minigame Team Kirby Clash; Kirby's Blowout Blast, an 3D action-strategy game and an enhanced version of the Kirby: Planet Robobot minigame Kirby 3D Rumble; and Kirby Battle Royale, an action-multiplayer fighting game.

At E3 2017, Nintendo unveiled a new untitled original installment for the Nintendo Switch, later named Kirby Star Allies. The game was released on March 16, 2018. Kirby can throw Friend Hearts to turn enemies into computer- or player-controlled allies, a variation of the "Helper System" from Kirby Super Star. "Power Combinations" return from Kirby 64: The Crystal Shards and Kirby: Squeak Squad. Kirby can also summon "Dream Friends", consisting of major Kirby characters acting as Helpers, which includes King Dedede, Meta Knight, and Bandana Waddle Dee.

On March 8, 2019, Epic Yarn got a remake/port on the Nintendo 3DS entitled Kirby's Extra Epic Yarn. On September 4, 2019, Nintendo released a new Nintendo Switch game, Super Kirby Clash, on the Nintendo eShop, as the successor to Team Kirby Clash Deluxe. The game expands on the previous installment with new quests. On September 23, 2020, Nintendo released a new Nintendo Switch game, Kirby Fighters 2, on the Nintendo eShop, as the successor to Kirby Fighters Deluxe. Before its official reveal, the game was leaked on the Play Nintendo website, but was later taken down. The game expands on the previous installment with new game modes and an exclusive ability, Wrestler.

=== 2022–present: Introduction of 3D gameplay ===
During the Nintendo Direct event held on September 23, 2021, a new Nintendo Switch title in the Kirby series was revealed, titled Kirby and the Forgotten Land. It is the first true 3D entry in the mainline series (fourth overall since the spin-offs Kirby Air Ride, Kirby's Blowout Blast, and Kirby Battle Royale) and was released on March 25, 2022, becoming the highest-selling game in the series. The game was co-developed with Japanese video game company Vanpool. The Forgotten Land is the first Kirby game to feature the new logo, which was introduced in 2022.

On July 12, 2022, a new Nintendo Switch title in the Kirby series was announced, titled Kirby's Dream Buffet. It is a multiplayer party game, and was released on the Nintendo eShop on August 17, 2022. A remake of Kirby's Return to Dream Land for the Nintendo Switch, titled Kirby's Return to Dream Land Deluxe was revealed during the Nintendo Direct event held on September 13, 2022, and was released on February 24, 2023. It features new abilities, modes, and a graphical style similar to a comic book. This was the last game Vanpool, who co-developed most Kirby games since Super Kirby Clash, worked on before shutting down on May 31, 2023.

In the Nintendo Switch 2 Direct on April 2, 2025, two new Kirby games were announced to release that year. The first was an enhanced port of Kirby and the Forgotten Land with higher frame rates and a new game mode, Star-Crossed World. The second was a sequel to Kirby Air Ride, dubbed Kirby Air Riders. Masahiro Sakurai directed the game, marking his return to the franchise after Kirby & the Amazing Mirror in 2004.

In a Nintendo Direct on September 9, 2026, Nintendo announced Kirby and the World Beyond, the second 3D platformer in the main series, which is planned to release in Q2 2027 for the Nintendo Switch 2.

== Reception ==
Sales and aggregate review scores As of November 6, 2025.
| Game | Year | Units sold (in millions) | GameRankings | Metacritic (out of 100) | OpenCritic |
|---|---|---|---|---|---|
| Kirby's Dream Land | 1992 | 5.13 | 62% | — | — |
| Kirby's Adventure | 1993 | 1.75 | 84% | — | — |
| Kirby's Pinball Land | 1993 | 2.19 | 70% | — | — |
| Kirby's Dream Course | 1994 | < 1 | 77% | — | — |
| Kirby's Avalanche | 1995 | < 1 | 74% | — | — |
| Kirby's Dream Land 2 | 1995 | 2.36 | 82% | — | — |
| Kirby's Block Ball | 1995 | < 1 | 73% | — | — |
| Kirby Super Star | 1996 | 1.44 | 85% | — | — |
| Kirby's Star Stacker | 1997 | < 1 | 73% | — | — |
| Kirby's Dream Land 3 | 1997 | < 1 | 66% | — | — |
| Kirby 64: The Crystal Shards | 2000 | 1.77 | 74% | 77 | — |
| Kirby Tilt 'n' Tumble | 2000 | 1.23 | 82% | — | — |
| Kirby: Nightmare in Dream Land | 2002 | 2.1 | 80% | 81 | — |
| Kirby Air Ride | 2003 | 1.35 | 66% | 61 | — |
| Kirby & the Amazing Mirror | 2004 | 1.47 | 77% | 80 | — |
| Kirby: Canvas Curse | 2005 | < 1 | 87% | 86 | — |
| Kirby: Squeak Squad | 2006 | 2.27 | 72% | 71 | — |
| Kirby Super Star Ultra | 2008 | 2.99 | 79% | 76 | — |
| Kirby's Epic Yarn | 2010 | 1.85 | 88% | 86 | — |
| Kirby Mass Attack | 2011 | 1.22 | 84% | 83 | — |
| Kirby's Return to Dream Land | 2011 | 1.79 | 80% | 77 | — |
| 3D Classics: Kirby's Adventure | 2011 | < 1 | 78% | 77 | — |
| Kirby's Dream Collection | 2012 | < 1 | 81% | 82 | — |
| Kirby: Triple Deluxe | 2014 | 2.66 | 80% | 80 | 75% recommend |
| Kirby Fighters Deluxe | 2014 | < 1 | 65% | 66 | — |
| Dedede's Drum Dash Deluxe | 2014 | < 1 | 63% | 65 | — |
| Kirby and the Rainbow Curse | 2015 | < 1 | 75% | 73 | 54% recommend |
| Kirby: Planet Robobot | 2016 | 1.64 | 83% | 81 | 86% recommend |
| Team Kirby Clash Deluxe | 2017 | < 1 | — | 57 | — |
| Kirby's Blowout Blast | 2017 | < 1 | 71% | 69 | 13% recommend |
| Kirby Battle Royale | 2017 | < 1 | 58% | 57 | 3% recommend |
| Kirby Star Allies | 2018 | 4.38 | 73% | 73 | 54% recommend |
| Kirby's Extra Epic Yarn | 2019 | < 1 | 80% | 79 | 72% recommend |
| Super Kirby Clash | 2019 | < 1 | 76% | 74 | — |
| Kirby Fighters 2 | 2020 | < 1 | — | 65 | 34% recommend |
| Kirby and the Forgotten Land | 2022 | 7.52 | — | 85 | 94% recommend |
| Kirby's Dream Buffet | 2022 | < 1 | — | 66 | 29% recommend |
| Kirby's Return to Dream Land Deluxe | 2023 | 1.46 | — | 79 | 79% recommend |

The Kirby games have received reception that ranges from mixed to very favorable reviews by players and critics. According to Metacritic reviews: Kirby: Canvas Curse and Kirby's Epic Yarn are the most acclaimed games in the series, while Kirby Battle Royale and Team Kirby Clash Deluxe are the lowest-rated. Kirby and the Forgotten Land and Kirby: Squeak Squad are respectively the highest-rated and the lowest-rated mainline series games.

=== Sales ===
Many Kirby games have performed commercially well, selling at least one million or more copies worldwide. Kirby's Dream Land, the first title in the series, had been its best-selling game at 5 million copies until it was overtaken by Kirby and the Forgotten Land thirty years into the series, with it selling 7.5 million copies. Kirby's Dream Land 3 would become the worst selling mainline Kirby game at just 76 thousand copies sold only in Japan, as international sales information for games that have sold less than one million copies is unavailable.

The Kirby manga would have over 10 million copies in print in 2023.

As a brand, the series sold $150 million to $200 million worth of merchandise in 2002.

== Legacy ==
=== Crossovers ===
Left to right: Meta Knight, King Dedede and Kirby in Super Smash Bros. Brawl

The Kirby franchise is represented in the crossover fighting game series Super Smash Bros., whose first three games were developed by Kirby owner HAL Laboratory, with Kirby appearing in all installments of the franchise; Meta Knight and King Dedede have also appeared in every entry since Super Smash Bros. Brawl. Many items from the Kirby series also appear in Super Smash Bros. such as the Maxim Tomato (all games), Warp Star (since Melee), Dragoon (since Brawl) and Star Rod (all games) as items, and Knuckle Joe (since Brawl), Nightmare (since 3DS/Wii U) and Chef Kawasaki (Ultimate) appear as characters summoned by the Assist Trophy. All playable Kirby characters in Smash Bros. have the ability to jump more than twice. Kirby has also made cameo appearances in other games as well, such as The Legend of Zelda: Link's Awakening, EarthBound, Mario & Luigi: Superstar Saga and Stunt Race FX, Arcana, Pokémon Stadium. The two Kirby Amiibo figures, one based on the Super Smash Bros. series and the other made for the Kirby franchise are compatible with Mario Kart 8 where they can be scanned to unlock a costume for the player's Mii based on his appearance, and Super Mario Maker where they can be scanned to unlock a Kirby costume.

=== Kirby Café ===
In 2016, "Kirby Café" was unveiled as a restaurant chain in Japan themed around Kirby with two permanent locations, one in Sumina in the Solamachi entertainment complex, and the other within Hakata-ku in the Canal City Hakata entertainment complex. Kirby Café has had a number of temporary locations which have run continuously since August 2016.

=== Other media ===
==== Anime ====
The Kirby games were the basis for a Japanese animated TV series which premiered in Japan on October 6, 2001, where it was titled simply Hoshi no Kirby. It was produced by Warpstar, Inc., a company formed from a joint investment between Nintendo and HAL Laboratory, Inc. It was licensed in North America by 4Kids Entertainment, under the title Kirby: Right Back at Ya!, on 4Kids TV, with VHS and DVD distribution in North America by FUNimation Entertainment and DVD distribution in Australia by Magna Pacific. It ended in Japan in 2003 with 100 episodes.

The show is about the adventures Kirby has with his friends Tiff (Note: Also known as "Fumu" in Japan) and Tuff (Note: Also known as "Bun" in Japan) after he crash lands in Dream Land (this is known as "Pupu Village" in the Japanese version and "Cappy Town" in the English dub), on Planet Popstar. Here, he is a legendary Star Warrior destined to save the universe from the intergalactic conqueror known as Nightmare. However, because he was awakened two centuries too early, he arrived in a childlike state and his powers have not fully developed. The ruler of Dream Land, King Dedede, is jealous of the attention Kirby receives from its inhabitants and frequently orders monsters from Nightmare's company, Nightmare Enterprises, in an attempt to do away with Kirby. Nightmare Enterprises at first appears to be an intergalactic delivery company, but is really a front for Nightmare's intergalactic conquest that dupes unsuspecting customers into funding Nightmare's armies. Not yet ready to achieve his destiny, Kirby must learn how to use his incredible abilities with the help of his friends and sometimes with the help of the enigmatic Meta Knight, who, while claiming to be loyal to King Dedede, will often work behind the scenes in order to aid Kirby or train him in the use of his abilities.

The series is based on the game series, but rather than being a direct adaptation of any of the games it uses characters and concepts from the games (especially Kirby's Dream Land, Kirby's Adventure and Kirby Super Star) to tell its own story.

==== Comics, manga and novels ====
Kirby stars in several manga series that have been drawn by over 20 manga artists.

The longest running Kirby manga, Kirby of the Stars: The Story of Dedede Who Lives in Pupupu, was serialized in CoroCoro Comic from 1994 to 2006, and released 25 tankōbon volumes with over 10 million copies being printed. The series was written and illustrated by Hirokazu Hikawa. The series was later published as a "best-of" collection, which featured the series' first new chapter in 11 years, as well as bonus comics. It was published in English as Kirby Manga Mania by Viz Media. Originally, Viz had plans to localize The Story of Dedede Who Lives In Pupupu for North America in 2009, For unknown reasons, these plans were quietly abandoned by 2011.

An ongoing series of novels based upon the Kirby series have been published by Kadokawa Tsubasa Bunko since 2013. They are written by Mie Takase and illustrated by Tau and Poto Karino.
