= Kirby Fighters 2 =

2020 video game

- Game icon
- Developers: HAL Laboratory; Vanpool
- Publisher: Nintendo
- Directors: Shinya Kumazaki; Tadashi Kawai; Yumi Todo; Jun Taniguchi
- Producers: Tadashi Kamitake; Jun Tsuda; Toyokazu Nonaka; Akira Kinashi
- Designer: Natsuki Tsuji
- Programmer: Yohei Fukuda
- Composers: Kiyoshi Hazemoto; Hirokazu Ando; Yuki Shimooka; Jun Ishikawa
- Series: Kirby
- Platform: Nintendo Switch
- Release: September 23, 2020
- Genre: Fighting game
- Modes: Single-player, multiplayer

Kirby Fighters 2 is a 2020 fighting game for the Nintendo Switch and is the direct sequel to Kirby Fighters Deluxe. Developed by HAL Laboratory and Vanpool and published by Nintendo, the game features characters and assets from the Kirby franchise and uses the Super Kirby Clash game engine. The game released worldwide in September 2020, but was accidentally leaked prior on the Play Nintendo website.

== Gameplay ==
Kirby Fighters 2 is a platform fighting game for up to four players on either the same console or online/local play. The game is based on combat mechanics common to the Kirby series. Each player can choose an ability based on copy abilities from prior Kirby games, as well as a new ability called Wrestler Kirby, and each comes with a different moveset. While most characters are different variants of Kirby, additional characters such as King Dedede and Meta Knight are playable as well.

The game's story mode, titled The Destined Rivals, is divided into five chapters where the player must fight a series of consecutive CPU-controlled enemy Kirby with randomized copy abilities alongside another player or a computer-controlled ally. The latter three chapters culminate in a battle against King Dedede and Meta Knight. The game mode features roguelike elements, with the player given a choice between upgrades after each battle. In the final chapter, if the player's team loses three times, they must restart the chapter.

Other game modes include Single-Handed Mode, which is played in the same format as Kirby Fighters Deluxe's Single Player Mode, Battle Mode, where up to four players participate in a single battle, Online Mode, Local Play Mode, and Training.

== Development and release ==
Kirby Fighters 2 was developed by HAL Laboratory and Vanpool, and published by Nintendo, using the Super Kirby Clash game engine. The game released worldwide on September 23, 2020, on the Nintendo eShop, six years after the previous title, Kirby Fighters Deluxe. Shortly after, the game received a free demo. Although the game was released in September, the game was accidentally showcased on the Play Nintendo website as a downloadable title prior to release.

Game developer Tadashi Kawai created a blog post describing the development process of Kirby Fighters 2. He wrote how the "single-player mode evolved from the idea that "this is a multiplayer game, but I want to develop a mode that is fun, even when playing alone". He also described the game's development during the COVID-19 pandemic in Japan, when all developers were remote workers.

== Reception ==
Reception

Aggregate scores
Aggregator	Score
Metacritic	65/100
OpenCritic	36% recommend

Review scores
Publication	Score
Destructoid	6/10
GameSpot	6/10
Nintendo Life	8/10
Nintendo World Report	6.5/10
Shacknews	5/10

The game was met by "mixed or average" reviews, according to the review aggregator Metacritic. Fellow review aggregator OpenCritic assessed that the game received fair approval, being recommended by 36% of critics. Polygon summarized Kirby Fighters 2 as "curious, cute, and lacking much definition, just like its namesake character".

== See also ==
- List of Kirby media
- List of Nintendo Switch games
- List of fighting games
- 2020 in video games
