= Kirby: Triple Deluxe =

2014 video game

- Packaging artwork
- Developer: HAL Laboratory
- Publisher: Nintendo
- Director: Shinya Kumazaki
- Producers: Hiroaki Suga; Hitoshi Yamagami
- Designer: Yuki Endo
- Programmer: Yoshihiro Nagata
- Artist: Tadashi Kamitake
- Composers: Hirokazu Ando; Jun Ishikawa
- Series: Kirby
- Platform: Nintendo 3DS
- Release: JP: January 11, 2014; KO: April 17, 2014; NA: May 2, 2014; EU: May 16, 2014; AU: May 17, 2014
- Genre: Platform
- Modes: Single-player, multiplayer

Kirby: Triple Deluxe (Note: Known in Japan as Hoshi no Kirby Triple Deluxe (星のカービィ トリプルデラックス, Hoshi no Kābī Toripuru Derakkusu; lit. Kirby of the Stars: Triple Deluxe)) is a 2014 platform game developed by HAL Laboratory and published by Nintendo for the Nintendo 3DS. It is the tenth main installment of the Kirby series. The game was released in Japan on January 11, 2014, and in other regions in May. The game follows Kirby as he embarks on a journey through six worlds to rescue King Dedede from Taranza.

It received generally positive reviews upon its release. Praise went to the level design, the new Hypernova ability, soundtrack, graphics, use of 3D, and extra content. However, it received some criticism for its low difficulty level. Kirby: Triple Deluxe was succeeded by Kirby: Planet Robobot for the 3DS in 2016.

== Gameplay ==
Kirby: Triple Deluxe is a platformer displayed in a 2.5D perspective. Some enemy attacks also emanate from the background. Kirby can eat a rainbow-colored Miracle Fruit to become Hypernova Kirby, which allows him to inhale extremely large objects. Bandana Waddle Dee also throws Assist Stars at Kirby, which, by pressing the Y button, can heal Kirby.

New copy abilities include Beetle, which allows Kirby to use a Japanese rhinoceros beetle's horn to impale enemies, slam them on the ground, or carry them around; Bell, which lets Kirby wield twin bells, use them as a shield, and attack with sound waves; Archer, which lets Kirby fire arrows and use fake trees and boulders to avoid enemy attacks; and Circus, which allows Kirby to ride on a giant rolling ball to bowl over enemies, juggle flaming bowling pins to attack enemies above him and use exploding balloon animals as weapons. At least 20 copy abilities from previous games return, including Wheel, which was absent from Kirby's Return to Dream Land.

Two new subgames are Kirby Fighters, a Super Smash Bros.-style fighting game where the player can customize their own Kirby and give him one of ten copy abilities to battle other Kirbys in stages based on levels from previous Kirby games; and Dedede's Drum Dash, a rhythm game starring King Dedede, who jumps on drums while avoiding enemies and collecting coins to the tune of classic Kirby songs. The main game is single player only. Players can also find and collect keychains which depict characters from previous Kirby games.

After the main story mode is completed, players unlock an extra mode called Dededetour!, featuring King Dedede as the playable character. In this mode, all of the bosses are replaced by their "DX" counterparts, who sport different color schemes, are more powerful, and have new attacks. At the end of this mode, Dedede fights Shadow Dedede and Dark Meta Knight, who are King Dedede's and Meta Knight's evil clones from the Mirror World.

== Plot ==
After a relaxing day, Kirby heads home for a good night's rest. While he is sleeping, a large seed falls from the clouds and lands nearby, creating the Dreamstalk that lifts Kirby's house in the air. In the morning, a shocked Kirby heads to Castle Dedede, which has also been lifted by the vines. Once he reaches the gates, however, Kirby notices an arachnid-like being named Taranza entering the castle. Effortlessly, Taranza takes out the Waddle Dee guards and kidnaps a surprised King Dedede, carrying him up the Dreamstalk. Kirby gives chase, fighting Taranza's minions along the way. After following Taranza throughout multiple regions, the adventure reaches its conclusion in Royal Road, the capital city of Floralia, the kingdom in the sky.

When Kirby finally reaches Taranza, he attacks Kirby using a hypnotized King Dedede. After an intense fight, Kirby defeats the king and frees him of the hypnosis. Taranza reveals that he has been working for Floralia's self-proclaimed Queen, the vespid-being Queen Sectonia and that the Floralians planted the Dreamstalk in the hopes of summoning Dream Land's hero to their aid. Mistakenly believing King Dedede to be that hero, Taranza kidnapped him on the orders of Queen Sectonia, who wants to use the Dreamstalk to take over Dream Land. Queen Sectonia scolds Taranza for his failure, blasting at him with her staff causing him to fly away from the tower before turning her sights on Kirby.

Kirby faces Queen Sectonia and wins. Kirby and Dedede celebrate, but Sectonia merges with the Dreamstalk and turns into a giant flower-like monster. She begins to spread vines all over Popstar, ripping out pieces of land for her kingdom and preventing anyone from getting close enough to attack her. With Dedede's help, Kirby manages to get through Sectonia's vines and confronts her once more.

After a hard battle, Kirby eventually defeats Queen Sectonia, but Sectonia grabs Kirby with her vines and tries to crush him while Kirby cries for help. King Dedede and Taranza (with a change of heart) come to Kirby's rescue, freeing him and giving him a Miracle Fruit to finally defeat the queen. Kirby finishes off Queen Sectonia by inhaling her giant laser blast and spitting it back out at her, destroying her. With Floralia rescued, Kirby is ferried back home by the People of the Sky, and the Dreamstalk is purified, fully blooming, and becoming a permanent fixture of Dream Land.

=== Optional scenes ===
At the end of Dededetour!, an extra mode featuring King Dedede as the protagonist, King Dedede encounters a clone of himself from another dimension, Shadow Dedede. After the real Dedede beats the shadowy clone, he encounters Dark Meta Knight, who has come back for revenge. Dedede, however, defeats him, sending him back into the mirror he came from. He then uses his hammer to destroy the mirror.

At the end of The True Arena, a boss rush that is unlocked by beating the game, Queen Sectonia uses the Miracle Fruits to revive herself. Kirby then fights Soul of Sectonia, a harder version of Queen Sectonia with brand new attacks. Defeating her first form makes her rip herself out of the Dreamstalk for the final (bonus) boss of the game. She is capable of many new attacks, some of which reference previous Kirby final bosses such as Marx Soul and Drawcia Soul. Upon her final defeat, Queen Sectonia explodes in a flurry of blue petals, as a single large, sparkling blue petal is seen drifting down the screen.

== Development ==
The game was announced on October 1, 2013, during a Nintendo Direct presentation. However, the title of the game was not actually revealed until over a month later, when it was mentioned in a recap email sent by Nintendo after that November's direct. The game's title originated from "3DX", due to developers wanting to incorporate the letter X due to the game being the 10th main installment in the Kirby series, as well as reflect the capabilities of the Nintendo 3DS. The game's release in Australia was accompanied by the launch of a pink Nintendo 2DS.

Enhanced versions of the two minigames featured in the main game, titled Kirby Fighters Z and Dedede's Drum Rush Z (or Kirby Fighters Deluxe and Dedede's Drum Dash Deluxe outside Japan), were released as standalone titles downloadable from the Nintendo eShop on July 23, 2014, in Japan, August 29, 2014, in North America, and February 13, 2015, in Europe. These versions feature new stages and gameplay features, with additional content unlocked if saved data from Kirby: Triple Deluxe is detected.

Kirby Fighters Deluxe would later a receive a follow-up on the Nintendo Switch in September 2020, titled Kirby Fighters 2, using the Kirby Star Allies engine. It features more content, online play, more copy abilities (including the new "Wrestler" ability), and playable characters besides Kirby.

== Reception ==
=== Critical response ===
Reception

Aggregate scores
Aggregator	Score
GameRankings	80.62%
Metacritic	80/100
OpenCritic	75% recommend

Review scores
Publication	Score
Destructoid	8/10
Digital Trends	4.5/5
Edge	7/10
Electronic Gaming Monthly	9/10
Eurogamer	8/10
Famitsu	35/40
Game Informer	8.5/10
GameSpot	8/10
GamesRadar+	3.5/5
IGN	6/10
Nintendo Life	7/10
Nintendo World Report	8/10; 8.5/10
Official Nintendo Magazine	87%
PCMag	4/5
Polygon	7.5/10
The Guardian	4/5
Hardcore Gamer	4/5
USGamer	4/5

The game received positive reviews, holding an average of 80 on Metacritic based on 68 reviews and an 80.62% on GameRankings. In Japan, four critics from Famitsu gave the game a total score of 35 out of 40. GameSpot awarded the game an 8 out 10, praising the level design, graphics, soundtrack, use of 3D, controls, and lasting appeal. Polygon gave it a 7.5 out of 10, praising its innovative level design but criticizing the overall aesthetics as "simple" and "drab" in comparison to earlier games. Hardcore Gamer gave the game a 4 out of 5 calling it a "one of the best handheld iterations in the beloved Nintendo franchise."

However, IGN's Jose Otero gave it a 6 out of 10, praising its boss battles and use of the 3D, but strongly criticizing its low difficulty. He stated, "Kirby Triple Deluxe may look great and has some clever ideas for how to use 3D, but falls into a rut of simple platforming and puzzles that rarely require any thought or skill. I admire that it tries to give us more powers and abilities to play with than ever before, but that empowerment shouldn't come at the expense of any real difficulty."

=== Sales ===
As of March 2015, the game has sold 1.78 million units worldwide. As of December 31, 2022, Kirby's Triple Deluxe had sold 2.66 million copies worldwide, making it the 27th best-selling game for the Nintendo 3DS.
