= Dedede's Drum Dash Deluxe =

- Cover art
- Developer: HAL Laboratory
- Publisher: Nintendo
- Director: Shinya Kumazaki
- Series: Kirby
- Platform: Nintendo 3DS
- Release: JP: July 23, 2014; NA: August 29, 2014; KO: September 24, 2014; EU: February 13, 2015; AU: February 13, 2015
- Genre: Rhythm
- Mode: Single-player

Dedede's Drum Dash Deluxe (Note: Japanese: デデデ大王のデデデでデンZ, Hepburn: Dedede Daiō no Dedede de Den Z); lit. "King Dedede's Dedede-Drumming Z") is a rhythm game developed by HAL Laboratory and published by Nintendo on the Nintendo 3DS eShop. It was released internationally with a Japanese release on July 23, 2014, a North American release on August 29, 2014, a Korean release on September 24, 2014, and an European and Australian release on February 13, 2015. It functions as an expanded version of the Dedede's Drum Dash minigame in Kirby: Triple Deluxe with more levels and features.

The game lets the player control King Dedede, a prominent character in the Kirby series, through stages where the player must bounce on drums and press buttons to the beat of songs from Kirby games. Due to the closure of the Nintendo eShop on the 3DS in March 2023, the game can no longer be purchased.

== Gameplay ==
The game has 14 stages where the player has to move forward to the end of the level while trying to stay on beat with the song that is playing. King Dedede bounces on drums and the player must control his movement between them and the height of his jumps in order to avoid obstacles, enemies or to get coins. The player must also press 'A' on every back beat in order to gain points. At the end of each stage the player is awarded a medal based on the points they earned from the accuracy of their timings and movements varying from bronze, silver, gold, and platinum. There is also a trophy ranking for the games normal and special levels that is based on cumulative scores.

Upon starting the game the first level is available to play, and after beating it levels 2–6 are unlocked. once all of these first six levels have been beaten an extra stage is unlocked. Once a gold trophy is achieved the first special stage is unlocked. Special stages have the same songs with a higher difficulty. after the first special stage is beaten special stages 2–6 are unlocked, and once a gold medal is achieved on all normal and special stages the special extra stage is unlocked.

The game also allows the player to unlock masks for Dedede to wear that change his voice. the metal mask and Taranza mask are awarded for completing all normal stages and special stages respectively. The Waddle Dee, Kirby, and Meta Knight masks require having StreetPass data for Kirby: Triple Deluxe.

== Reception ==
Reception

Aggregate score
| Aggregator | Score |
|---|---|
| Metacritic | 65/100 |

Review scores
| Publication | Score |
|---|---|
| Nintendo Life | 9/10 |
| Nintendo World Report | 7.5/10 |
| The Guardian | 2/5 |

Dedede's Drum Dash Deluxe received "mixed or average" reviews from critics, according to the review aggregation website Metacritic.

Some critics praised the game's controls and charm, while others criticized the lack of content.

== See also ==
- List of Kirby media
- 2014 in video games
