= Kirby's Blowout Blast =

2017 video game

- Developer: HAL Laboratory
- Publisher: Nintendo
- Director: Tatsuya Kamiyama
- Producers: Satoshi Mitsuhara; Hitoshi Yamagami
- Designer: Yutaka Watanabe
- Programmer: Hiroshi Ohnishi
- Composers: Hirokazu Ando; Jun Ishikawa
- Series: Kirby
- Platform: Nintendo 3DS
- Release: JP: July 4, 2017; WW: July 6, 2017
- Genre: Action platformer
- Mode: Single-player

Kirby's Blowout Blast is a 2017 video game in the Kirby series for the Nintendo 3DS. It is an expanded version of the Kirby 3D Rumble minigame in Kirby: Planet Robobot (2016). It has been compared to Kirby's Dream Land (1992) due to containing the same levels by name and a lack of copy abilities. The game was praised by reviewers for its replayability, but criticized for being too repetitive. Due to the closure of the Nintendo eShop on the 3DS, the game can no longer be purchased, alongside the three other spin offs released for the system.

== Gameplay ==
Kirby's Blowout Blast does not feature Copy Abilities, with the player character, Kirby, only being able to jump and inhale. Gameplay revolves around Kirby inhaling objects and enemies, and spitting them out as projectiles. Killing enemies with those two abilities starts a combo, earning the player points. If the player gets a high enough high score on each level in a world, they will unlock more challenging versions of each of those levels called EX stages. After all EX levels have been completed a "secret path" stage acts as a final challenge.

== Development and release ==
Kirby's Blowout Blast is an expanded version of the Kirby 3D Rumble minigame in Kirby: Planet Robobot. The game released for the Nintendo 3DS on July 6, 2017, after the release of the Nintendo Switch. It was announced in a Nintendo Direct alongside Team Kirby Clash Deluxe, which released in April 2017.

== Reception ==
Reception

Aggregate scores
| Aggregator | Score |
|---|---|
| Metacritic | 69/100 |
| OpenCritic | 13% recommend |

Review scores
| Publication | Score |
|---|---|
| Destructoid | 6/10 |
| Nintendo Life | 7/10 |
| Pocket Gamer | 3.5/5 |
| Cubed3 | 7/10 |

Kirby's Blowout Blast received "mixed or average" reviews from critics, according to the review aggregation website Metacritic. Fellow review aggregator OpenCritic assessed that the game received weak approval, being recommended by only 13% of critics.

Tim Latshaw of Nintendo Life stated that the game's levels encouraged replayability, but did not vary much. He also praised the game's graphics. In his review for Vice, Chris Schilling called the game "another successful spin-off" for the series. Jon Mundy of Pocket Gamer called the game satisfying, stating that he enjoyed how the game handled spitting projectiles. The game was heavily criticized by Markus Grundmann of Eurogamer, who found the levels repetitive. In his review for Cubed3, Drew Hurley praised the game's replayability, but criticized it for being too short and easy.

== See also ==
- List of Kirby media
- 2017 in video games
