= Kirby's Pinball Land =

1993 video game

- North American cover art
- Developer: HAL Laboratory
- Publisher: Nintendo
- Composer: Tadashi Ikegami
- Series: Kirby
- Platform: Game Boy
- Release: JP: November 27, 1993; NA: November 30, 1993; EU: December 1, 1993
- Genre: Pinball
- Mode: Single-player

Kirby's Pinball Land (Note: Known in Japan as Kirby no Pinball (カービィのピンボール, Kābī no Pinbōru; lit. Kirby's Pinball)) is a 1993 pinball video game developed by HAL Laboratory and published by Nintendo for the Game Boy. It was HAL Laboratory's third pinball video game after the MSX and NES title Rollerball and the Game Boy title Revenge of the 'Gator. It was also the first spin-off and second Game Boy title in the Kirby series, as well as the second pinball video game Nintendo published after the NES title Pinball. The game was rereleased on the Nintendo 3DS' Virtual Console service in July 2012.

The game stars Kirby as the ball, and features three pinball tables, each owned by a classic boss of the Kirby series: Whispy Woods, Kracko, and Poppy Bros.

== Gameplay ==
The game is played much like that of pinball, with two flippers used to help keep Kirby in play as he bounces off walls, bumpers, and enemies, scoring points by doing so. Defeating certain enemies earns bonus points and multipliers, which combine to provide a bonus at the end of each life. Players can also earn Maxim Tomatoes which helps block the drain for a short period. The game is made up of three tables; Whispy Woods, Kracko, and Poppy Bros, each made up of three floors. The game aims to help Kirby make his way up to the top floor in order to access each table's boss.

Each floor has various gimmicks that either help Kirby to reach the next floor, such as characters that throw Kirby upwards or bring in a Warp Star that Kirby can hop onto. Warp Stars on the bottom floor take Kirby to the table selection screen, Warp Stars on the middle floor takes Kirby to a minigame, where he can earn extra points and multipliers, and Warp Stars on the top floor take Kirby to that table's boss fight. Each boss fight requires the player to deal a certain number of hits to the boss without hitting the Warp Star at the bottom and returning to the top screen. After defeating all three bosses, players then fight against King Dedede. After defeating Dedede, the player can play the three tables again to aim for a higher score.

If Kirby falls down the drain on the bottom floor of each table, he will land on a springboard. By timing the A button at the moment where the springboard is at its lowest, Kirby can spring back up to the table, with well-timed presses returning him to the top floor. However, the springboard becomes smaller with each use, making it more difficult to successfully spring back up. If Kirby fails to jump back into the table, the player will lose a life, with the game ending once the player has run out of lives. Extra lives can be earned by spelling out the word 'Extra' with letters that appear on the table selection screen after bosses have been defeated.

== Reception ==
Contemporary reception

Review scores
Publication	Score
Electronic Gaming Monthly	8/10, 7/10, 7/10, 7/10
Famitsu	7/10, 6/10, 7/10, 7/10

Kirby's Pinball Land was released in Japan on November 27, 1993. In the United Kingdom, it was the top-selling Game Boy game for two months in 1994, from March to April. In Famitsu, the four reviewers complimented the game for atmosphere and secrets and surprises, with one reviewer commenting it lacked the amount of features the similar game Devil's Crush had. One reviewer described it as a "very-well rounded game" while two others commented on its difficulty, saying it was very easy for the ball to fall between the paddles.

The critics in Electronic Gaming Monthly criticized that the blurring of the Game Boy screen makes it difficult to see what's going on, but nonetheless deemed it "one of the better pinball games for any system" due to the ability to recover lost balls, the multi-table gameplay, and the large number of hidden things to find. Nintendo Power ranked Kirby's Pinball Land the fifth best Game Boy game of 1993.

=== Retrospective ===
Retrospective reception

Aggregate score
Aggregator	Score
GameRankings	70%

Review scores
Publication	Score
IGN	8/10
Nintendo Life	4/10

Retrospectively, it holds an average score of 70% at GameRankings. In a retrospective review, IGN praised it as a quality Game Boy pinball game, describing it as being both involving and fun. Kirby's Pinball Land was one of the nominees for IGN's "Game Boy Action Game of the Century" Reader's Choice award. 1UP.com commented that "Spin-offs are a groan-inducing inevitability for popular series, but Kirby's Pinball Land is one of those ideas that just make good sense." The engine used in Kirby's Pinball Land would later be used in another Nintendo game, Pokémon Pinball. Super Gamer Magazine gave the Game an overall review score of 85% writing: "Highly playable pinball game with loads of levels and bonuses. Screen blurs slightly, but this doesn't make it any less fun." Philip J. Reed of Nintendo Life was more negative, criticizing the repetitive gameplay and poor implementation of Kirby series elements, as well as its frequent disruption of gameplay.
