= Kirby: Canvas Curse =

2005 video game

- North American box art
- Developer: HAL Laboratory
- Publisher: Nintendo
- Director: Motomi Katayama
- Producers: Hiroaki Suga; Masayoshi Tanimura; Kensuke Tanabe
- Designer: Tomomi Minami
- Programmer: Teruyuki Gunji
- Composers: Jun Ishikawa; Tadashi Ikegami
- Series: Kirby
- Platform: Nintendo DS
- Release: JP: March 24, 2005; NA: June 13, 2005; AU: October 6, 2005; EU: November 25, 2005
- Genre: Platform
- Mode: Single-player

Kirby: Canvas Curse, (Note: Known in Japan as Touch! Kirby (タッチ！カービィ, Tacchi! Kābī)) known in Europe as Kirby: Power Paintbrush, is a 2005 platform game developed by HAL Laboratory and published by Nintendo for the Nintendo DS.

Kirby: Canvas Curse does not play like a traditional Kirby game, as it solely requires the use of the stylus. A Wii U sequel, Kirby and the Rainbow Curse, was released in 2015. The game was rereleased for the Wii U's Virtual Console in Europe and Australia in December 2015 (as Power Paintbrush in both regions), in Japan in February 2016, and in North America in October 2016.

== Gameplay ==
Screenshot depicting the gameplay in Kirby: Canvas Curse

The game is played using the stylus and touch screen to control Kirby, who rolls around in ball form. The player can draw rainbow lines to form ramps or bridges for Kirby to cross, and walls to protect him from enemies and hazards. Drawing paths depletes the player's rainbow ink supplies, which recharge over time.

The player can use the stylus to stun enemies by tapping on them and defeat them by either rolling or dashing into them. Defeating certain kinds of enemies grants Kirby various special abilities such as shooting beams or turning into a rocket, which may be used at any time by tapping on Kirby himself.

Kirby: Canvas Curse spans eight worlds, with all but one having three levels with the objective of reaching a rainbow-colored doorway. A variety of themes are used throughout the game, ranging from volcanos to frozen tundras. Portions of these levels can be played in Rainbow Run mode, where players are challenged to finish a level within as little time as possible or utilizing minimal lines. At the end of each world except for world seven, Kirby must face a mini-game-based boss battle.

Kirby: Canvas Curse features collectible medals, which can be obtained through the main levels, by defeating bosses, or through the Rainbow Run challenge mode, and may be used to unlock secret features in the game, such as characters, sound tests, and alternate paint colors.

== Plot ==
One day, a strange portal appears in the sky, and out of it comes the witch Drawcia. Drawcia casts a spell over Dream Land, turning it into a world of paint. Upon fleeing back into the portal she came through, Kirby gives chase, finding himself in Drawcia's paint-themed world. The witch curses Kirby, turning him into a limbless ball. After Drawcia escapes, the Magical Paintbrush (Power Paintbrush in the European version) turns to the player to help Kirby. Kirby sets off to find and defeat Drawcia to restore Dream Land to its normal state. Along the way, Drawcia creates replicas of Kirby's oldest opponents to slow him down. These include Paint Roller, Kracko, Kracko Jr., and King Dedede. Kirby eventually confronts Drawcia, but after her defeat she transforms into the fearsome Drawcia Soul. Kirby defeats her once and for all and peace is restored.

== Reception ==
=== Critical response ===
Reception

Aggregate score
Aggregator	Score
Metacritic	86/100

Review scores
Publication	Score
Edge	7/10
Electronic Gaming Monthly	8.83/10
Eurogamer	9/10
Famitsu	34/40
Game Informer	8.5/10
GamePro	4/5
GameRevolution	B+
GameSpot	8.6/10
GameSpy	4.5/5
GameZone	8.8/10
IGN	9/10
Nintendo Power	9/10
Detroit Free Press	3/4
The Sydney Morning Herald	4/5

Awards
Publication	Award
GameSpy	Editors' Choice
IGN	Editors' Choice Award

Kirby: Canvas Curse received "generally favorable" reviews according to the review aggregation website Metacritic. In Japan, four critics from Famitsu gave the game a total score of 34 out of 40.

1UP.com called it "genuinely excellent", saying that "it's a welcome reinvention of gaming's most overplayed genre" and later concluded that Canvas Curse is "the DS's first great game". The stylus gameplay has also been noted, with IGN hailing it as "incredibly innovative", GameSpy calling it "quite rewarding", and GameSpot calling it "a satisfying part of the gameplay." Official Nintendo Magazine ranked it the 96th best game available on Nintendo platforms. On the other hand, Play's editor disagreed, noting that "it's innovative... but for me, that's not enough."

The New York Times gave it a very favorable review and called it "tremendous fun". The Sydney Morning Herald gave it four stars out of five, saying that "Kirby's use of touch-screen technology provides a fresh and engaging game." However, Detroit Free Press gave it three stars out of four, stating that "there is some nice innovation, such as levels that are completely black until Kirby bumps into lanterns that put off light. And as we all know, in dark places like this, it's good to have a friend."

=== Sales ===
Kirby: Canvas Curse was the third best-selling game in Japan during its week of release at 75,365 units sold. Famitsu annual sales for the region show that the game sold 276,418 copies by the end of 2005. According to the NPD Group, the game sold just under 80,000 copies in North America during the month of June 2005. The following month, it was the top-selling DS game in the region at 50,000 copies.

== See also ==
- List of Kirby media
- List of Nintendo DS games
- List of platformers
- 2005 in video games
