= Kirby's Dream Land 2 =

1995 video game

- North American box art
- Developer: HAL Laboratory
- Publisher: Nintendo
- Director: Shinichi Shimomura
- Producers: Satoru Iwata; Shigeru Miyamoto
- Designers: Shinichi Shimomura; Kensuke Tanabe; Hideki Fujii
- Programmers: Yoshiki Suzuki; Shimei Tei; Masashi Yamane
- Artists: Shigeru Hashiguchi; Kazuya Miura; Yoshiko Ohkubo
- Composers: Hirokazu Ando; Tadashi Ikegami
- Series: Kirby
- Platform: Game Boy
- Release: JP: March 21, 1995; NA: May 1, 1995; EU: July 31, 1995; AU: November 22, 1995
- Genre: Platform
- Mode: Single-player

Kirby's Dream Land 2 (Note: Known in Japan as Hoshi no Kirby 2 (星のカービィ2, Hoshi no Kābī Tsū; lit. Kirby of the Stars 2)) is a 1995 platform game developed by HAL Laboratory and published by Nintendo for the Game Boy handheld video game console. It was released in Japan on March 21, 1995, in North America on May 1, 1995, in Europe on July 31, 1995, and in Australia on November 22, 1995.

Kirby's Dream Land 2 continues the adventures of Kirby from Kirby's Dream Land and Kirby's Adventure, adding three animal friends to aid Kirby in battle. It can be played on the Super Game Boy, and gives slight changes to the game, such as adding a custom color scheme, a special game border, and a few new sound effects.

The game was re-released on the 3DS's Virtual Console in Japan on February 15, 2012, in PAL regions on May 17, 2012, and in North America on August 1, 2013. Kirby's Dream Land 2 is also included in Kirby's Dream Collection for the Wii.

== Plot ==
The plot follows Kirby, a resident of Dream Land. The Rainbow Bridges that connect the seven Rainbow Islands have been stolen by an evil force called Dark Matter, who has possessed King Dedede, intent on conquering Dream Land. Kirby sets out to defeat Dark Matter, accompanied by three new animal friends, Rick the hamster, Kine the fish, and Coo the owl. After traveling through across the Rainbow Islands, Kirby reaches the possessed King Dedede and defeats him. If the player had previously collected all seven Rainbow Drops from each of the islands, they form into the Rainbow Sword and exorcise Dark Matter from the defeated Dedede. Holding the mystic object, Kirby follows Dark Matter in a final showdown. He defeats Dark Matter and uses the sword to create a new rainbow, thus restoring peace to Dream Land.

== Gameplay ==
Kirby swimming with Kine in the second stage in Ripple Field

Kirby's Dream Land 2, like the previous Kirby titles, is a platforming video game. Kirby is able to walk, swim, and fly throughout a variety of levels, using several allies and enemy powers in order to reach the goal at the end of each level. However, a variety of obstacles lie in his path. These obstacles range from pits to enemies. If Kirby touches an enemy, touches a dangerous obstacle, or is hit by an enemy's attack, Kirby will lose one bar of health (out of six total health points). Kirby can recover lost health by eating food. The player starts the game with three lives, one of which is lost each time Kirby's health is depleted or he falls off the bottom of the screen. The game ends when the player runs out of lives, although they can resume their game from the most recent save point by choosing to continue.

Kirby's basic abilities include running, jumping, flight, swimming, and inhaling. Flight involves inhaling air (Up button), followed with the press of the jump button which will make Kirby fly. By continuously pushing the jump button, Kirby can reach any height (unless something prevents him from reaching that height). At any time when Kirby has inhaled air, he can exhale by either landing on the ground or you can also release it yourself. When the air is released, Kirby will exhale a puff of air, which can be used to damage enemies or destroy blocks.

Inhaling objects, enemies, and food is the trademark ability of Kirby's. To inhale anything, the player must hold down the B button. Kirby can then indefinitely inhale, and if an enemy, object, or food is in range, Kirby will eat it. When food is inhaled, it is automatically swallowed and will heal Kirby if he has any damage. When Kirby inhales an enemy or object, it remains in his mouth. At this point, Kirby can shoot them out as a star (causing damage to anything in its path), or simply swallow them. When certain enemies are swallowed, Kirby will gain their ability, such as ice breath or the ability to turn into stone.

Kirby's Dream Land 2 introduces the animal friends, three new allies that Kirby can ride to aide him in his adventure: Rick the hamster, who runs faster, and doesn't slip on ice; Coo the owl, who can fly quickly even through harsh winds, and allows Kirby to inhale while flying; and Kine the ocean sunfish, who can swim through waters with ease even against currents (although he performs poorly on land), and with whom Kirby can inhale underwater. Whenever Kirby is aided by an animal friend, his current power is altered. For example, if Kirby has the Spark ability, riding on Rick will change it to the Beam attack from Kirby's Adventure while Coo will allow Kirby to shoot down a lightning bolt from the sky and Kine lets Kirby shoot light bulbs at his enemies.

== Presentation ==
Like Kirby's Dream Land, Kirby's Dream Land 2's visuals are grayscale and two-dimensional. However, when played on the Super Game Boy, there is a special border with Kirby's animal friends, and the graphics are drawn in limited color. For example, each stage has a color theme, such as "Grass Land" being yellowscale, "Big Forest" being greenscale, etc. The world map gets more colors. Each "land" is its respective color, and the sky is blue with white clouds. Also, the in-level status bar has its own separate color scheme. Also, the ending sequence has a unique color palette that makes use of as many colors as the Super Game Boy would allow, such as Kirby painting a rainbow. There are some special sound effects added using the Super Nintendo's sound chip as well. On the game start screen, the sound of applause plays; on the stage select screen, gusts of wind blow; and on the final stage, the sound of thunder booming plays.

Unlike the original Kirby's Dream Land, Kirby's Dream Land 2 is composed by both Hirokazu Ando and Tadashi Ikegami, both regular composers for HAL Laboratory.

== Reception ==
Reception

Review scores
Publication	Score
Electronic Gaming Monthly	9/10, 7.5/10, 7/10, 7/10
EP Daily	9.5/10
Famitsu	8/10, 7/10, 7/10, 7/10
Game Players	70%
Jeuxvideo.com	17/20
Official Nintendo Magazine	93/100
Video Games (DE)	82%

Kirby's Dream Land 2 sold more than a million units. Electronic Gaming Monthly's four reviewers had varying reactions to the game, but gave it a unanimous recommendation based chiefly on the solid graphics and the wide variety of abilities which Kirby can acquire. GamePro likewise praised Kirby's many abilities. Though they complained that the game recycles too much content from the original Kirby's Dream Land, they concluded that "While not everything is new in Dream Land 2, everything is definitely fun".

Nintendo Power listed it as the tenth best Game Boy/Game Boy Color video game, praising it for adding the ability to gain new powers by eating enemies. In addition, the game is noted for being one of the hardest games to obtain a completion rating of 100% in the Kirby series. In 2019, PC Magazine included Kirby’s Dream Land 2 on their "The 10 Best Game Boy Games".
