= Hirokazu Ando =

Japanese composer (born 1969)

- 安藤浩和
- Born: March 2, 1969 (age 57); Chiba Prefecture, Japan
- Education: Hirosaki University
- Occupations: Composer; musician
- Employer: HAL Laboratory (1991–present)
- Musical career
- Genres: Video game music; chiptune
- Instruments: Electone; bass; keyboard

Hirokazu Ando (安藤浩和, Ando Hirokazu; born March 2, 1969) is a Japanese composer. Along with Jun Ishikawa, Ando is best known for composing for the Kirby video game series. He has also composed for other games developed by the company, such as Super Smash Bros. (1999), Super Smash Bros. Melee (2001) and the BoxBoy! series.

== Biography ==
Ando started learning to play the Electone aged 3–4 up to his second year in high school. It was this experience that also taught him how to read chords and sheet music. He listened to a wide variety of music as a child, including works by Ryuichi Sakamoto and Claude Debussy. Being immersed in music had allowed to think about sound a considerable amount and helped form his own sensibilities. Despite his musical background, Ando initially did not have interest in being a composer.

He attended Hirosaki University in order to major in physics in the science department. While he was in college, he had purchased an MSX computer that sparked an initial interest in video games. Ando became inspired to be a video game composer after playing Dragon Quest II for the first time and being impressed by its music. He then created his own music playing program and sent it to HAL. Soon after, he was hired to work on sound.

== Works ==
=== Video games ===
| Year | Title | Notes |
|---|---|---|
| 1991 | HyperZone | Music with Jun Ishikawa |
| 1992 | Arcana | Music with Jun Ishikawa |
| 1993 | Kirby's Adventure | Music |
| 1994 | Kirby's Dream Course | Music |
| 1995 | Kirby's Dream Land 2 | Music with Tadashi Ikegami |
| 1997 | Kirby's Star Stacker | Music |
| 1998 | Kirby's Super Star Stacker | Music with Jun Ishikawa |
| 1999 | Super Smash Bros. | Music |
| 2000 | Kirby 64: The Crystal Shards | Music with Jun Ishikawa |
| 2001 | Super Smash Bros. Melee | Music with Shogo Sakai, Tadashi Ikegami, and Takuto Kitsuta |
| 2002 | Kirby: Nightmare in Dream Land | Music with Jun Ishikawa, Tadashi Ikegami, and Shogo Sakai |
| 2003 | Kirby Air Ride | Music with Jun Ishikawa, Tadashi Ikegami, and Shogo Sakai |
| 2006 | Common Sense Training | Music with Jun Ishikawa and Tadashi Ikegami |
| 2006 | Kirby: Squeak Squad | Music with Jun Ishikawa, Tadashi Ikegami, and Shogo Sakai |
| 2008 | Kirby Super Star Ultra | Music with Jun Ishikawa |
| 2009 | Picross 3D | Music with Yasumasa Yamada and Jun Ishikawa |
| 2010 | Kirby's Epic Yarn | Music with Tomoya Tomita, Jun Ishikawa, and Tadashi Ikegami |
| 2011 | Kirby's Return to Dream Land | Music with Jun Ishikawa |
| 2012 | Kirby's Dream Collection | Music with Jun Ishikawa and Shogo Sakai |
| 2014 | Kirby: Triple Deluxe | Music with Jun Ishikawa |
| 2015 | BoxBoy! | Music with Jun Ishikawa |
| 2015 | Picross 3D: Round 2 | Music with Megumi Ohara and Shogo Sakai |
| 2016 | BoxBoxBoy! | Music with Jun Ishikawa |
| 2016 | Kirby: Planet Robobot | Music with Jun Ishikawa |
| 2017 | Bye-Bye BoxBoy! | Music with Jun Ishikawa |
| 2017 | Team Kirby Clash Deluxe | Music with Jun Ishikawa |
| 2017 | Kirby's Blowout Blast | Music with Jun Ishikawa |
| 2018 | Kirby Star Allies | Music with Jun Ishikawa and Yuuta Ogasawara |
| 2019 | BoxBoy! + BoxGirl! | Music with Jun Ishikawa and Yuuta Ogasawara |
| 2019 | Super Kirby Clash | Music with Kiyoshi Hazemoto, Jun Ishikawa and Tadashi Ikegami |
| 2020 | Kirby Fighters 2 | Music with Kiyoshi Hazemoto, Jun Ishikawa and Yuki Shimooka |
| 2022 | Kirby and the Forgotten Land | Music with various others (Note: Jun Ishikawa, Yuuta Ogasawara, Yuki Shimooka, and Tadashi Ikegami) |
| 2022 | Kirby's Dream Buffet | Music with various others (Note: Shogo Sakai, Jun Ishikawa, Megumi Ohara, and Yuki Shimooka) |
| 2023 | Kirby's Return to Dream Land Deluxe | Music with various others (Note: Jun Ishikawa, Yuki Shimooka, Kiyoshi Hazemoto, and Yuki Kato) |
