= BoxBoy! (video game) =

2015 video game

- Developer: HAL Laboratory
- Publisher: Nintendo
- Director: Yasuhiro Mukae
- Producers: Satoshi Mitsuhara; Keisuke Terasaki
- Designer: Haruka Itou
- Programmer: Takashi Nozue
- Artist: Tatsuya Kamiyama
- Composers: Jun Ishikawa; Hirokazu Ando
- Series: BoxBoy!
- Platform: Nintendo 3DS
- Release: JP: January 14, 2015; WW: April 2, 2015
- Genre: Puzzle-platform
- Mode: Single-player

BoxBoy! (Note: Japanese: ハコボーイ, Hepburn: Hako Bōi!) is a 2015 puzzle-platform game developed by HAL Laboratory and published by Nintendo for the Nintendo 3DS. It is the first installment in the BoxBoy! series. Players control Qbby, a square-shaped character who can produce a string of connected boxes. The boxes are used to overcome obstacles in stages that Qbby must be guided through.

BoxBoy! was conceptualized in 2011 by director Yasuhiro Mukae, although the game did not enter development until 2013. The core gameplay concept remained the same throughout the title's development, however, changes were made to length of levels and the structure of the game. Each set of stages was designed with a specific theme in mind with the intention of expanding the game's depth by introducing new elements continuously. The game was released via the Nintendo eShop distribution service in Japan in January 2015, and worldwide in April 2015.

BoxBoy! received a positive reception from critics. Reviewers praised the game's creative puzzles and inventive use of the box-manipulation mechanics. Some critics were pleasantly surprised by the amount of content that was offered and agreed that the package was good value for money. However, the game's simple art style was divisive among reviewers. A sequel, BoxBoxBoy!, was released for the Nintendo 3DS in 2016, with a third game, Bye-Bye BoxBoy!, in 2017. A fourth installment, BoxBoy! + BoxGirl!, was released for the Nintendo Switch in April 2019.

== Gameplay ==
Qbby uses boxes to shield himself from the lasers. He can then detach and drop the boxes on the switch to open the door ahead.

BoxBoy! is a puzzle platform video game in which players control a square-shaped character named Qbby. The goal of the game is to guide Qbby through a series of obstacle-filled stages that are divided into sets called worlds. Each world is focused on a particular gameplay theme: for example, one world introduces stages that contain deadly lasers, and another introduces cranes for transporting Qbby around. The central gameplay mechanic is Qbby's ability to create boxes and make use of them to clear the obstacles. Boxes are created one at a time as a connected string and the maximum number of boxes in a string varies between each stage. Qbby can detach the string of boxes then push it to different positions. The boxes can be used to overcome obstacles, such as creating a bridge to pass bottomless pits or building staircases to reach higher platforms. Additionally, Qbby can keep the string of boxes attached to his body. He may then use the boxes as a shield to block hazards such as deadly lasers. He is also able to grapple onto ledges and pull himself up by retracting through the boxes. Creating a new string of boxes causes the previous string to disappear. If Qbby dies, he will respawn at a nearby checkpoint.

Completing stages rewards the player with medals that can be spent on challenge stages, music, and costumes for Qbby. Additional medals can be earned by collecting crowns found on each stage, which must be collected before a certain number of boxes are used. The game makes use of the Nintendo 3DS' Play Coin feature; Play Coins can be used to request hints to the puzzle solutions. BoxBoy! features a black and white monochrome graphical style. The game features a minimal story, in which Qbby meets two additional characters, Qucy and Qudy, after progressing through certain worlds.

== Development and release ==
BoxBoy! was developed by Japanese video game company HAL Laboratory. It was a small experimental project in development while the studio was working on Kirby: Triple Deluxe and Kirby and the Rainbow Curse. The project plan for BoxBoy! was conceived in July 2011 by employee Yasuhiro Mukae, who would later serve as the game's director. Prior to BoxBoy!, Mukae had never designed or directed a game, but his interest in undertaking these roles prompted him to start planning a project. His lack of experience and the difficulty of designing a game with a large scope led him to plan a game that was simple and compact. The concept of BoxBoy! arose when he was brainstorming ideas for a game that featured retro gameplay, in the style of titles released on the Nintendo Entertainment System and the Game Boy. The idea was simply creating and using boxes to traverse puzzle levels. Several members of staff saw potential in the concept and created a prototype for demonstration. Mukae's product proposal wasn't formally submitted to HAL until 2013, when the company announced that it would field game design concepts featuring new characters. The development team spent about six months experimenting with the game's design. Once development of Kirby: Triple Deluxe concluded, some members of its development team joined the BoxBoy! development team and the project entered full production. The game was complete after a year in full production.

To give each world a theme, they were each designed with a particular gameplay element in mind. This approach created a structure where players would be introduced to new gameplay mechanics frequently. The intention was to keep the game engaging and continually expand the depth of gameplay as players progressed through the game. The first stage of each world is designed to be a simple puzzle that teaches players the new mechanic. Initially, the development team were creating large stages that would take a fairly long time to complete. However, they later decided that players should be able to complete them quicker, and thus the level structure was changed and the amount of content per stage was reduced. Story elements were also added to encourage players to keep playing. Creating an intuitive and easy control scheme was an important factor as the development team wanted to ensure that the action of creating boxes was comfortable and fun. The development team had considered implementing a multiplayer mode for BoxBoy!. Ultimately, the feature was excluded as they believed that making a fun single-player experience should be the priority. However, multiplayer would later be added in the series' fourth installment, Boxboy! + Boxgirl!.

The use of black and white line art for the game's graphics was an attempt to differentiate it from other games and catch the interest of gamers. Implementing it presented some challenges for the design staff. The design of Qbby, the player character, came after the idea of creating boxes was established; he was designed from a functional perspective. At one point in development, while brainstorming BoxBoy!'s visual style, the team had considered making Kirby the main character. It became difficult trying to make Kirby, a round character, look natural in the box-producing action, so they settled with a character that had a square-shaped body, the same as the boxes. Feet were added to Qbby so he could move and jump, and eyes were added so the player could recognise which direction he was facing. Since Qbby had a simple design, the team focussed on making his animations expressive to ensure the character was engaging and had a personality.

BoxBoy! was published by Nintendo. The game was released for the Nintendo 3DS handheld console via the eShop distribution service in Japan on January 14, 2015, and worldwide on April 2, 2015.

== Reception ==
Reception

Aggregate scores
Aggregator	Score
Metacritic	80/100
OpenCritic	71% recommend

Review scores
Publication	Score
Eurogamer	Recommended
Game Informer	8.25/10
GameSpot	8/10
IGN	8.2/10
Nintendo Life	6/10
Shacknews	8/10
USgamer	4.5/5
VentureBeat	80/100

BoxBoy! received generally favourable reviews from critics according to review aggregator website Metacritic.

Some reviewers highlighted that the early stages in BoxBoy! felt too basic, and consequently, the game did not make a great first impression. GameSpot writer Justin Haywald described the simplicity of the game's initial puzzles as "almost off-putting". However, he was satisfied with the more elaborate stages presented after progressing through the game, calling the puzzles "ingenious" and praising the intelligent use of the box-manipulation mechanic. IGN's Jose Otero complimented the game's level design and challenge posed by later stages in the game. He also liked the game's generous checkpoint system, noting that it was helpful during the more difficult puzzles. Bob Mackey of USgamer mentioned that the friendly approach, short levels, and frequent checkpoints did not detract from the game's challenge; he said that by allowing players to quickly test different solutions without having to restart a stage, HAL had managed to remove the frustration typically found in similar block-based puzzle games.

Christian Donlan of Eurogamer was surprised by the long length of the game and the amount of variety it offered given its simple premise. He enjoyed the game's pacing and felt that separating puzzles into short levels kept the game fun. Game Informer reviewer Kyle Hilliard also approved of the game's pacing. He remarked that BoxBoy!'s low price and well-designed puzzles made it entirely worth playing. VentureBeat writer Gavin Greene agreed that the game offered a lot of content at an inexpensive price. The game's structure did draw some criticism from Jon Wahlgren, writing for Nintendo Life. He thought the game spent too much time teaching new mechanics and did not give players enough freedom to explore or experiment; as a result, he believed the game felt restricted.

According to some writers, BoxBoy!'s graphics and art resembled the style found in Game Boy titles; the reaction towards it was mixed among reviewers. While some critics described the graphics as "charming" and "stylish", others called it "sterile". The expressive animations and cute character designs were well received.

== Sequels ==
In 2016, a sequel titled BoxBoxBoy! was released for the Nintendo 3DS, allowing Qbby to create two sets of boxes at a time. The game was announced and released in Japan on January 6, 2016, and in other territories on June 30, 2016. A third game, titled Bye-Bye BoxBoy!, was released in 2017. The game adds new kinds of boxes, such as explosive bombs and rocket propelled boxes, as well as box children that need to be escorted safely through levels. A physical compilation of all three games, titled HakoBoy! Hakozume Box (Note: Japanese: ハコボーイ！ ハコづめBOX; lit. BoxBoy! Stuffed Box), was also released in Japan the same day. The compilation also included a soundtrack CD featuring the music from all three games, as well as a Qbby Amiibo figure, the latter of which can be used with Bye-Bye BoxBoy!. In a February 2019 Nintendo Direct, a fourth game was announced for the Nintendo Switch as BoxBoy! + BoxGirl!.
