= Kirby's Return to Dream Land =

2011 video game

- North American box art
- Developer: HAL Laboratory
- Publisher: Nintendo
- Director: Shinya Kumazaki
- Producers: Hiroaki Suga; Hitoshi Yamagami; Shigefumi Kawase
- Programmer: Hiroaki Nakano
- Artist: Tadashi Kamitake
- Writer: Shinya Kumazaki
- Composers: Hirokazu Ando; Jun Ishikawa
- Series: Kirby
- Platform: Wii
- Release: NA: October 24, 2011; JP: October 27, 2011; EU: November 25, 2011; AU: December 1, 2011; KOR: September 6, 2012
- Genre: Platform
- Modes: Single-player, multiplayer

Kirby's Return to Dream Land (Note: Japanese: 星のカービィ Wii, Hepburn: Hoshi no Kābī Wī; lit. 'Kirby of the Stars Wii') (known as Kirby's Adventure Wii in Europe and Australia) is a 2011 platform game developed by HAL Laboratory and published by Nintendo for the Wii. It is the ninth mainline installment and the twenty-second game in the Kirby series. The plot follows Kirby, King Dedede, Meta Knight and Bandana Waddle Dee as they help an alien named Magolor repair his damaged spaceship so he can return home. While Kirby's Epic Yarn was released in 2010, Kirby's Return to Dream Land is the first traditional Kirby platforming home console game since Kirby 64: The Crystal Shards, which was released in 2000 for the Nintendo 64. The title was released in North America on October 24, 2011, in Japan on October 27, 2011, in Europe on November 25, 2011, in Australia on December 1, 2011, and in South Korea on September 6, 2012.

Kirby's Return to Dream Land features the staple gameplay of traditional Kirby platform games, in which Kirby possesses the ability to inhale and copy enemies to gain a variety of attacks such as breathing fire or swinging a sword. The game supports cooperative multiplayer gameplay, allowing up to four players to control various Kirby characters, including King Dedede, Meta Knight and Bandana Waddle Dee.

The game was announced as a GameCube title to be released in late 2005, but development of the title was later shifted to the successor console, the Wii. The game was presumed to be canceled until it was re-announced in 2011. The game was made available on the Wii U's Nintendo eShop in 2015.

Some elements from the canceled Kirby title of 2005 were carried over to Kirby's Return to Dream Land, such as the ability for players to stack up in a totem carried by the player on the bottom of the stack. Other elements from the Kirby title of 2005, such as Kirby's ability to befriend up to three "Helpers" (a gameplay mechanic from Kirby Super Star), were modified and carried over to another Kirby game, released in 2018 on the Nintendo Switch, Kirby Star Allies. Kirby's Return to Dream Land received generally positive reviews, with praise for the return to form of the traditional Kirby series gameplay, level design, visuals, graphics and soundtrack, but criticism for its low difficulty and multiplayer. A remake for the Nintendo Switch, Kirby's Return to Dream Land Deluxe, (Note: Japanese: 星のカービィ Wii デラックス, Hepburn: Hoshi no Kābī Wī Derakkusu; lit. 'Kirby of the Stars Wii Deluxe') was released on February 24, 2023.

== Gameplay ==
Return to Dream Land is a 2.5D side-scrolling platform game, controlled by holding the Wii Remote sideways. Unlike previous entries in the Kirby series, the game features 3D models for player characters and enemies rather than sprites.

Throughout the game, Kirby can collect items which will heal him. This includes food items that recover health and items which grants an extra life. An extra life will also be granted upon collecting 100 stars. There are also items Kirby can use to interact with the environment. At the end of each stage, a bonus game is played in which players time a button press to jump as high as possible to earn extra items.

Kirby's Return to Dream Land supports cooperative multiplayer for up to four players.

The player controls Kirby, who retains his signature ability to inhale objects and enemies. The inhaled objects can either be swallowed, or propelled back out as a projectile. Kirby can also perform a "Super Inhale", where shaking the Wii Remote or inhaling for a long time makes Kirby's inhale stronger. A Super Inhale has extended range and can suck up "Heave-ho Blocks", which are immovable from a regular inhale. The Super Inhale also allows Kirby to inhale other players and most large enemies.

Certain enemies, when swallowed, lets Kirby access a wide variety of "Copy Abilities", which gives Kirby the attack properties of the enemies he inhales. Kirby can only possess one copy ability at a time. Other players playing as another character through multiplayer, or those playing as King Dedede, Meta Knight, or Waddle Dee, can hold onto a Copy Ability's essence and throw them back to Kirby to be inhaled. If a discarded ability from these characters is left untouched, it will vanish shortly afterward.

Each copy ability has multiple attacks that are utilized depending on the combination of button-inputs pressed by the player. New abilities introduced in this game are the Whip ability, which lets Kirby grab out-of-reach items, the Water ability, which lets Kirby extinguish fires, and the Leaf ability, which lets Kirby use leaves as a form of attack and conjure a pile of leaves to hide in and become invulnerable to nearly all assaults. The Nintendo Switch remake introduces both the Mecha ability, which gives Kirby laser cannons and robotic arms, and the Sand ability, which allows Kirby to morph sand into various shapes, as well as reintroducing the Festival ability from Kirby Star Allies.

The game introduces more powerful, temporary Copy Abilities called "Super Abilities", which can destroy portions of the environment and inflict tremendous damage across a wide range. Unlike regular Copy Abilities, ejecting a Super Ability will cause the Super Ability to be discarded instantly. Five Super Abilities exist: Ultra Sword, Monster Flame, Flare Beam, Grand Hammer, and Snow Bowl, which are enhanced versions of the Sword, Fire, Beam, Hammer, and Ice Copy Abilities respectively.

The game features drop-in cooperative multiplayer for up to three additional players. These players can either play as a yellow, blue or green Kirby, or as one of three unique characters: Meta Knight, King Dedede, and Waddle Dee. All of these characters have traits from corresponding Copy Abilities based on the way each character moves and attacks, though only Kirbys are able to inhale enemies and use Copy Abilities. Players can ride on top of each other as a "totem", which, with perfect timing, allows the use of a charged attack, called the "Team Attack", driven by the player at the bottom. Players can also share recently ingested health-restoring items through a move called "Face-to-Face". Within the Epilogue introduced in the Switch remake, Magolor becomes a playable character, having been stripped of his powers and forced to regain them. He is able to levitate for short intervals and produce energy attacks at first, and gains more abilities when the player upgrades them. Players 2–4 can play as various recolors of Magolor in this mode.

All players share from a pool of lives, with each player requiring one life to enter the game. If one of the three additional players loses a life, they can spend an extra life to rejoin the game. However, if player one dies, all players stop and gameplay restarts from the last checkpoint.

== Plot ==
One day, a dimension-hopping spaceship called the Lor Starcutter suddenly flies out of a dimensional rift and crashes onto Kirby's home planet of Popstar. As Kirby, Meta Knight, King Dedede and Bandana Waddle Dee go to investigate, they meet an alien named Magolor, who discovers that the five vital pieces of his ship have been scattered across the planet, with the 120 Energy Spheres being scattered across both Popstar and Halcandra. With Magolor offering them a trip to his homeworld of Halcandra should they help fix his ship, Kirby and his friends set off to recover the lost pieces.

After retrieving the main pieces, they travel to Halcandra, where they are attacked by a four-headed dragon named Landia. Magolor claims Landia is an evil beast that has taken over Halcandra and sends Kirby to defeat it. However, after Landia is defeated, Magolor reveals his true motive was to steal the Master Crown on its head and become almighty. He wears the crown and uses it to turn into a large monster, with the intent of making the entire universe bow before him, beginning with Popstar. Teaming up with Landia, who has split into four individual dragons, Kirby and his friends go chase Magolor in Another Dimension. During the chase, Magolor uses the Lor Starcutter to try to defeat Kirby and his friends, but Kirby and his friends defeat the Lor Starcutter. Magalor removes Kirby and his friends from the Landia dragons before they come to fight him in a final battle. During the battle, Magolor transforms into a larger monster. Kirby and his friends destroy the Master Crown, while Magolor is transported to somewhere. With the Master Crown shattered and Magolor defeated, Kirby and friends return to Popstar, after a close call escaping the now collapsing Another Dimension. The Landia dragons take the Lor Starcutter and return home. The game’s Extra Mode, a harder version of the main story, replaces Magolor's final form with Magolor Soul, and reveals that Magolor’s body was taken over by the Master Crown.

== Development ==
Development on a new Kirby game for the GameCube began following the release of Kirby 64: The Crystal Shards for the Nintendo 64 in 2000. The game underwent an 11-year development cycle, in which three different proposed versions were developed and scrapped. The first version was similar to the graphical and gameplay style of Kirby 64, rendered in 3D, but using traditional 2D side-scrolling gameplay. The tentatively-titled Kirby for Nintendo GameCube would also support multiplayer with up to four players, featuring an expansion of the Helper system from Kirby Super Star. This build was demonstrated at E3 in 2005, and was set for release later that year. However, difficulty with programming multiplayer led to this version being scrapped, though the expanded Helper concept would resurface with Kirby Star Allies for the Nintendo Switch.

The second build placed Kirby in a 3D environment and had "extremely challenging" gameplay. It was canceled because it did not meet HAL Laboratory's quality standards. The third build returned to side-scrolling gameplay and featured Super Abilities; it had the graphical style of a pop-up book, similar to Yoshi's Story (1997). Shinya Kumazaki, who had directed Kirby Super Star Ultra, was brought on to direct the Wii project when the third build was canceled in early 2010. For the final version, the team began by developing a single-player game, then gradually reintroduced Super Abilities and four-player multiplayer. Development of the final version accelerated in October 2010, when the game began to take form.

Kirby's long development caused the game to frequently appear and then disappear from Nintendo's upcoming game lists. On September 14, 2006, the Kirby game appeared on a list of upcoming Wii games, tentatively named Hoshi no Kābī (星のカービィ, lit. "Kirby of the Stars"), set for release in Japan. The December 2006 issue of Nintendo Power removed Kirby from its list of GameCube releases, but did not place it on its list of Wii releases. Matt Casamassina of IGN, posting on his blog, furthered the idea of a Wii release by stating that it would indeed be released for the Wii in 2007. He compared it to Donkey Kong Barrel Blast, another game that was originally announced as a GameCube title, but eventually released on the Wii. While the game did not appear at E3 2007, Beth Llewelyn of Nintendo of America confirmed the game "had not been abandoned". The December 2007 issue of Official Nintendo Magazine claimed that a Kirby game for the Wii was not in development. On May 7, 2010, Nintendo confirmed that a Kirby Wii title was still in the making.

Nintendo announced the game Kirby's Epic Yarn at E3 2010, a separate title that was in development by Good-Feel. Some believed this to be the manifestation of the canceled Kirby game until Nintendo re-announced the game in January 2011, with a release date set within the same year. At E3 2011, the game was demonstrated in playable form under the tentative title Kirby Wii. The game was later renamed Kirby's Return to Dream Land in North America, Kirby's Adventure Wii in Europe and Australia, and Hoshi no Kirby Wii in Japan. The music was composed by Jun Ishikawa and Hirokazu Ando, with a soundtrack called Kirby Wii Music Selection featuring 45 musical pieces from the game.

== Remake ==
Kirby's Return to Dream Land Deluxe
- Developers: HAL Laboratory; Vanpool
- Publisher: Nintendo
- Director: Yutaka Watanabe
- Producers: Tadashi Kamitake; Jun Tsuda; Toyokazu Nonaka
- Programmers: Takashi Nozue; Yohei Fukuda
- Artist: Tsuyoshi Fujita
- Writer: Shinya Kumazaki
- Composers: Hirokazu Ando; Yuki Shimooka; Jun Ishikawa
- Series: Kirby
- Platform: Nintendo Switch
- Release: February 24, 2023
- Genre: Platform
- Modes: Single-player, multiplayer

During the Nintendo Direct on September 13, 2022, an enhanced remake was announced for the Nintendo Switch titled Kirby's Return to Dream Land Deluxe. Additions to the original include Mecha and Sand Abilities, the Festival ability from Kirby Star Allies, a comic book graphical style, revamped controls based on those introduced in Kirby: Triple Deluxe, and new sub-games, as well as some returning from past Kirby titles that did not appear in the original, though Scope Shot is excluded. During the Nintendo Direct on February 8, 2023, a new mode, Magolor Epilogue: The Interdimensional Traveler, was announced, in addition to a free demo of the game being released that same day. The game was released on February 24, 2023.

Magolor Epilogue: The Interdimensional Traveler stars Magolor after his defeat at the hands of Kirby and his friends. Stranded in the depths of Another Dimension and without most of his powers, Magolor sets out attempting to reclaim them while also collecting Fruit Fragments, parts of a mysterious fruit called the Gem Apple. He eventually repairs the Gem Apple Seed at the Ethereal Altar, but it is soon corrupted by the remnants of the Master Crown, becoming the Crowned Doomer. After its defeat, the Master Crown remnants combine with the Gem Apple, transforming into a massive tree-like being, known as the Tree Crown Without a Ruler. Magolor fights the Master Crown, and eventually defeats it for good by infusing a sword with his magic, turning it into an Ultra Sword, and slicing the Master Crown in half. Magolor then leaves Another Dimension through a dimensional rift that opens up after the Master Crown is defeated. The credits sequence reveals that via the portal, Magolor ends up in the village of the Dream Kingdom, which is located in an alternate universe, with the Gem Apple seed, now reduced to a sapling, being planted as the village's Gem Apple tree. Having now redeemed himself, Magolor takes up residence as the Dream Kingdom's shopkeeper, leading into the events of Team Kirby Clash Deluxe and Super Kirby Clash.

Kirby's Return to Dream Land Deluxe was the final game that Vanpool worked on before it shut down in May 2023, three months after the game's release; the company had previously worked with HAL Laboratory on multiple Kirby games for the Switch during its final years.

== Reception ==
Reception

Aggregate scores
Aggregator	Score
GameRankings	80.50%
Metacritic	77/100

Review scores
Publication	Score
1Up.com	B
Destructoid	10/10
Eurogamer	6/10
Famitsu	36/40
Game Informer	8.5/10
GameSpot	7.5/10
GamesRadar+	4.5/5
GameTrailers	8.3/10
IGN	7.5/10
Nintendo Life	9/10
Nintendo World Report	9/10

Kirby's Return to Dream Land received "generally favorable" reviews, based on review aggregator Metacritic. According to Nintendo, the game sold 1.31 million copies by March 2012.

Multiple critics appreciated the return of traditional Kirby gameplay, compared to unique content like Kirby's Epic Yarn. The game was called nostalgic and reminiscent of prior games, with James Stephanie Sterling of Destructoid describing it as "refreshing" and stating that "Kirby doesn't need to innovate, he just needs to be fun; Return to Dream Land brings the fun in spades." The graphics and visuals were praised for being detailed and vibrant. GameSpot reviewer Nathan Meunier called the levels beautifully designed, appreciating each one's environment.

Complaints were raised of how the game lacked difficulty, mostly from the use of multiplayer. IGN stated that the game could appeal to a younger audience with a simple difficulty level.

=== Kirby's Return to Dream Land Deluxe ===
Reception

Aggregate scores
Aggregator	Score
Metacritic	79/100
OpenCritic	79% recommend

Review scores
Publication	Score
Destructoid	9/10
Game Informer	8.75/10
GameSpot	7/10
IGN	7/10
Nintendo Life	9/10

Like the original, Kirby's Return to Dream Land Deluxe also received "generally favorable" reviews according to Metacritic, scoring slightly higher than the original. Fellow review aggregator OpenCritic assessed that the game received strong approval, being recommended by 79% of critics. Morgan Shaver of Shacknews stated that they liked the new Merry Magoland feature in the Switch remake, giving the overall game a positive review. The Switch remake sold 1.46 million copies as of March 2023.

== See also ==
- List of Kirby media
- List of Wii games
- List of platformers
- 2011 in video games
