= Monkey Barrels =

2019 video game

- Developer: Good-Feel
- Publishers: Justdan International; Nicalis
- Platforms: Nintendo Switch; Windows
- Release: Nintendo Switch; 7 November 2019; Windows; 9 February 2021
- Genre: Action game; adventure game
- Modes: Single-player, multiplayer

Monkey Barrels is a top-down shoot 'em up video game developed by Good-Feel. It was released for the Nintendo Switch on 7 November 2019. A port for Microsoft Windows was released in 2021.

== Gameplay ==
Monkey Barrels is a top-down shoot 'em up. Players must control monkeys and complete each stage defeating the enemies attacking from every side. The game supports the single-player mode and the online multi-player mode that supports up to six players. The player characters are controlled with twin-sticks. The game has 22 stages in various environments.

== Development and release ==
Monkey Barrels was developed by Good-Feel, a Japanese developer behind Nintendo-published games like Kirby's Epic Yarn, Yoshi's Woolly World, and Yoshi's Crafted World. The developer's president Etsunobu Ebisu said that, with Monkey Barrels he wanted to create a challenging game with the essence of an old-school arcade game. The developers combined the 3D rendering with classic pixel art to realize gaming experience that has a retro feel.

Monkey Barrels was first released internationally on the Nintendo Switch on 7 November 2019. Justdan International published a physical edition on 10 December 2020 in Japan. A western physical edition was published by Nicalis on 11 December.

The game was ported to Microsoft Windows and released on 9 February 2021, first via Epic Games Store. It was later released on Steam on September 26 by Nicalis.
