= Kirby's Epic Yarn =

2010 video game

- North American Wii box art
- Developer: Good-Feel
- Publisher: Nintendo
- Director: Kentaro Sei
- Producers: Etsunobu Ebisu; Yoichi Yamamoto; Nobuo Matsumiya
- Designer: Atsushi Kono
- Programmer: Hironori Kuraoka
- Artist: Kazumasa Yonetani
- Composers: Tomoya Tomita; Akihiro Juichiya; Soshiro Hokka (3DS); Tadashi Ikegami; Jun Ishikawa; Hirokazu Ando
- Series: Kirby
- Platforms: Wii; Nintendo 3DS
- Release: Wii; JP: October 14, 2010; NA: October 17, 2010; AU: February 24, 2011; EU: February 25, 2011; Nintendo 3DS; JP: March 7, 2019; WW: March 8, 2019
- Genre: Platform
- Modes: Single-player, multiplayer

Kirby's Epic Yarn (Note: Known in Japan as Yarn Kirby (Japanese: 毛糸のカービィ, Hepburn: Keito no Kābī)) is a 2010 platform game developed by Good-Feel and published by Nintendo for the Wii. It is an installment of the Kirby series and was released in October 2010 in Japan and North America and in February 2011 in Australia and Europe. It is the first entry in the Kirby series on a home video game console since 2003's Kirby Air Ride for the GameCube, and its first home console platform game since 2000's Kirby 64: The Crystal Shards for the Nintendo 64.

The game follows Kirby, who has been transformed into yarn and sent to Patch Land, a world made completely out of fabric. He must help Prince Fluff by collecting seven pieces of magic yarn that are used to stitch Patch Land together in order to stop the game's antagonist, Yin Yarn. Kirby's Epic Yarn utilizes a unique craft-based visual style; the game's characters and environments consist entirely of yarn, fabric, and other craft materials. Unlike most games in the Kirby series, Kirby is unable to inhale or fly, instead relying on the ability to morph into other objects, such as a parachute, a car, and a submarine, as well as larger objects such as a tank and a steam train.

The third game developed by Good-Feel in tandem with Nintendo, Kirby's Epic Yarn was originally proposed by Madoka Yamauchi, who came up with the idea of a "world of yarn" as a video game. It began development as "Keito no Fluff", a game starring Prince Fluff as the main protagonist, before the starring character was eventually switched to Kirby. The game's graphical style was created via digital images of real-life fabrics which were placed over polygons. The game's music was composed by Tomoya Tomita.

Before the game's release, Kirby's Epic Yarn won numerous awards at E3 2010 including Game of the Show from GameSpot. It was released later that year to largely positive reviews, receiving an Editor's Choice award from IGN, who ranked it as #95 in their "Top 100 Modern Games". As of April 2011, it has sold 1.59 million copies worldwide. It was re-released digitally via the Wii U eShop in Europe and Australia on May 21, 2015, in North America on July 28, 2016, and in Japan on August 9, 2016. A port of the game for the Nintendo 3DS entitled Kirby's Extra Epic Yarn (Note: Known in Japan as Yarn Kirby Plus (Japanese: 毛糸のカービィ プラス), Hepburn: Keito no Kābī Purasu)) was released on March 7, 2019. The port was the last game that Nintendo released for the console.

== Gameplay ==
Kirby's Epic Yarn features a unique graphical style, rendered in a knitted design based on animated yarn and a world of cloth and textiles.

Kirby's Epic Yarn is a sidescrolling platformer, played primarily with the Wii Remote held sideways. The player controls Kirby, who has been transformed into a character made of yarn; because of this, he is unable to inhale enemies or fly, unlike most games in the Kirby series. Instead, Kirby's moveset is based around his newfound ability to transform into different yarn-based objects; for instance, while in mid-air, Kirby can transform into a small parachute in order to fall more slowly, and he can turn into a weight to smash down towards the ground and crush enemies and other objects. Kirby can move faster by turning into an automobile while on the ground, and he transforms into a submarine when going underwater. Certain areas feature special transformations which give Kirby unique abilities, such as a giant missile-launching tank, a fire truck, and a steam train which rides across tracks drawn by the Wii Remote's pointer. Kirby's primary method of attack consists of a "yarn-whip" ability which he can use to grab enemies and other objects, allowing him to wind them up into small balls of yarn and throw them. Kirby can also use his whip to activate mechanisms, such as zips and pulleys, and swing on buttons. A second player can also join in the game, playing as Prince Fluff, who plays identically to Kirby, and assisting in controlling transformations.

Stages are filled with several collectible items, primarily assorted craft beads which Kirby can collect. Completing levels earns Kirby one of four different ranking medals (wood, bronze, silver or gold) depending on how many beads the player completed the level with. Kirby does not have health or extra lives and cannot die in levels, but he will lose some of his beads upon receiving damage or falling into bottomless pits. Beads can also be used to purchase furniture and wallpaper for Kirby's apartment, which the player can customise to their liking. Additional furniture, as well as music tracks, can be unlocked by finding treasure chests hidden in each level. By decorating other apartments with the right furniture, new tenants will move in, opening up bonus challenges such as time trials.

Levels are completed by reaching and ringing the bell at the end of each stage. Completing a level gives the player a patch, which is thrown in the map area in order to unlock the next stage. Beating a boss level with a gold rank earns the player a hidden patch, allowing them to unlock additional levels at the end of a world.

=== Visuals ===
Kirby's Epic Yarn features graphics rendered in a unique knitted design based on animated yarn and a world of cloth and textiles. The game works its visual style into the gameplay by creating interaction between the game and its graphical style, such as allowing Kirby to pull on buttons, stray threads and zips and spin balls of yarn to reveal hidden areas or alter the shape of the terrain.

== Plot ==
While walking through Dream Land, Kirby discovers a tomato on a bush and decides to eat it. Yin-Yarn, the evil sorcerer who held the tomato (revealed to be a Metamato), appears when he tries to inhale the Metamato into his stomach and magically banishes Kirby into Patch Land, a world completely made of fabric, via the sock carried around his neck. In Patch Land, Kirby's body transforms into yarn, rendering both his power to inhale and the ability to fly useless. Instead, Kirby is granted the ability to transform by the magic of the Metamato, which he uses to rescue a yarn boy who looks similar to Kirby from being attacked by a monster. The boy, named Prince Fluff, explains that Yin-Yarn has separated Patch Land into pieces, which was tied together by magic yarn. When they come across the first piece after defeating a monster that attacks the duo, Kirby decides to help Prince Fluff collect all seven pieces of the magic yarn and restore Patch Land.

Meanwhile, Yin-Yarn captures King Dedede and ambushes Meta Knight, placing them under his control, and begins to take over Dream Land in Kirby's absence. Kirby and Prince Fluff are forced to fight King Dedede and Meta Knight after they ambush them in Patch Land. When Kirby and Prince Fluff finally collect all seven pieces of the Magic Yarn and stitch Patch Land back together, Meta Knight, no longer under the sorcerer's influence, apologises for attacking the duo earlier while possessed and informs Kirby that Yin-Yarn is turning Dream Land into fabric. Prince Fluff produces the second sock, its magic fully restored by the seven pieces of the magic yarn, and uses it to transport Kirby, himself, Meta Knight, and Dedede back to Dream Land; now completely made of yarn. With Meta Knight's help, Kirby and Prince Fluff confront and defeat Yin-Yarn, breaking the spell and returning both Dream Land and everyone, including Kirby, Meta Knight, and Dedede back to normal. Prince Fluff parts ways with Kirby, stating that he can visit Patch Land anytime via Yin-Yarn's magic sock.

== Development ==
Kirby's Epic Yarn was developed by Good-Feel, and was the third game developed by them in conjunction with Nintendo, following the releases of Wario Land: Shake It and Looksley's Line Up. The idea of a "world of yarn" was proposed by Madoka Yamauchi, the Planning Section Manager of Good-Feel, and ideas for the game mechanics grew after the staff experimented with store-bought cloth. The game began development under the name Fluff's Epic Yarn (Japanese: Keito no Fluff, lit. Fluff of Yarn), featuring Prince Fluff as the main character. Good-Feel gradually became dissatisfied with the project, believing that its appeal wore thin; during the summer of 2009, Nintendo proposed that the game be altered and released as a title in the Kirby series, a change which Good-Feel was initially hesitant to make, but quickly grew to embrace. Prince Fluff remained a part of the final product as Kirby's partner. At least three months were spent focusing on Kirby's movements and character design. The game's development was overseen by HAL Laboratory's character production section, as well as Warpstar, Inc., a joint venture formed by Nintendo and HAL Laboratory to manage the Kirby intellectual property. To create an "authentic feel" for the cloth and textiles, the graphics were created by using digital photographs of fabric, which were textured onto polygons.

The game's soundtrack was scored mostly by Tomoya Tomita, while franchise regulars Tadashi Ikegami, Jun Ishikawa and Hirokazu Ando handled the musical reprises towards the end of the game. Owing to its storybook presentation, Tomita focused primarily on acoustic piano for the soundtrack, but because he was unfamiliar with playing piano, he first researched performance styles and techniques. As the original plot for the game involved a timid Prince Fluff searching for his lost mother, Tomita originally hoped to create a "new kind" of feeling introduced in the game's opening: soft and sweet, yet also sad and unsettled. However, the game turned out to be more conventional than he originally planned, so he changed direction to slightly richer arrangements; he felt that focusing solely on piano would become repetitive, so he also included symphonic pieces.

The sound team at HAL Laboratory, who only had a month to compose their part of the soundtrack, were impressed by Tomita's score and tried to match its style. Ando used live instruments such as ukulele and melodica to enhance the sound of his compositions. Ishikawa wished to surprise players with the final boss theme, so he composed it in his usual electronic style to contrast the acoustic sound established by Tomita.

Kirby's Epic Yarn was officially revealed at Nintendo's press conference at E3 2010, where it was announced to be released during the autumn that year.

=== Nintendo 3DS version ===
An enhanced port titled Kirby's Extra Epic Yarn was announced in a Nintendo Direct presentation on September 13, 2018, and was released in March 2019 for Nintendo 3DS. It was the final Nintendo-published game for the 3DS. The game features additional abilities, the new Devilish Mode and new sub-games. This port also features Amiibo support, as using any Kirby-related Amiibo figure will grant players new hats and abilities. Additional music was provided by Good-Feel composers Akihiro Juichiya and Soshiro Hokka.

== Reception ==
Kirby's (Extra) Epic Yarn

Aggregate scores
Aggregator	Score	
Aggregator	3DS	Wii
Metacritic	79/100	86/100
OpenCritic	72% recommend	N/A

Review scores
Publication	Score	
Publication	3DS	Wii
1Up.com	N/A	A−
Destructoid	7.5/10	9.5/10
Edge	N/A	8/10
Electronic Gaming Monthly	8.5/10	N/A
Eurogamer	N/A	8/10
Famitsu	N/A	36/40
Game Informer	N/A	9.5/10
GamePro	N/A	4/5
GameRevolution	N/A	B+
GameSpot	9/10	8.5/10
GameSpy	N/A	4.5/5
GamesRadar+	N/A	4.5/5
GamesTM	N/A	8/10
GameTrailers	N/A	8.4/10
GameZone	N/A	8.5/10
Giant Bomb	N/A	5/5
Hardcore Gamer	N/A	4.5/5
IGN	N/A	9/10
Jeuxvideo.com	15/20	N/A
Joystiq	N/A	4.5/5
Nintendo Life	9/10	10/10
Nintendo Power	N/A	8.5/10
Nintendo World Report	8.5/10	10/10
Official Nintendo Magazine	N/A	93%
PALGN	N/A	7.5/10
The Guardian	N/A	3/5
Video Games (DE)	N/A	86%
VideoGamer.com	N/A	9/10

=== Pre-release ===
Kirby's Epic Yarn received generally positive reception upon its reveal. It won numerous awards following its E3 2010 appearance, including the prestigious Game of the Show award from GameSpot and the G4 television show Reviews on the Run. GameSpot also nominated it for the Best Wii Game and Best Platformer and awarded it for Best Graphics, Artistic. The game received the award for Best Overall Game from Nintendo Life as well. Additionally, it won the Best Graphics award from GameTrailers, beating out notable contenders like Crysis 2, Killzone 3, and Gears of War 3. GameTrailers also awarded it the Best Platformer title. It was named Best Wii Game by 1UP.com, Nintendo World Report and Kotaku, and awarded Best Character Design by Kotaku as well.

GameRevolution editor Nick Tan praised Kirby's Epic Yarn (amongst other games) as a great revival, commenting that (unlike the other titles) it completely refashions the character Kirby. He compares the graphical style to Yoshi's Story, describing it as a "ball of whimsy" and calling it a "certified winner" of E3. Siliconera editor Jenni agreed, stating that she was excited to play the game after seeing its trailer, commenting that the game looked great on the HDTV she played it on. GamesRadar editor Brett Elston described Epic Yarn as the "cutest, most charming game" for the Wii. He commented that it was a relief to see something interesting in the series, describing recent titles such as Kirby Air Ride, Kirby: Squeak Squad, and Kirby Super Star Ultra as being stale.

While The Escapist editor Steve Butts was largely uninterested in Kirby's Epic Yarn in the face of bigger titles such as The Legend of Zelda: Skyward Sword, Donkey Kong Country Returns, and Metroid: Other M, he stated that after playing it, he felt that it was the strongest title amongst Nintendo's E3 lineup, citing the visual style and gameplay, but he noted that the game felt somewhat easy.

=== Post-release ===
Kirby's Epic Yarn received "generally favorable" reviews from critics, according to the review aggregation website Metacritic, where it is the highest-rated Kirby game. IGN gave the game an Editor's Choice award, calling it "an amazing looking game that embraces traditional platforming designs in fresh new ways." GameTrailers praised the game's presentation and imaginative gameplay, though criticizing the inability to die. GameSpot said that the game's "story levels are way too easy", but that the graphics and overall fun made up for its shortcomings. Kotaku gave the game an Editor's Choice award, calling it "a game designed for constant smiling, a side-scroller that will soothe the stressed." Nintendo World Report said that "the joyous platformer might not be difficult, but it's fun, inventive, and outrageously imaginative."

1UP.com praised the game for the creativity of the levels and the thematic visuals. Game Informer praised the game's artistic style as "one of the best-looking games on the Wii" and also noted both its ease of use for less experienced gamers and its challenges for more experienced gamers. Japanese gaming magazine Famitsu gave it a score of one nine, one eight, one nine, and one ten for a total of 36 out of 40. They said: "The game's not just about looking cute -- the way the gameplay takes advantage of this yarn world is brilliant. Even if you've encountered these sorts of obstacles in other action games, they seem fresh all over again here. It's a great action game, too, and if you try to get every item in the game, even veteran action fans will find it challenging. The whole package is stuffed full of fun and surprises. The graphics are unique and packed with originality. The game's set up so you never get a Game Over, but there's still enough optional hardcore aspects to it to keep all walks of gamers happy." Nintendo Power praised the game's concept, gameplay and graphics. Edge gave it a score of eight out of ten, saying, "Not since Yoshi's Island's designers broke out the crayons has a Nintendo platformer looked so much like a work of craft, but it's a pity that, for the most part, the levels don't feel as fresh as they look - a platform made of butterfly stitching is still just a platform."

The Escapist gave it a score of all five stars and called it "one of those games that you'll play simply because it makes you feel so good. It's also challenging and clever, with well done co-operative play and even a great soundtrack. There's no downside to this game." The A.V. Club gave it a B+ and said, "Drawbacks aside, adults should consult their doctors about a prescription of Epic Yarn instead of Prozac." The Daily Telegraph gave it eight out of ten, saying, "Players who simply wish to drink in the dreamy visuals and enjoy the cute characters will find Kirby's Epic Yarn a breezy and attractive way to while away six or so hours of their time." However, The Guardian gave it three stars out of five, saying, "Teenage boys will absolutely hate it. But when viewed as a platform game for kids, it's pretty impressive. Kirby first emerged in 1992; only now has his existence been justified."

Critics praised the soundtrack, which was described as "tranquil", "sugary sweet", "soothing", and "jazzy". The remixes of classic Kirby themes were also appreciated. However, GameTrailers and Jeremy Peeples of Hardcore Gamer felt that some of the tracks were too slow-paced and "sleepy", and GamesTM remarked that the music "rarely comes close to the orchestral majesty of the Galaxy games", but singled out the Melody Town level as the game's audio-visual highlight. The narration received mixed reactions. GameTrailers and Peeples likened its effect to a father reading his child a bedtime story; Peeples stated that the narrator only slightly altering his voice for each character was "a clever approach that works well to not only tell the tale, but also give the characters a voice without giving them a definitive voice - a problem in other Nintendo games". While David Sanchez of GameZone and Corbie Dillard of Nintendo Life deemed the approach fitting for the game's light-hearted tone, Dillard noted that the narrator "tends to overdo it a bit", Sanchez admitted that the result sounded "cheesy", and James Stephanie Sterling of Destructoid compared the narrator to a "creepy uncle".

Kirby's Epic Yarn won GameSpy's 2010 Platforming Game of the Year award, and Giant Bomb's 2010 Best Looking Game award. It was the runner-up for Nintendo World Report's 2010 Wii Game of the Year award. At 2011 Game Developers Choice Awards, Kirby's Epic Yarn was nominated for the Innovation award. During the 14th Annual Interactive Achievement Awards, Kirby's Epic Yarn was nominated for Family Game of the Year, Outstanding Achievement in Art Direction and Outstanding Achievement in Gameplay Engineering. IGN ranked the game #95 in Top 100 Modern Games in 2011.

The game was the 2nd highest-selling game from October 11 to October 17, selling 92,280 copies. As of March 2011, Kirby's Epic Yarn had sold 1.59 million copies worldwide. It went on to reach 1.85 million copies sold worldwide.

The Nintendo 3DS version, Kirby's Extra Epic Yarn, received positive reviews, with a score of 79 on Metacritic. It sold 10,000 copies within its first week in Japan, with sales being relatively slow due to the game releasing near the tail end of the handheld's lifespan. Criticisms were leveled at inelegantly introduced copy abilities in levels that weren't designed for them, while praise was awarded to the game for retaining the same aesthetic and charm as the original.

== Spiritual successor ==
In a Nintendo Direct broadcast in January 2013, Nintendo announced a new, visually similar spiritual successor called Yoshi's Woolly World. Released for the Wii U in 2015 and later the 3DS in 2017, the game instead features Yoshi as the protagonist and offers amiibo compatibility. Good-Feel once again returned to develop the game.
