= Takayuki Ikeda =

Japanese businessman

- Occupations: Company president, chief executive officer (CEO), representative director, video game designer
- Known for: Toshiba (Toshiba Tec Corporation)
- Notable work: Super Princess Peach

Takayuki Ikeda is the President, CEO, and Representative Director of Toshiba Tec Corporation, a subsidiary of Toshiba. He has been credited with creating the concept for the video game Super Princess Peach.

At Toshiba, he previously served in a number of other roles.
