= Jun Ishikawa (composer) =

Japanese composer (born 1964)

- 石川 淳
- Born: 1964 (age 61–62); Chiba Prefecture, Japan
- Other name: Mushio Funazawa
- Education: Nihon University
- Occupations: Composer; musician
- Years active: 1986–present
- Employer: HAL Laboratory (1990–2023)
- Musical career
- Genres: Video game music; chiptune; electronic; synthpop; techno
- Instruments: Piano; synthesizer

Jun Ishikawa (石川 淳, Ishikawa Jun; born 1964), sometimes known as Mushio Funazawa, is a Japanese composer. Along with Hirokazu Ando, Ishikawa is best known for composing for the Kirby video game series. He left series studio HAL Laboratory in 2023 but has continued to compose for Kirby games.

== Early life ==
Ishikawa started taking piano lessons aged 3-4, but felt he could never become good at it despite practice. Later, he discovered artists such as Paul Mauriat, Isao Tomita, Kraftwerk, Yellow Magic Orchestra, and Brian Eno. He also purchased a Roland SH-2, as he wanted fellow students to get into Tomita's music, but the synth was the cheapest he could afford. Later he attended Nihon University's College of Art, studying film music. As a student, he gained experience with recording and mixing for a theater, while occasionally writing what he considered to be poor pieces of music.

== HAL Laboratory ==
Ishikawa worked at two companies prior to joining HAL Laboratory. He eventually found an advertisement for a sound creator job at HAL; although he had not previously heard of this profession before, he decided to apply for it, which led to him joining in 1990. His first work was composing one track and sound effects for Uchuu Keibitai SDF, along with senior composer Hideki Kanazashi who had already written most of the music prior to Ishikawa joining. He was not directly taught how to write music for the Nintendo Entertainment System, so he had to watch Kanazashi doing so. Kanazashi left HAL just two weeks after Ishikawa joined. His experience with composing for the NES led to him scoring the Game Boy game Kirby's Dream Land in 1992, which established the direction the music of later games would take. He intentionally wrote simple melodies and chords, feeling that complex chords did not sound good on the Game Boy's speakers.

The previous year, composer Hirokazu Ando also joined HAL after sending a demo track; Ishikawa was impressed and met with him before joining the company. He felt that Ando's style was not much different from his own. After Ando was given an exercise to write a track using NES tools, he served as the lead composer of Kirby's Adventure in 1993, and went on to compose for several future titles in the franchise, frequently working with Ishikawa and other sound team composers.

Ishikawa also composed for Kirby Super Star in 1996, feeling that the ideas in the tracks he wrote were what he had always imagined would fit in certain settings. For Kirby's Dream Land 3, Ishikawa decided to incorporate influences from contemporary genres such as techno and drum'n'bass, wishing to evolve the franchise's sound further. Seniors at the company did not initially understand the soundtrack's shift in musical style, although then-HAL president Satoru Iwata did not object to it, which relieved Ishikawa. Kirby: Canvas Curse also featured a change in sound direction, with the music incorporating elements of glitch. The final stage music originally had nearly inaudible notes and no melody, but because testers believed the distorted music to be a bug, it was tweaked to have a more discernible melody.

In 2010, he contributed additional tracks to Kirby's Epic Yarn along with Ando and Tadashi Ikegami. HAL were only given a month to compose additional tracks for the game. He tried to make the tracks fit with those of lead composer Tomoya Tomita, which had already been completed at the time; however, he composed the final boss theme in his typical style to surprise players.

As well as the Kirby series, Ishikawa and Ando have also composed for the BoxBoy! series, which features chiptune-inspired music. In 2018, he composed for Kirby Star Allies along with Ando and newcomer Yuuta Ogasawara. Creating the sound effects involved trial and error; some of the sound effects he created were also made using nutrition drink bottles and cans. The final game that he composed music for while working at HAL was Kirby's Return to Dream Land Deluxe.

Ishikawa prefers to keep a low profile and runs for cover when asked in interviews to pose for photos. He has stated that this attitude is a result of his discipline from being at school while studying film music. His first public appearance was in an Iwata Asks interview for Kirby's Epic Yarn in 2010. In 2017 he did a speech at the Kirby 25th Anniversary Orchestra Concert, along with fellow HAL composers. In 2022, arrangements of the team's music were performed at Kirby 30th Anniversary Music Festival, which was streamed on YouTube. The composers also performed a medley of King Dedede's theme songs under the name HAL Laboratory Dream Band, with Ishikawa on keyboards, Ando on bass, Ogasawara on drums, Ikegami on saxophone, Megumi Ohara on keyboards and flute, and Shogo Sakai on guitar. The composers commented their thoughts about the festival on the promotional video posted prior to it, with Ishikawa feeling that his tracks were usually not written with the intention to be performed live.

== Freelance work ==
Outside of HAL Laboratory, Ishikawa has produced work using the alias Mushio Funazawa since the mid-1980s, creating several albums, composing for butoh performances, and performing live electronic improvisations. During the late 90s, Ishikawa reflected positively on his job at HAL, deeming it rewarding and for providing the majority of his income, but also feared of judgement from others for working on game music.

Ishikawa left HAL Laboratory in April 2023. He continues to compose music for the Kirby series as a freelancer, with his first freelance game work being Kirby and the Forgotten Land - Nintendo Switch 2 Edition + Star-Crossed World in 2025. Using his Mushio Funazawa alias, he also composed for the game Mr. Elevator later in the same year. Director Takashi Hamada specifically asked Ishikawa to create music in the style of his Mushio Funazawa work, using a modular synth as well as FM synthesis.

== Musical style ==
Ishikawa's music often features electronic elements, as well as an emphasis on melodies and fast tempos. His music sometimes incorporates unusual time signatures, although Ishikawa has stated that this may result from experimenting with a sequencer, rather than intending to be eccentric. While he is fond of modular synths, he does not use them in his game music due to regarding them as inconvenient for creating music. As his tracks are written for the purposes of entertaining players, he never thinks about how they would sound performed live, and has also admitted that he would not be able to perform most of his own game compositions live.

He has cited Paul Mauriat, Isao Tomita, Kraftwerk, Yellow Magic Orchestra, and Brian Eno as being among his musical influences.

== Legacy ==
Fellow Kirby composer Hirokazu Ando has named Ishikawa as being a huge influence on his own compositions for the franchise. Max Coburn has also listed both Ishikawa and Ando as being among his favorite video game composers.

In 2021, a cover of Ishikawa's composition, "Meta Knight's Revenge" from Kirby Super Star, performed by the 8-Bit Big Band featuring Button Masher, won a Grammy Award for Best Arrangement, Instrumental or A Cappella. The arrangers, Charlie Rosen and Jake Silverman thanked Ishikawa for his music during the acceptance speech.

== Works ==
=== Video games ===
Year	Title	Notes	Ref.
1990	Adventures of Lolo 3	Music with Hideki Kanazashi	
1990	New Ghostbusters II	Music	
1991	HAL's Hole in One Golf	Music	
1991	HyperZone	Music	
1992	Arcana	Music with Hirokazu Ando	
1992	Kirby's Dream Land	Music	
1993	Alcahest	Music	
1996	Kirby Super Star	Music	
1997	Kirby's Dream Land 3	Music	
1998	Kirby's Super Star Stacker	Music with Hirokazu Ando	
2000	Kirby 64: The Crystal Shards	Music with Hirokazu Ando	
2002	Kirby: Nightmare in Dream Land	Music with Hirokazu Ando, Tadashi Ikegami, and Shogo Sakai	
2003	Kirby Air Ride	Music with Hirokazu Ando, Tadashi Ikegami, and Shogo Sakai	
2005	Kirby: Canvas Curse	Music with Tadashi Ikegami	
2006	Common Sense Training	Music with Hirokazu Ando and Tadashi Ikegami	
2006	Kirby: Squeak Squad	Music with Hirokazu Ando, Tadashi Ikegami, and Shogo Sakai	
2008	Kirby Super Star Ultra	Music with Hirokazu Ando	
2009	Picross 3D	Music with Yasumasa Yamada and Hirokazu Ando	
2010	Kirby's Epic Yarn	Music with Tomoya Tomita, Hirokazu Ando, and Tadashi Ikegami	
2011	Kirby's Return to Dream Land	Music with Hirokazu Ando	
2012	Kirby's Dream Collection	Music with Hirokazu Ando and Shogo Sakai	
2014	Kirby: Triple Deluxe	Music with Hirokazu Ando	
2015	BoxBoy!	Music with Hirokazu Ando	
2016	BoxBoxBoy!	Music with Hirokazu Ando	
2016	Kirby: Planet Robobot	Music with Hirokazu Ando	
2017	Bye-Bye BoxBoy!	Music with Hirokazu Ando	
2017	Team Kirby Clash Deluxe	Music with Hirokazu Ando	
2017	Kirby's Blowout Blast	Music with Hirokazu Ando	
2018	Kirby Star Allies	Music with Hirokazu Ando and Yuuta Ogasawara	
2019	BoxBoy! + BoxGirl!	Music with Hirokazu Ando and Yuuta Ogasawara	
2019	Super Kirby Clash	Music with Kiyoshi Hazemoto, Hirokazu Ando, and Tadashi Ikegami	
2020	Kirby Fighters 2	Music with Kiyoshi Hazemoto, Hirokazu Ando, and Yuki Shimooka	
2022	Kirby and the Forgotten Land	Music with various others (Note: Hirokazu Ando, Yuuta Ogasawara, Yuki Shimooka, and Tadashi Ikegami)	
2022	Kirby's Dream Buffet	Music with various others (Note: Shogo Sakai, Hirokazu Ando, Megumi Ohara, and Yuki Shimooka)	
2025	Kirby and the Forgotten Land + Star-Crossed World	Music with various others (Note: Yuki Kato, Megumi Ohara, Hirokazu Ando, Yuki Shimooka, Shogo Sakai, and Momo Kodama)	
2025	Mr. Elevator	Music	

=== Other ===
Year	Title	Notes	Ref.
2003	Kirby: Right Back at Ya! (episodes 72-100)	Music with various others (Note: Akira Miyagawa, Hayata Akashi, Hirokazu Ando, Shogo Sakai, and Tadashi Ikegami)	
2008	TV no Tomo Channel	Music	
2016	The Sound of Kirby Café	Music with Hirokazu Ando, Megumi Ohara, and Shogo Sakai	
2019	The Sound of Kirby Café 2	Music with various others (Note: Hirokazu Ando, Yuuta Ogasawara, Megumi Ohara, Shogo Sakai, and Yuki Shimooka)	
