= Alcahest (video game) =

1993 video game

- Developer: HAL Laboratory
- Publisher: Square
- Director: Atsushi Kakuta
- Producer: Satoru Iwata
- Designer: Atsushi Kakuta
- Programmer: Hiroaki Suga
- Artist: R. Ishida
- Composer: Jun Ishikawa
- Platform: Super Famicom
- Release: JP: December 17, 1993
- Genre: Action
- Mode: Single-player

Alcahest (Note: Japanese: アルカエスト, Hepburn: Arukaesuto) is a 1993 action video game developed by HAL Laboratory and published by Square for the Super Famicom. The plot takes place in a world where an emperor leads his army towards conquest of the kingdom of Panakeia in the midst of the revival of the demon god Alcahest, who was previously defeated by a swordsman aided with the power of guardians. The player acts as the swordsman Alen, exploring and searching for items and power-ups, while fighting enemies and bosses. Throughout the journey, the player encounters guardians who help Alen with their power and allies who join his party to stop Alcahest.

The game was directed and designed by Atsushi Kakuta, with Satoru Iwata serving as producer. The soundtrack was composed by Jun Ishikawa, known for his work on the Kirby franchise. HAL intended to publish it under the name Guardian Blade, but the company ran into financial issues. Square changed the name to Alcahest and published the game, and its release was accompanied by a strategy guide. Although it was not officially published outside Japan, an English fan translation was released in 2002.

Alcahest garnered generally favorable reception from critics who reviewed it as an import title; praise was given to the graphics for eschewing the super deformed style prevalent on Super Famicom, balance between action and adventure, variety of companions, arcade-style gameplay, and combat system. Some reviewers expressed mixed opinions regarding the music, while criticism was geared towards the scenario, lack of proper interactions between characters, puzzles, repetition, and short length.

== Gameplay ==
Alen attacking enemies using the fire Guardian Blade with princess Elikshil as a companion

Alcahest is an arcade-style game played from a top-down perspective similar to titles like Gauntlet (1985), The Legend of Zelda, Dungeon Explorer, and Soul Blazer. The book A Guide to Japanese Role-Playing Games describes it as an action game in role-playing (RPG) clothing. The plot takes place in a world where an emperor leads his army towards conquest of the kingdom of Panakeia in the midst of the revival of the demon god Alcahest, who was previously defeated a thousand years ago by a swordsman aided with the power of guardians. Babilom, an envoy from hell, seeks to prevent the swordsman's reincarnation before reaching his full potential.

The player acts as the swordsman Alen across eight stages filled with a variety of blocks that propel him forward or send him leaping to another area, exploring and searching for items and power-ups, while fighting enemies and bosses. During the journey to stop Alcahest, the player encounters allies who join Alen's party one at a time. They are the wizard Garstein, the princess Elikshil, the knight Sirius, the cyborg Magna, and the shape-shifting dragon goddess Nevis. Allies attack and use special powers, but they cannot be controlled directly and special points (SP) are required for their special move.

The player attacks enemies using a blade given to Alen by the guardians. Alen can also perform dash attacks while running and block enemy projectiles by standing still with his shield. After fights against specific bosses, the player gains the abilities of one of the four guardians based on the classical elements. Alen can charge his blade for a special attack, which differs depending on the elemental ability selected. Magic points (MP) are used to summon guardians in battle and the player can switch between each one. Alen gains experience points (EXP) by defeating enemies and the player earns an additional continue after obtaining pre-determined scores to keep playing. The game is over once Alen's vitality is depleted, but the player can resume their progress via passwords given at the start of each stage.

== Development and release ==
Alcahest was developed by HAL Laboratory, known for their work on the Kirby franchise. The game was directed and designed by Atsushi Kakuta, with Satoru Iwata serving as producer. Hiroaki Suga acted as chief programmer, while character visuals were done by artist R. Ishida. The soundtrack was composed by Jun Ishikawa, known for his work on the Kirby series. Ishikawa's music emphasises action and a light adventurous feel. HAL intended to publish it under the name Guardian Blade, (Note: ガーディアンブレード (Gādian Burēdo)) but the company ran into financial problems. Square, renowned for the Final Fantasy franchise, changed the name to Alcahest and published the game for the Super Famicom on December 17, 1993. The release was accompanied by a strategy guide published by NTT Publishing. Although it was not officially published outside Japan, an English fan translation was released in 2002 by Frank Hughes (F.H.), which was later revised and corrected in 2014. In 2017, the game's main theme was included as part of a compilation album published by Hyperdub.

== Reception ==
Reception

Review scores
Publication	Score
Computer and Video Games	76%
Famitsu	7/10, 7/10, 7/10, 6/10
Jeuxvideo.com	15/20
Joypad	90%
Nintendo Life	8/10
Official Nintendo Magazine	79/100
Super Game Power	4.0/5
Super Play	69%
Super Console	79/100

Alcahest received generally favorable reception from critics who reviewed it as an import title. It received a 21.2 out of 30 score in a public poll taken by Family Computer Magazine. Electronic Gaming Monthly's Terri Aki regarded it as a great counterpart to Square's Final Fantasy II and Secret of Mana. Joypad's Jean-François Morisse lauded its audiovisual presentation, balance between action and adventure, variety of companions, and combat system reminiscent of Soul Blader but noted that while the Japanese text can be an issue, it does not prevent going through all the levels. Super Play's Tony Mott commended the game's graphics, gameplay, and level design, but criticized aspects such as the puzzles and lack of proper interactions between characters.

Gary Harrod and Rob Bright of Nintendo Magazine System (Official Nintendo Magazine) gave Alcahest positive remarks for its graphical department, sound effects and enjoyable gameplay, but felt that the music did not convey an atmosphere and criticized the repetitive action. Computer and Video Games made positive comments about its varied visuals and sprites, sound effects, and gameplay, but criticized the music and repetitiveness. Super Game Power's Roberto Carnicelli highlighted the game's intense action and graphics, while Piefranco Merenda and Massimiliano Diaco of Super Console commended its playability and challenge due to multiple difficulty levels but criticized the musical score.

Retro Gamer noted the game's blend of action and role-playing elements, partner mechanic, and accessibility due to the light use of Japanese. Zashy of Jeuxvideo.com commended its diverse level design, intuitive gameplay, as well as the guardians and allies for adding diversification into enemy encounters, but felt mixed regarding the music and criticized its short length, scenario and repetitive dungeons. Nintendo Life's Gonçalo Lopes praised Alcahest for its intuitive controls, arcade-style gameplay, Jun Ishikawa's music, and visuals for eschewing the super deformed style prevalent on Super Famicom.
