= Good-Feel =

Japanese video game developer

Good-Feel Co., Ltd.
- Type: Private
- Industry: Video games
- Founded: October 3, 2005; 21 years ago
- Founder: Etsunobu Ebisu, Shigeharu Umezaki
- Headquarters: Osaki, Shinagawa, Tokyo, Japan
- Number of locations: 3
- Key people: Shigeharu Umezaki (Chairman); Etsunobu Ebisu (President & CEO); Yoshikazu Isono (Managing Director)
- Number of employees: 172 (2026)
- Website: www.good-feel.co.jp

Good-Feel Co., Ltd. (株式会社グッド・フィール, Kabushiki gaisha Guddo Fīru) (stylized as GoödFeël) is a Japanese video game developer. Its main focus had been educational games for young children and adults on the Nintendo DS before expanding into console video games.

In 2008, the company became the developer for Wario Land: Shake It! on the Wii, which marked Good-Feel's first entry into the home console market. Since this release, Good-Feel has maintained a close relationship with Nintendo, developing games starring Kirby, Yoshi, and Princess Peach. It has also released several self-published games.

== History ==
Good-Feel was founded by Shigeharu Umezaki and Etsunobu Ebisu, former employees of Konami who worked on Castlevania and Goemon titles. The company started in Hyōgo Prefecture, Japan, in 2005 and opened a production facility in Tokyo in the same year. Its initial releases consisted of educational games.

They went to Nintendo and asked to work on a game. Long-time Nintendo employee Takahiro Harada asked Ebisu if he would like to make a new Wario Land. The development resulted in Wario Land: Shake It!, a 2D platform game released in 2008 with hand-drawn graphics made with the help of the animation studios Production I.G and Kusanagi.

Good-Feel worked with Nintendo again to release Kirby's Epic Yarn, a yarn-themed entry of the Kirby franchise. The game had initially been conceived as an original title called Fluff's Epic Yarn, but by the summer of 2009, Nintendo directed the team to shift the project to incorporate Kirby. HAL Laboratory and Warpstar were brought on to help manage the character. The game was released in 2010. It was later ported to the Nintendo 3DS as Kirby's Extra Epic Yarn in 2019. The game added power-ups, mini-games, and a new game mode.

The company next worked on Wii Play: Motion in 2011, developing the Skip Skimmer and Veggie Guardin’ mini-games. Nintendo and Good-Feel next announced the wool-themed Yoshi's Woolly World for the Nintendo Wii U in June 2014. It also included a two-player co-op mode. The developers created real wool items in order to make in-game assets. The game released in 2015. It was ported to the 3DS as Poochy and Yoshi’s Woolly World in 2017.

Good-Feel released Yoshi's Crafted World in March 2019. The developers turned to Unreal Engine to give the game its cardboard cutout and craft style. In October 2019, it announced Monkey Barrels, the company's first self-published title and its first game in over a decade to not be published by Nintendo. A physical release was produced the following year. Monkey Barrels was released in November 2019 for Nintendo Switch. A Microsoft Windows version was released on February 9, 2021.

In October 2020 interview with Famitsu, Good-Feel revealed it was opening an office in Osaka and working on an unnamed project set in Japan. On November 30, 2023, Good-Feel launched Otogi Katsugeki Mameda no Bakeru: Oracle Saitarou no Sainan!! for the Nintendo Switch in Japan. Billed as a spiritual successor to the Goemon series, it stars a tanuki disguised as a human who uses a drum to defeat enemies. The game was released worldwide for Switch and PC in September 2024 as Bakeru. The developers added new attacks, increased the game's speed, and added new enemies for the release. A physical edition for North America and Europe was released in February 2025.

In March 2024, Good-Feel released Princess Peach: Showtime!, the first game to star Princess Peach since 2005's Super Princess Peach. It was the first time in 25 years that Ebisu served as director.

== Games developed ==
Year	Game	Publisher	System	Ref.
2007	Training Words	Educational Network Inc.	Nintendo DS	
2008	Training Quiz	Benesse Corporation	Nintendo DS	
2008	Sense Training: Shape Space	Benesse Corporation	Nintendo DS	
2008	Wario Land: Shake It!	Nintendo	Wii	
2009	English Training	Educational Network Inc.	Nintendo DS	
2010	Looksley's Line Up	Nintendo	Nintendo DSi	
2010	Kirby's Epic Yarn	Nintendo	Wii	
2011	Wii Play: Motion (2 mini-games)	Nintendo	Wii	
2013	StreetPass Squad (NA: Mii Force)	Nintendo	Nintendo 3DS	
2013	Mario & Luigi: Dream Team (giant battles)	Nintendo	Nintendo 3DS	
2015	Yoshi's Woolly World	Nintendo	Wii U	
2015	StreetPass Zombies (NA: Battleground Z)	Nintendo	Nintendo 3DS	
2016	StreetPass Slot Car (NA: Slot Car Rivals)	Nintendo	Nintendo 3DS	
2016	StreetPass Traders (NA: Market Crashers)	Nintendo	Nintendo 3DS	
2016	Miitopia (support work)	Nintendo	Nintendo 3DS	
2017	Poochy & Yoshi's Woolly World	Nintendo	Nintendo 3DS	
2019	Kirby's Extra Epic Yarn	Nintendo	Nintendo 3DS	
2019	Yoshi's Crafted World	Nintendo	Nintendo Switch	
2019	Monkey Barrels	Good-Feel; Justdan (JP physical); Nicalis (NA physical)	Nintendo Switch; Microsoft Windows	
2023	Bakeru	Good-Feel (JP); Spike Chunsoft (WW)	Nintendo Switch; Microsoft Windows	
2024	Princess Peach: Showtime!	Nintendo	Nintendo Switch	
2026	Yoshi and the Mysterious Book	Nintendo	Nintendo Switch 2	

== See also ==
- Suzak
- Eighting
- Nintendo Cube
- Dimps
- TOSE
