= Princess Peach: Showtime! =

2024 video game

- Game icon showing Peach in her various transformations
- Developer: Good-Feel
- Publisher: Nintendo
- Director: Etsunobu Ebisu
- Producer: Etsunobu Ebisu
- Composers: Soshiro Hokkai; Yuki Minami; Taichi Tada
- Series: Mario
- Engine: Unreal Engine 4
- Platform: Nintendo Switch
- Release: March 22, 2024
- Genre: Action-adventure
- Mode: Single-player

Princess Peach: Showtime! (Note: Japanese: プリンセスピーチ Showtime!, Hepburn: Purinsesu Pīchi Shōtaimu!) is a 2024 action-adventure game developed by Good-Feel and published by Nintendo. The game was released for the Nintendo Switch on March 22, 2024. It is the first game to feature Princess Peach as the main protagonist since Super Princess Peach (2005).

The game received mixed reviews from critics, who praised its visuals, story, and soundtrack but criticized its repetitive gameplay, lack of depth, low difficulty, and technical issues. The game sold 1.22 million copies within 10 days.

== Gameplay ==
A gameplay screenshot showcasing the theater setting of the game

Princess Peach: Showtime! is an action-adventure game. The player controls Princess Peach and has the ability to interact with objects and characters with the help of a sentient ribbon named Stella. By standing on a circular platform, Peach will gain special abilities to fit each play's setting. Peach's transformations include Swordfighter Peach, Patissiere Peach, Ninja Peach, Cowgirl Peach, Figure Skater Peach, Detective Peach, Dashing Thief Peach, Mighty Peach, Mermaid Peach, and Kung Fu Peach, each with unique abilities. Peach's health is measured through five hearts, but an additional three hearts can be granted for easier difficulty by equipping the optional Heart Charm power-up. It is also possible to unlock skins (called "Ribbons") for Peach and Stella by rescuing a Theet named Ribboner in each of the game's levels, playing a "Rehearsal" challenge, or using Sparkle Gems, which act as the game's currency.

== Plot ==
One of Princess Peach's Toads receives a flyer advertising plays at the Sparkle Theater. Intrigued, Peach decides to attend the theater, accompanied by two of her Toads. As they arrive, a wicked sorceress named Grape and her minions, the Sour Bunch, invade and take over the theater, trapping many visitors inside the building, including Peach, who loses her crown during the commotion. Peach then meets Stella, the Sparkle Theater's guardian, and agrees to help her restore the theater. Making their way throughout all of the different plays, Peach and Stella work to rescue the Sparklas, who are the stars of all of the theater's plays.

After rescuing all of the Sparklas from the Sour Bunch, Peach assumes the form of Radiant Peach and confronts Grape at the theater's bottom floor, where the latter is eventually reduced to nothing more than her mask. However, Grape regains power and transforms into a giant version of herself, destroying the theater in the process. With support from the Theets, Peach and Stella resume battling Grape and eventually defeat her before restoring the theater to its original state. During the credits sequence, Peach performs with the Sparklas and reunites with the Toads, who give her crown back.

== Development ==
During the June 21, 2023 Nintendo Direct, Nintendo announced a new game centered around Princess Peach was in development and would be released for the Switch in 2024. The September 14, 2023 Direct revealed more details about the game, including its title, Peach's sidekick Stella, the first few transformations, the main villains Grape and the Sour Bunch, and a release date of March 22, 2024. The game uses the Unreal Engine 4 game engine.

On October 12, 2023, news outlets noted that the game's box art and key artwork had been changed to give Peach more determined facial expressions, which have been compared to her appearance in The Super Mario Bros. Movie. Shigeru Miyamoto would later confirm in an interview with Famitsu that the movie and Princess Peach: Showtime! were developed "around the same time” and that Peach’s “energetic” portrayal in the game influenced her characterization in the movie.

The game's development company was not officially revealed until March 21, 2024, when it was discovered via credits that Good-Feel was the developer and that the game was directed by Etsunobu Ebisu. Good-Feel's involvement with the game was leaked from its demo code two weeks prior.

== Reception ==
Reception

Aggregate scores
Aggregator	Score
Metacritic	74/100
OpenCritic	60% recommend (Note: Based on 106 reviews)

Review scores
Publication	Score
Destructoid	8/10
Digital Trends	3/5
Eurogamer	4/5
Famitsu	8/10, 8/10, 9/10, 8/10
Game Informer	7.5/10
GameSpot	7/10
GamesRadar+	3.5/5
IGN	7/10
Nintendo Life	8/10
NME	3/5
PCMag	3.5/5
Shacknews	7/10
The Guardian	2/5
Video Games Chronicle	4/5
VG247	5/5

Princess Peach: Showtime! received "mixed or average" reviews from critics, according to review aggregator website Metacritic. Fellow review aggregator OpenCritic assessed that the game received strong approval, being recommended by 60% of critics. In Japan, four critics from Famitsu gave the game a total score of 33 out of 40.

IGN's Logan Plant gave the game a 7 out of 10, praising its variety with the stage play, story, costumes, and music, while also praising its bosses as "strong suits". However, he criticized the completion aspect, commenting that the levels were rather long due to the cutscenes. Plant also raised concerns about the graphics and framerate, saying that Peach's model was rather "blurry" at times, and found that the loading screens also lagged slightly. In the end, he applauded the game for putting more emphasis on Peach and enjoyed the genres available.

GamesRadar+'s Dustin Bailey also liked the variety in stage design, praising one of the levels as "the type of mystery the player would be solving in the vein of a classic point-and-click adventure game". He also stated that the game did not have much replay value.

In a more critical review, The Guardian disliked the game's repetition, calling it "paper-thin". They also considered the game rather "shallow", saying that some of the game's ideas felt like they were "prototypes which escaped Nintendo headquarters". Their more positive notes included the ice-skating levels and kung-fu vignette adding appeal.

=== Sales ===
Princess Peach: Showtime! was the best-selling game in Japan during the week of March 18–24, 2024, selling 77,562 physical copies. The game remained at number one in the country the following week. Between April 1 and April 28, it was the third best-selling game in Japan. In May, the game was the ninth best-selling physical title in the country.

In the United Kingdom, Princess Peach: Showtime! debuted at number three for the week of March 26, 2024. The following week, the game ranked at number four in the country. In the United States, Princess Peach: Showtime! was the sixth best-selling title of March 2024, excluding digital sales

Princess Peach: Showtime! sold 1.22 million copies, which it achieved in 10 days. As of June 30, 2024, it has sold over 1.30 million copies.

=== Awards ===
Princess Peach: Showtime! was nominated for "Best Family Game" at The Game Awards 2024. The game was also nominated for four NAVGTR Awards for Artistic Animation, Camera Direction in a Game Engine, Franchise Family Game, and won the award for Franchise Original Light Music Score.

== Other media ==
A limited-time Spirit Board event themed around Princess Peach: Showtime! was held in Super Smash Bros. Ultimate from March 22 to March 26, 2024. The event featured new spirits based on Princess Peach: Showtime! alongside spirits from Super Mario Bros. Wonder. A Tetris 99 Maximus Cup themed around Princess Peach: Showtime! was later held from April 5 to April 8. Players who participated in the event could unlock a special in-game theme based on Princess Peach: Showtime!. A limited-time event was also held in Super Mario Run from March 22 to May 7, featuring missions based on Princess Peach: Showtime!. Players could complete the missions to obtain in-game statues depicting Princess Peach in several of her transformed outfits, which could be used to decorate their kingdoms.
