= Kirby 64: The Crystal Shards =

2000 platform video game by Nintendo

- North American box art
- Developer: HAL Laboratory
- Publisher: Nintendo
- Director: Shinichi Shimomura
- Producers: Masayoshi Tanimura; Hiroaki Suga; Kenji Miki
- Programmer: Teruyuki Gunji
- Composers: Jun Ishikawa; Hirokazu Ando
- Series: Kirby
- Platform: Nintendo 64
- Release: JP: March 24, 2000; NA: June 26, 2000; EU: June 22, 2001
- Genre: Platform
- Modes: Single-player, multiplayer

Kirby 64: The Crystal Shards (Note: Known in Japan as Hoshi no Kirby 64 (Japanese: 星のカービィ64, Hepburn: Hoshi no Kābī Rokujūyon; lit. "Kirby of the Stars 64")) is a 2000 platform game developed by HAL Laboratory and published by Nintendo for the Nintendo 64 (N64). It is the first Kirby game to feature 3D computer graphics and follows Kirby as he attempts to reassemble a sacred crystal shattered by Dark Matter. Gameplay is viewed from a 2.5D perspective and is similar to previous Kirby titles; the player traverses levels and obtains powers by eating enemies. Kirby 64 introduces Power Combos, the ability to mix powers to create more powerful ones. In a multiplayer mode, up to four players can compete in three minigames.

Development began in September 1997. The game was intended for the N64's 64DD add-on, but became a standard N64 title after the add-on failed. HAL initially planned to use the N64 controller's analog stick for Kirby 64, but switched to the D-pad about a year before release.

The game received mainly positive reviews, with praise directed at its colorful visuals and classic style of gameplay, but criticism towards its underwhelming low difficulty and short length. The game was rereleased for the Virtual Console on the Wii in 2008, Wii U in 2015, and the Nintendo Classics service in 2022. The game was also included in the Wii compilation Kirby's Dream Collection (2012). Kirby 64: The Crystal Shards was the last traditional Kirby game for home consoles until Kirby's Return to Dream Land (2011).

== Gameplay ==
Kirby using a Power Combo ability in the game's first level. The two copy abilities that comprise the Power Combo, "Needle" and "Cutter", are displayed in the bottom right corner of the HUD.

Kirby 64 is a side-scrolling platformer similar to previous games in the Kirby series. Its story begins when Dark Matter invades Ripple Star, a planet populated by fairies. The fairy Ribbon flees with a sacred crystal, but Dark Matter shatters it into 100 shards and scatters them across the galaxy. Ribbon, holding one of the shards, plummets into Pop Star and befriends the titular character Kirby, who agrees to help retrieve the remaining 98 shards across six planets and defeat Dark Matter. Along the way, they enlist the help of artist Adeleine, King Dedede, and Dedede's minion Waddle Dee, after each of them stumble upon a crystal shard and end up being possessed by Dark Matter, forcing Kirby to battle each of them to free them from the Dark Matter's influence.

Similar to contemporary platformers such as Pandemonium! (1996) and Klonoa: Door to Phantomile (1997), Kirby 64 is a 2.5D platformer; although environments and characters are rendered in 3D computer graphics, gameplay is restricted to a 2D plane. Players control Kirby using the Nintendo 64 controller's D-pad. Like earlier Kirby games, Kirby can walk or run, crouch, jump, and inhale enemies or objects to spit them out as bullets. He can fly for a limited time by inflating himself; while flying, Kirby cannot attack or use his other abilities, though he can release a weak puff of air. By eating certain enemies, Kirby can gain one of seven copy abilities, power-ups allowing him to take on the properties the enemy possessed. In certain levels, Kirby will ride on King Dedede's back, allowing him to clear certain obstacles with Dedede's hammer; in other levels, Kirby rides a minecart or log flume piloted by Waddle Dee.

Kirby 64 introduces Power Combos, the option to combine Kirby's copy abilities. Power Combos can be created by inhaling two enemies at once, by throwing one ability at another, or by spitting an enemy at another. The latter two methods create a colored star that can be collected to obtain the Power Combo. There are 28 possible combinations, which are stronger than normal copy abilities or have added effects. For instance, by combining the "Burn" and "Needle" abilities, Kirby can shoot fire arrows. Players can also mix two of the same abilities, which will increase their power.

The game takes place across six worlds, which are split into several levels. After the player selects a level, they must navigate it while avoiding enemies and obstacles. If Kirby or King Dedede touches an enemy or hazard, he loses health. Health can be replenished by eating food scattered across levels. If the character loses all their health, falls off the bottom of the screen, or gets crushed, the player loses a life. Losing all lives results in a game over. Players can earn lives by collecting stars or 1-ups. Shards of the crystal are scattered about levels, and while Power Combos are optional, they are required to collect several of the shards. At the end of each level, players play a bonus game to collect food, stars, or cards with information about enemies. Certain levels feature bosses that the player must defeat to proceed. Players must collect all of the crystal shards to reach the game's final boss and true ending.

Outside the single-player platforming, a multiplayer game mode can be accessed from the main menu. Here, up to four players can compete in three minigames: 100-Yard Hop, a race to the finish line; Bumper Crop Bump, a competition to collect food; and Checkerboard Chase, a last man standing game. Players can adjust the difficulty level and control Kirby, King Dedede, Adeleine, or Waddle Dee.

== Development ==
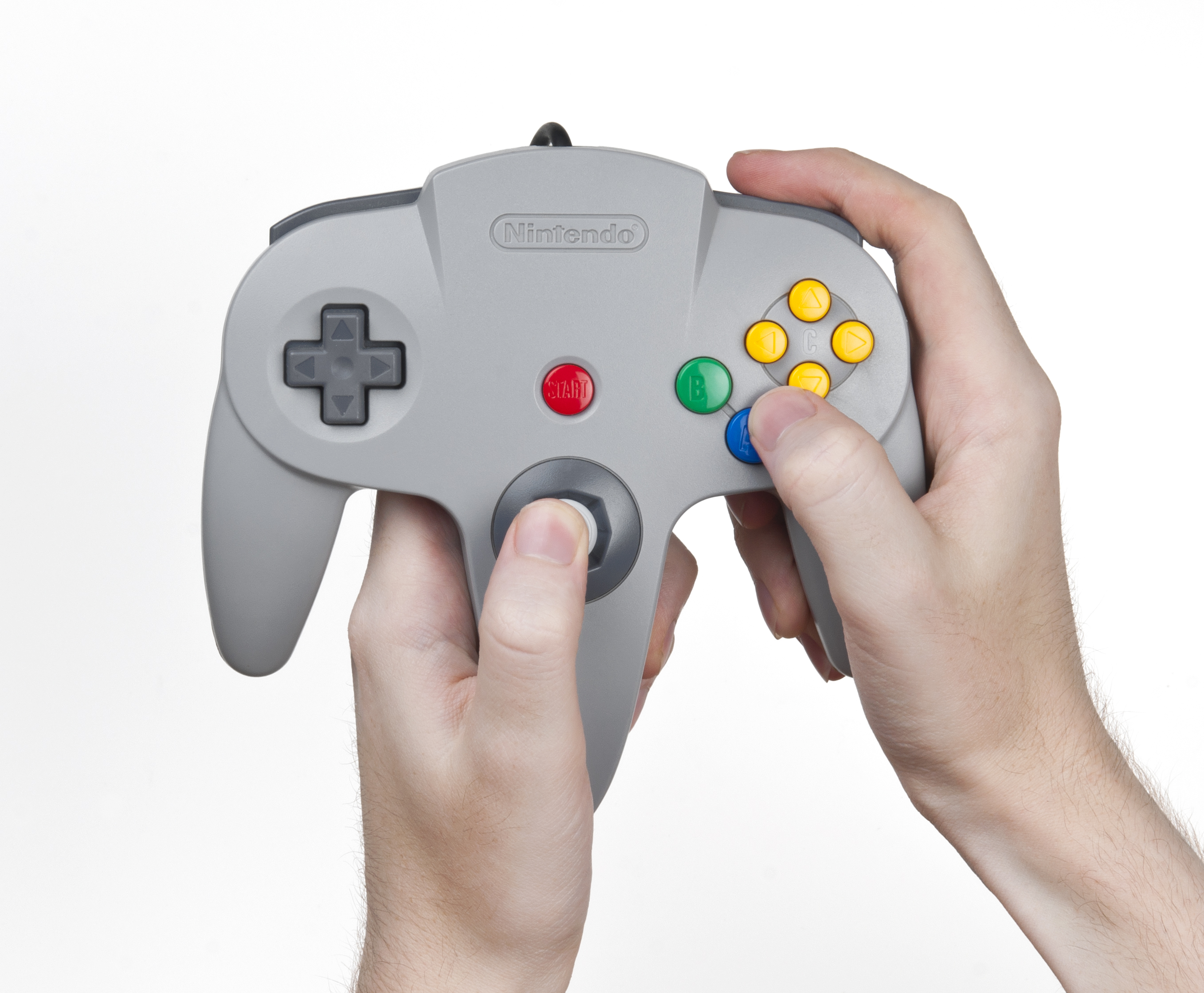
Kirby 64 was designed to use the N64 controller's analog stick as pictured, but this was changed to the D-pad during development.

Kirby 64 was developed by HAL Laboratory as the first game in its Kirby series to feature 3D graphics. Development began in September 1997, shortly before Kirby's Dream Land 3 was released. At the time, 3D graphics were becoming common, so HAL wanted to create a 3D Kirby game. According to project manager Takashi Saito, keeping the project on schedule was challenging due to HAL's close attention to detail, so he had to balance creating a quality game with releasing it on time. The development team had to be careful transitioning the series' art style to 3D as they did not want to disappoint Kirby devotees. The game was initially developed for the 64DD, a disk-drive add-on for the Nintendo 64 (N64), but became a standard N64 Game Pak after the add-on failed commercially.

By October 1997, HAL had created a prototype to experiment with Kirby in 3D. The studio worked this prototype, which used the N64 controller's analog stick to control Kirby, until about a year before release. Saito said the prototype was nearly finished and "was pretty good," but the team felt they could do better. HAL changed the control configuration from the analog stick to the D-pad because the game was played on a 2.5D plane rather than a 3D one. At Space World in 1999, the developers observed children play with the original setup. They noticed the children would leave the N64 controller on the promotional stand when using the analog stick, and had trouble using the Z shoulder button that was essential in the configuration. Coming up with a new control scheme led to debate since HAL used the Z button prominently in Super Smash Bros. (1999). The team settled on the D-pad configuration after a successful test with elementary school students.

Kirby 64 was directed by Shinichi Shimomura, who had previously directed Kirby's Dream Land 2 and Kirby's Dream Land 3. It is thematically similar to those games; Adeleine, a supporting character, and 0^{2}, the final boss, are reinterpretations of characters from Kirby's Dream Land 3. Series creator Masahiro Sakurai had little involvement with the project and avoided playing it during development, as he feared any comments he made would conflict with HAL's vision. The Power Combo game mechanic was conceived to enhance Kirby's abilities and experiment what would happen if copy abilities were mixed. Saito noted the game is designed for all ages and either easy or hard depending on playstyle. If the player relies on Power Combos too much, the game becomes challenging, but is easier if they do not. Originally, there were going to be several playable characters (including Waddle Dee, whose gameplay focused on picking up objects), but only Kirby and King Dedede remained playable in the final game. Ribbon the fairy was conceived as a means to switch the player's character. The N64's technology also made four-player minigames possible.

The game's soundtrack was provided by Jun Ishikawa and Hirokazu Ando, both regular composers for the Kirby series. Its stylistic influences include synth-pop and techno. Ishikawa spent about a year creating most of the game's music and sound effects, and believed that composing the music for the final areas as jazz music would surprise players used to the series' typical electronic influences. Late into development, Ishikawa was informed of a boss that he was not aware of, which required him to quickly compose a track by reusing samples from songs he had already finished. The result, a minimalist drum and bass song with no melody, pleased the designers of the boss.

Publisher Nintendo announced the game at E3 1999. According to IGN, Kirby representation on the N64 was "long-awaited", as an earlier series game for the system—Kirby's Air Ride—had been canceled. Kirby 64 was released in Japan on March 24, 2000, in North America on June 26, 2000, and in Europe on June 22, 2001. GameSpot noted that unlike other Kirby games, Kirby 64 saw release before support for its system ended. Saito commented that he wanted to release the game earlier, but more development time meant more polish. It was the last traditional Kirby home console game until Return to Dream Land (2011).

Nintendo re-released Kirby 64 for the Virtual Console on the Wii and Wii U in 2008 and 2015, respectively. The game was also included in Kirby's Dream Collection (2012), a 20th anniversary compilation of Kirby titles for the Wii. Kirby 64 was re-released on May 20, 2022, on the Nintendo Classics service.

Kirby 64: The Crystal Shards had a marketing budget of $4 million.

== Reception ==
Contemporary reviews

Aggregate score
Aggregator	Score
Metacritic	77/100 (Note: Score based on 22 reviews)

Review scores
Publication	Score
Edge	5/10
Famitsu	32/40
GameFan	90%
GameSpot	6.9/10
Hyper	85%
IGN	7.9/10
N64 Magazine	72%
Nintendo Life	8/10
Nintendo Power	8.1/10

Kirby 64 received "generally favorable reviews", according to the review aggregator Metacritic. Critics likened it to other 2.5D platformers on the N64 including Goemon's Great Adventure (1998) and Yoshi's Story (1997), Some felt its gameplay and visuals were reminiscent of older platform games for the Nintendo Entertainment System and Super NES. Edge viewed this as a detriment, writing that the game suffered from a lack of innovation in the midst of other Nintendo franchises establishing themselves within the growing 3D game market. They explained, writing: "There is simply not enough originality or longevity on offer for Kirby 64 to stand out among the wealth of inventive platformers already on the N64." GameFan wrote that while it was a nice break from 3D games, Kirby 64's graphics resembled Super NES games and it would soon appear antiquated.

Critics believed Kirby 64 lacked in longevity and difficulty. N64 Magazine felt the early levels were enjoyable but that later stages became stale, and opined that the game would have benefited from more complex level design. They believed Kirby 64 had wasted potential and described it as "short-lived and repetitive." Nintendo Life says the game suffers from all-too-familiar tendency of being disappointingly short. Electronic Gaming Monthly wrote that "the game's slower pace and low difficulty made it hard to stay interested after a while." Both magazines agreed that attempting to find all the shards added some challenge, but GameSpot wrote that even this content could be completed within a three-day rental period. IGN and Hyper also recommended the game as a rental to older gamers, and only as a purchase for children. The game's "cute" graphics and story elements also influenced critics to recommend the game for children. The minigames were also criticized for adding little to the game's longevity, though they did draw some positive comparisons to Mario Party.

Although the graphics were criticized for their simplicity and cuteness, they also received significant praise. N64 Magazine called the graphics the best aspect of the game and praised the scenery and environments. Electronic Gaming Monthly called the colors "bright" and "clean", and Hyper wrote that it looked like a picture book with its pastel-like shading. Nintendo Power compared the game's cute and colorful look to Yoshi's Story. IGN wrote that Kirby 64 was "Simple. Cartoony. Colorful. [...] It's a Kirby game, and it looks exactly as you'd expect it would." Several critics commended the character animations. GameSpot wrote that the characters were lifelike, and Hyper felt there was personality in all the characters and enemies.

Among retrospective reviews, Nintendo Life commented that the game's visuals held up because of their stylized shading and colors, and felt the environments gave a sense of grandeur that other Kirby titles rarely capture. Eurogamer wrote that it "doesn't do as much with the N64 as it could have done, and remains a perennial second-stringer in the Nintendo pantheon for that very reason, but that's no excuse to dismiss something this engaging and polished." GamesRadar listed Kirby 64 as the sixth best Kirby game (in 2012) and the 23rd best N64 game. USgamer ranked it as the 13th best traditional Kirby game out of 16 in 2017, calling it "uninspired."
