= Bakeru =

2023 video game

- Developer: Good-Feel
- Publisher: Spike Chunsoft
- Director: Tadanori Tsukawaki
- Producer: Etsunobu Ebisu
- Designer: Keita Sakunaga
- Programmer: Takuya Seki
- Artist: Tadanori Tsukawaki
- Composer: Satoshi Okubo
- Engine: Unity
- Platforms: Nintendo Switch; Windows
- Release: Nintendo Switch: JP: 30 November 2023; WW: 3 September 2024; Windows: WW: 3 September 2024
- Genre: Action
- Mode: Single-player

Bakeru (Note: Japanese: 御伽活劇 豆狸のバケル ～オラクル祭太郎の祭難！！～, Hepburn: Otogi Katsugeki Mameda no Bakeru: Oracle Saitarou no Sainan!!) is a 2023 action video game developed by Good-Feel and published by Spike Chunsoft. It was released in Japan for the Nintendo Switch on 30 November 2023. It was later released internationally for Nintendo Switch and Windows on 3 September 2024. Bakeru has been described as a spiritual successor to the Ganbare Goemon series.

== Gameplay ==
The player controls Bakeru, a tanuki boy disguised as a human who performs action with his taiko.

== Development and release ==
Bakeru was developed by Japanese developer Good-Feel. It was directed by Tadanori Tsukawaki and produced by Etsunobu Ebisu, both of which were lead creators of Konami's Ganbare Goemon series. The development team focused on keeping the game design simple and intuitive, forgoing complex management system.

The game was released first in Japan for Nintendo Switch on 30 November 2023, both physically and digitally. Spike Chunsoft published the international version in the west, which added the Windows port, on 3 September 2024. The Western release made adjustments to improve gameplay and added extra content, such as Bakeru's new actions. A physical edition in North American and Europe was made available on 25 February 2025.

== Reception ==
Reception

Aggregate scores
| Aggregator | Score |
|---|---|
| Metacritic | NS: 81/100 |
| OpenCritic | 85% recommend |

Review scores
| Publication | Score |
|---|---|
| Edge | 6/10 |
| Nintendo Life | 8/10 |
| Digitally Downloaded | 9/10 |
| CG Magazine | 9/10 |

Bakeru received positive reviews on release. The game received "generally favorable" reviews according to review aggregator Metacritic. 85% of 34 critics recommended the game according to OpenCritic.
