= Arcana (video game) =

1992 video game

- North American cover art
- Developer: HAL Laboratory
- Publisher: HAL Laboratory: NA: HAL America
- Directors: Shigeru Hashiguchi; Mat Sutake
- Programmer: Ryuki Kuraoka
- Writers: Shigeru Hashiguchi; Shigenobu Kasai
- Composers: Jun Ishikawa; Hirokazu Ando
- Platform: Super NES
- Release: JP: March 27, 1992; NA: May 1992
- Genre: Dungeon crawl
- Mode: Single-player

Arcana (Note: Released in Japan as Card Master: Rimsalia no Fuuin (Japanese: カードマスター リムサリアの封印)) is a role-playing video game released for the Super Nintendo Entertainment System by HAL Laboratory in 1992. The game represents all of its characters as cards, but plays like a dungeon-crawling role-playing game rather than a card-based game. In keeping with this metaphor, the death of a character results in a 'torn' card, and the magical properties of some cards are used to explain abilities of the game's characters.

== Gameplay ==
A battle between the party and a lupus (wolf)

Assuming a first-person perspective, the dungeons and towns of the game are navigated from the viewpoint of the characters and, with a few exceptions, the conversations between characters hold true to this as well. Battles within the game are portrayed in the first person, displaying the protagonist characters along the perimeter of the screen, with the enemies in the center. Arcana's battles are not graphically intensive, and the characters' animations are limited to, at most, five frames. Damage incurred by characters is summarised in a text display at the bottom of the screen.

The map's tile-based dungeons only allow the player to see what is immediately before the characters. The player is free to move in cardinal directions. Labyrinthine in their design, and often fraught with dead ends and hidden dangers, the detail in the drawing of these dungeons compensates for their relative lack of animation.

Battles within the game follow a strict turn system. As each character takes their turn, various options are presented to the player. Rooks, the principal character, possesses many of the vital battling techniques. Because he can switch the elemental spirits, flee the battle, and use magical card spells which, though powerful, were expensive, Rooks is the most valuable resource to the party. If Rooks is incapacitated, the entire party is crippled. A battle is followed with the reward of experience points and gold. However, the level progression of all of the characters is standardized; there is no randomness to what statistics increase when a character levels up.

Four elemental spirits, Sylph (wind), Efrite (fire), Dao (earth), and Marid (water), rotate through the same slot in the battle formation. Rooks and a spirit are always in the player's party, providing two other spots for party members. Unlike the human characters, an elemental can die and the game will continue. Their card will be torn, and they can be rotated out for a live elemental. If Rooks is incapacitated, however, the player can be stuck with a dead elemental. Spirits can be resurrected for a fee by the spirit healer who resides in each town, or by a spell Rooks can learn at a high experience level.

The game's difficulty is determined by various factors:

- Easy game overs: In contrast to the norm for RPGs of the era, which dictated that the death of one character in the player's party was usually a recoverable loss, in Arcana, the death of any character save an elemental results in a game over. This means that an unexpected confrontation could result in a speedy demise.
- Little forewarning: Due to the convoluted nature of the passages, a common cause of death for a player's character is the sudden discovery of a boss character. The gravity of the situation is not apparent to the player until the fight begins. The presence of these boss characters is not always deducible in advance, and in many cases results simply from the player's movement onto a particular tile.
- Scarcity of save points: Saving the game is limited to the town area of each level. As such, it is possible to be in a difficult situation without any restorative items. The player must escape to the solace of the town before further engaging monsters.
- Limited inventory: The party's inventory is limited to forty-two item slots. Items in this game do not stack, providing a very strict item limit.
- Linearity: Having completed a dungeon, the player cannot subsequently return. The dungeon explored is determined by the player's progress in the story and not chosen. This prevents players from returning to a dungeon with easier monsters, and risks being stuck in a dungeon whose monsters are too strong to overcome.

== Plot ==
The ancient land of Elemen was rife with chaos under the tyranny of the evil Empress Rimsala (Rimsalia). A group of powerful wizards called the Card Masters combined their abilities to defeat Rimsala and seal her away. But her legacy would not be forgotten.

Decades later, political unrest in the kingdoms of Elemen turned into bloody civil war. As armies slaughtered each other on the battlefields, the Card Masters were persecuted and hunted down by the minions of Galneon, the former court magician of Wagnall, King of Lexford. Galneon was the man who had launched the original coup that began the war, but his motives were much more sinister than bloodshed. He sought the unsealing and resurrection of Rimsala, to unleash her ancient evil upon Elemen again. In the conflict, King Wagnall's two daughters disappeared. It was also the last battle for the Knights of Lexford, a trio of brave fighters sworn to Wagnall, which dissolved as the war drew to a close. Galneon assumed power and stretched forth his oppressive authority across Elemen, eliminating every Card Master found so that the revival of Rimsala could succeed without interference.

Ten years have passed since these events. The young protagonist Rooks is the son of the last Card Master to perish during Elemen's civil war, who was also one of the Knights of Lexford. The death of his father motivated Rooks to begin learning the art of the cards in earnest, but in a decade his minimal training has barely scratched the surface when word comes to his home village of Galia. Mysterious events are occurring all over the land, heralding a cataclysm. Rooks's path lies before him as he sets off to prevent the awakening of Rimsala, so he must fulfill his destiny as the last Card Master before it is too late.

=== Characters ===
- Rooks: (Note: Japanese: ルークス, Hepburn: Ruukusu) Hero of the story and the last surviving Card Master. His parents were killed during Galneon's coup ten years ago. Rooks is the only character who can call the spirits to change which one is in the player's active lineup. As the Card Master, only he can use magical Cards in battle, which have various effects on enemies and the party. His other talents include swordsmanship, healing magic, and magic to negatively affect enemy stats.
- Ariel: (Note: Japanese: アラン, Hepburn: Aran (Alan)) Rooks's childhood friend, he has not seen him in ten years. Ariel seems to have several apprentices whom he taught, however what exactly they were learning is unknown as each has different styles of battle. It was because of Ariel's request to go to Balnia Temple that Rooks's adventure begins. However, there is more to him than he shows. Ariel is not playable but is interacted with at several points in the game.
- Teefa: (Note: Japanese: ティーファ, Hepburn: Teiifua) One of Ariel's apprentices. She is decent in battle but her real talent lies in sorcery. Teefa is the only character in the game who can master the eleventh level Attribute spell. Also, she can cast some healing magic. The first to join the player's party while following Ariel's request.
- Salah: (Note: Japanese: サラ, Hepburn: Sara (Sarah)) One of the two missing daughters of King Wagnall of Lexford who Axs has been taking care of since the coup. Like Teefa, Salah is primarily a magician. It was she who healed the injuries Rooks sustained during Chapter 1.
- Darwin: (Note: Japanese: アーウィン, Hepburn: Aauin (Arwen)) A wandering elf with two different color eyes that switch depending on which side of the party he is placed. The fighter-mage character who is good at both talents. His reasoning for joining Rooks's party is unclear at first but will be revealed over time. Darwin is also the character who joins the most; he accompanies Rooks in three chapters while the others only are playable in two.
- Axs: (Note: Japanese: アックス, Hepburn: Akkusu (Ax)) The last surviving member of the Knights of Lexford; a group that once consisted of himself, Rooks's father and Ariel's father. After the king died, Axs became the caretaker of his young daughter, Salah. A warrior through and through, Axs uses the fewest spells and none that have any offensive powers.
- Galneon: (Note: Japanese: ガルネール, Hepburn: Garuneeru (Garnel)) The former court magician from Lexford, he assassinated King Wagnall one day ten years ago and claimed the throne for himself. Currently, he is attempting to gain the three treasures necessary to revive the evil Empress Rimsala. Galneon is not playable.

== Reception ==
Reception

Aggregate score
Aggregator	Score
GameRankings	76%

Review scores
Publication	Score
Famitsu	6/10, 6/10, 5/10, 6/10
Nintendo Life	7/10
Nintendo Power	3.55/5
RPGFan	81%
Super Play	6/10
VideoGames & Computer Entertainment	7/10
Control	62%
RPG Site	8/10
SNES Force	57%
Super Action	69%
The Super Famicom	62/100
Super Pro	55%

Arcana received a 20.85/30 score in a 1993 readers' poll conducted by Super Famicom Magazine, ranking among Super Famicom titles at the number 140 spot. The game received generally favorable reception, holding a rating of 76% based on four reviews according to review aggregator GameRankings.

Time Extension listed Arcana as one of the best SNES games, saying "the challenge is pitched perfectly" and calling the game audiovisually superior to Shining in the Darkness.
