= BoxBoy! =

Video game series

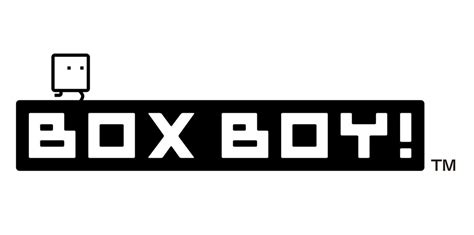
- Genre: Puzzle-platform
- Developer: HAL Laboratory
- Publisher: Nintendo
- Creator: Yasuhiro Mukae
- Composers: Jun Ishikawa; Hirokazu Ando
- Platforms: Nintendo 3DS; Nintendo Switch iOS; Android
- First release: BoxBoy! January 14, 2015
- Latest release: BoxBoy! + BoxGirl! April 26, 2019

BoxBoy! (Note: Japanese: ハコボーイ！, Hepburn: Hako Bōi!) is a series of puzzle-platform games developed by HAL Laboratory and published by Nintendo. The series centres around Qbby, a square-shaped character who can produce a string of connected boxes. The boxes are used to overcome obstacles in stages that Qbby must be guided through. The first game, BoxBoy!, released on January 14, 2015, in Japan on the Nintendo 3DS. Its sequel, BoxBoxBoy!, was released for the Nintendo 3DS in 2016, with a third game, Bye-Bye BoxBoy!, in 2017. A physical compilation of the first three games, HakoBoy! Hakozume Box, was released in Japan. A fourth installment, BoxBoy! + BoxGirl!, was released for the Nintendo Switch in April 2019.

== Games ==
Release timeline
2015	BoxBoy!
2016	BoxBoxBoy!
2017	Bye-Bye BoxBoy! Uniqlo x HakoBoy!
2018
2019	BoxBoy! + BoxGirl!

=== BoxBoy! ===
BoxBoy! was developed by Japanese video game company HAL Laboratory. It was a small experimental project in development while the studio was working on Kirby: Triple Deluxe and Kirby and the Rainbow Curse. The project plan for BoxBoy! was conceived in July 2011 by employee Yasuhiro Mukae, who would later serve as the game's director. The game revolves around Qbby, a character who can produce boxes and use them to solve puzzles, move around, and press switches.

=== BoxBoxBoy! ===
A sequel, BoxBoxBoy!, was released in Japan in January 2016, and in other territories in June 2016. This game introduces the concept of being able to summon two sets of boxes at once.

=== Bye-Bye BoxBoy! ===
Bye-Bye BoxBoy! was released worldwide in 2017. It features boxes with special properties, such as exploding and warping, and Qbabies that Qbby must escort to the end of a level.

=== Uniqlo x HakoBoy! ===
A spinoff advergame promoting a line of Japan-exclusive BOXBOY!-themed clothing released in 2017 by Uniqlo, Uniqlo x HakoBoy! is a mobile game accessible from Uniqlo's official iOS and Android app. Players do not control Qbby directly, but instead swipe to create boxes. Qbby will then attempt to use the boxes the player has made in order to reach the end of a level.

=== BoxBoy! + BoxGirl! ===
BoxBoy! + BoxGirl! is the fourth game in the BoxBoy! series and first to be released on the Nintendo Switch. BoxBoy! + BoxGirl! features a two-player multiplayer mode for the first time in the series, which was praised by critics. The game was released worldwide for the Nintendo Switch exclusively via Nintendo eShop on April 26, 2019.

== Reception ==
Aggregate review scores As of May 1, 2020.
Game	Year	Metacritic
BoxBoy!	2015	Nintendo 3DS: 80
BoxBoxBoy!	2016	Nintendo 3DS: 80
Bye-Bye BoxBoy!	2017	Nintendo 3DS: 83
BoxBoy! + BoxGirl!	2019	Nintendo Switch: 81

The BoxBoy! series has received generally favourable reviews from critics according to review aggregator website Metacritic. Each game earned between 80 and 83/100.

IGN awarded the first game, BoxBoy!, 8.2/10, complementing its black-and-white style and level of complexity. GameSpot gave the same game a score of 8/10 for its clever puzzles, easiness, and cuteness. However, they criticized its slow difficulty ramp.
