= HyperZone =

1991 video game

- Developer: HAL Laboratory
- Publisher: HAL Laboratory
- Programmers: Hiroaki Suga; Miya Aoki
- Composer: Jun Ishikawa
- Platform: Super Nintendo Entertainment System
- Release: JP: 31 August 1991; NA: September 1991; EU: 1992
- Genre: Rail shooter
- Mode: Single-player

HyperZone (Note: Japanese: ハイパーゾーン, Hepburn: HaipāZōn) is a rail shooter video game developed and published by HAL Laboratory for the Super Nintendo Entertainment System (SNES). It used the SNES' Mode 7 capability.

== Gameplay ==
Gameplay screenshot.

HyperZone is a rail shooter game. The object of the game is to navigate each level while shooting enemies and earning points until encountering a boss enemy, at the end of each level. After enough points are acquired, the player earns an extent and their ship is upgraded at the beginning of the next stage. The player's ship can receive up to six upgrades.

As a racing game, the resemblance is visual. The mode 7 tracks are similar to the well-known progenitor of mode 7 racing, F-Zero. As a scrolling shooter, it is also similar to Star Fox in that the player's ship is constantly pushed forward through each level. While it is possible to slow down, doing so gradually causes damage to the player's ship.

HyperZone contains eight levels. After the initial game is finished, it restarts from the beginning with the player continuing in their final ship and keeping score; the game loops infinitely.

== Synopsis ==
The game is set in the year 2089, where Earth has become unable to support life due to humankind's ignorance. The Earth Council has turned their attention to the asteroid belt between Mars and Jupiter - a place virtually untouched by civilization. But a hostile race of cybernetic beings has taken up residence there, and if humankind is to survive, the infestation must be eradicated...

== Development and release ==
HyperZone has a resemblance to Eliminator, a game released for the Amiga and various 8-bit computers. The game's perspective and its unusual landscapes were inspired by the "Star Gate" sequence of 2001: A Space Odyssey. The offtrack landscape in the Material Factory (Area 1 in the US/European version, Area 3 in the Japanese version) is a tessellation of flashing tetrominos that resemble those in Tetris; the boss in Area 3 resembles the right part of the SNES controller, and buttons—of the same four colors as the Japanese and PAL region SNES logo—circle around it. Another HAL game, Kirby's Dream Land 3, references this game: The final area in the game is called Hyperzone, and several other areas share names.

Stereoscopic 3D support was partially added, but is not enabled unless the user enters a cheat code on the gamepad. It is supposed it requires LCD shutter glasses, or perhaps future programming to enable anaglyph.

=== Regional differences ===
The Japanese version is called Hyper Zone, and its logotypes in and out of the game differ from those in the western version. Levels 1 and 3 underwent a graphics swap between the two versions: the level layout and enemy positioning (aside from each boss encounter) is still the same, but the graphics set and background music are different. It is unknown why this was done because levels 1 and 3 have bosses that do not fit into their respective color schemes in the western versions.

== Reception ==
Reception

Review scores
Publication	Score
AllGame	2.5/5
Electronic Gaming Monthly	4/10, 4/10, 4/10, 6/10
Famitsu	6/10, 6/10, 6/10, 4/10
Games-X	4/5
Super Play	3/10
Control	58%
Entertainment Weekly	A
Game Boy	3/5, 3/5, 3/5, 3/5, 2/5
Hippon Super!	7/10
Super Action	41%
The Super Famicom	B
Super Pro	51/100

HyperZone received a 20.36/30 score in a 1993 readers' poll conducted by Super Famicom Magazine, ranking among Super Famicom titles at the number 172 spot. The game garnered mixed reviews from critics.
