= Super Princess Peach =

2005 video game

- North American box art
- Developer: Tose
- Publisher: Nintendo
- Directors: Akio Imai; Azusa Tajima
- Producers: Yasuhiro Minamimoto; Hitoshi Yamagami
- Designers: Takayuki Ikeda (concept); Akira Mochizuki; Yuichiro Nakayama
- Programmer: Kenta Egami
- Artists: Yasuko Takahashi; Daiki Nishioka; Chiharu Sakiyama
- Composer: Akira Fujiwara
- Series: Mario
- Platform: Nintendo DS
- Release: JP/TW: October 20, 2005; KR: November 4, 2005; NA: February 27, 2006; OC: March 31, 2006; EU: May 26, 2006
- Genre: Platform
- Mode: Single-player

Super Princess Peach (Note: Japanese: スーパープリンセスピーチ, Hepburn: Sūpā Purinsesu Pīchi) is a 2005 platform game developed by Tose and published by Nintendo for the Nintendo DS. It was released in Japan in October 2005 and worldwide the following year. Super Princess Peach is the first game to feature Princess Peach as the main protagonist on a dedicated video game console and the second overall after Princess Toadstool's Castle Run released in 1990 on the Nelsonic Game Watch.

The game follows Peach's trip to Vibe Island to rescue Mario and Luigi, whom Bowser kidnaps after obtaining the emotion-controlling Vibe Scepter to enhance his minions, in a reversal of the damsel in distress trope. While there, Peach teams up with a magical parasol called Perry, who gives her advice and additional attacking and defensive options, and learns to use the emotional energies known as Vibes to enhance her own attacks, solve puzzles, and fight Bowser and his forces.

First announced by Nintendo in 2004, Super Princess Peach was released in Japan in October 2005 and later elsewhere in 2006. Super Princess Peach has received generally positive reviews from critics, with praise for the gameplay, graphics, story, and soundtrack, while it received some criticism for its low difficulty. The game sold 1.7 million copies worldwide, making it the 50th-best-selling game for the Nintendo DS.

== Gameplay ==
Princess Peach navigates a level in World 2, Hoo's Wood. The lower screen indicates that she is expressing the "Calm" Vibe, this can also be seen in the faint bubble surrounding her in the upper screen.

Super Princess Peach plays similarly to traditional platformers. Players guide Princess Peach through Vibe Island, composed of eight worlds, each of which contains five standard levels and a boss battle level that leads the player to the next world. Three captive Toads are hidden throughout each level, with the first six boss battles holding a single Toad hostage in a bubble. In the seventh and penultimate boss battle, Luigi appears in place of the usual Toad. To access the final battle with Bowser and save Mario, Peach must rescue all of the Toads and Luigi. After beating Bowser for the first time, Peach unlocks extra levels in the first world; replaying the other boss battles unlocks further extra levels in subsequent worlds. There are 24 total extra levels to unlock. Replaying the battle with Bowser doubles the times he must be hit to be defeated in his giant form.

Peach can fight enemies primarily by stomping on them, which does not defeat them outright; hitting them with Perry, her talking parasol sidekick; or having Perry absorb them. As a result of being on Vibe Island but not being directly affected by the Vibe Scepter, she is free to channel four "Vibes" that give her different emotion-based powers to solve puzzles and combat enemies: Joy, which enables her to fly and generate a cyclone; Rage, which produces an aura of fire around her while causing small earthquakes after every jump, at the cost of some jumping height and running speed; Gloom, which increases her running speed and can grow plants, extinguish fires, etc.; and Calm, which recovers her health, represented by a heart meter. The Vibes are enabled and disabled using heart panels on the bottom screen, and the background music changes depending on which Vibe is being used. Some enemies are also affected by Vibes and have unlimited capacity to use them. Peach's capacity is limited by a Vibe Gauge, which drains from Vibe usage but can be replenished by collecting turquoise gems or absorbing enemies. Peach has unlimited lives, but if she loses all her hearts, she will have to restart a level from the beginning.

In addition, the game features a shop where players can buy items. Using coins as currency, players can purchase incremental upgrades to increase Peach's health and Vibe Gauge and unlock new abilities for herself and Perry. By finishing the game and completing all bonuses, the player can buy a drink dubbed the "Endless Vibe", allowing Peach to use her Vibes without having the Vibe Gauge decrease. The game's bonuses include a glossary of enemies and bosses, jigsaw puzzles, mini-games, a music room, and replays of Perry's dreams, which occur after each boss battle except the last. There are three minigames, and the levels are unlocked as the player purchases them in the shop. All minigames have the player control Toads in various activities.

== Plot ==
Bowser hears of a legendary emotion-controlling artifact called the Vibe Scepter, hidden on an island near the Mushroom Kingdom called Vibe Island, and builds a summer getaway home there in hopes of using it to his advantage. After his second-in-command, Army Hammer Bro, finds the Scepter for him, Bowser hatches a plan to capture the Mario Brothers. Army Hammer Bro entrusts the scepter to a Goomba and sends it into Princess Peach's castle. With the residents of the castle under the influence of the scepter, Army Hammer Bro and his troops successfully capture Mario, Luigi, and many Toads, imprisoning them all across the island. Returning to Bowser's Villa, the Goomba becomes influenced by the scepter and begins swinging it around, causing Bowser and his minions to lose control of their emotions before Bowser seizes it.

Meanwhile, Princess Peach and Toadsworth return to her castle after a short walk, only to find the residents in emotional disarray and a note from Bowser saying that he has captured Mario and Luigi. Outraged but determined, Peach decides to go to Vibe Island to save the Mario Bros. and the Toads. Shortly before her departure, Toadsworth, reluctant to see Peach travel on her own, gives her a sentient parasol named Perry to help her on her journey.

Peach and Perry rescue Toads and fight back against Bowser's minions as they explore the different regions of the island. Because of the Goomba's earlier flaunting of the scepter, emotional energies known as Vibes have been dispersed all over the island, and many of Bowser's minions are still influenced by them. Peach is also affected upon arrival, but because she was not directly affected by the scepter, she has better control, gaining new abilities from each. Each time she defeats a boss and clears an area, Perry's backstory is revealed in flashbacks seen in his dreams as he sleeps opposite Peach at a campfire during the night. Long ago, Perry was a young boy with magical powers whose earliest memory was finding himself on a mountainside. He was adopted by an old man whom he came to call "Grandpa". One day, Perry was confronted by a pair of enigmatic magicians who had seemingly heard of the boy's powers and transformed him into an umbrella. The wizard and his henchman captured Perry and brought him toward an unconfirmed location, but he escaped by wiggling free from his captors and fell onto the road. Some time later, a traveling merchant found him and sold him to Toadsworth.

After defeating Giant Kamek, the penultimate boss, and freeing Luigi, Peach and Perry arrive at Bowser's Villa, where they confront Bowser and Army Hammer Bro. Bowser uses the Vibe Scepter to increase Army Hammer Bro's power with Rage, but Peach bests him and his fellow Hamer Bros. She then fights Bowser himself, and after his own defeat, the Koopa King uses the scepter to grow to colossal proportions. Peach and Perry defeat him again by throwing Bob-ombs at him, then send him flying out of the villa. Peach frees Mario and takes everyone home to the Mushroom Kingdom. Meanwhile, the scepter, dropped by Bowser after Peach sent him flying, is left to an unknown fate, although an epilogue text suggests that, in a breaking of the fourth wall, it may be in the player's house, influencing their parents' emotions.

== Development ==
Super Princess Peach was first announced by Nintendo in October 2004 with the exclusion of a posted release date. It was first released in Japan on October 20, 2005. It later came out in North America and Europe on February 27 and May 26, 2006, respectively.

When discussing Peach's portrayal in the game, Shigeru Miyamoto, creator of the character and the Mario franchise, stated that it was important for Nintendo for Peach to be "Peach-like", meaning that she evokes the "free optimism of a Princess." He explained that she has never seen herself as being "protected" by Mario, and that their intended image of her is an image of strength, due to many Nintendo developers being used to a matriarchal figure at home.

The four emotions Peach can express via the Vibes were inspired by the Japanese concept of kidoairaku (きどあいらく; "the four emotions", lit. "joy, anger, sorrow, ease").

== Reception ==
Reception

Aggregate scores
Aggregator	Score
GameRankings	76.60% (56 reviews)
Metacritic	75% (48 reviews)

Review scores
Publication	Score
1Up.com	B+
Eurogamer	6/10
Famitsu	34/40
Game Informer	8.75/10
GamePro	4/5
GameRevolution	C+
GameSpot	7.2/10
GameSpy	3.5/5
GamesRadar+	3.5/5
GameZone	8.8/10
IGN	7.8/10
Nintendo Life	7.8/10
Nintendo World Report	8/10
Official Nintendo Magazine	72%
X-Play	4/5

Super Princess Peach received generally positive reviews from critics, it currently has an average rating of 76.60% on GameRankings, and of 75% on Metacritic.

By July 2007, 1.15 million copies of Super Princess Peach have been sold worldwide. It is one of the best-selling Nintendo DS video games.

The role reversal of having Peach as the heroine and protagonist instead of the damsel in distress rescuing Mario in her own adventure was widely praised. Nintendo World Report praised how Peach finally got her chance to do the rescuing after years of only being the one rescued, and described the game as a “cute, delightfully absurd” Mario title. GameSpot considered it a “neat bit of role-reversal for Peach” and felt the game does "a good job of defining itself outside the usual Mario formula". GamesRadar described the game as "long-overdue Peach-centered action", adding it was "about time" Bowser targeted the source of his problems and enjoyed how Peach was determined to bring Mario and Luigi home on her own. Nintendo Life celebrated how Peach finally got her own solo adventure while even getting to save Mario all by herself.

The game's lack of difficulty was widely noted and received some criticism. GameSpy noted that the number of shop items and the health-replenishing Calm Vibe made it "quite tough to die". IGN was more critical, criticizing Nintendo for "going out of its way" to "spoon-feed" the player full of tips and information. Reviewer Ryan Davis from GameSpot similarly wrote that the game was too easy for the average platformer player. X-Play's Morgan Webb gave it a 4/5, commenting that the game was very easy to play and should be played by first timers to platform games.

Critics praised the Vibe powers as a mechanic which made the game feel unique and distinguish itself from traditional Mario games and platformer games. GameSpot felt that "Vibe powers put unique spin on 2D platformer standards", noted that they are used to solve obstacles and boss fights throughout the game, and listed it as one of the game's strengths. Vooks called the Vibe powers the most interesting part of Peach’s magical arsenal and felt the abilities kept the game from "feeling like a cookie-cutter Mario clone".

The nature of the Vibes and Nintendo's marketing campaign were also noted in some reviews. Davis accused Nintendo of putting "weird sexist undercurrents" into the game, while GameSpy's Bryn Williams wondered if Nintendo was trying to say that all females were "emo". Craig Harris from IGN said that the copy that Nintendo sent to him came in a box scented with perfume. Brett Elston from GamesRadar considered Peach's emotions useful tools, described how the Vibes were used in a "constructive manner" to clear obstacles and defeat enemies, and stated that using them was "more fun than just jumping around". In a retrospective review, CGMagazine defended the game's design by remarking that the game's intention was to show "actively feeling and expressing emotion as a way to solve problems" and noted that Peach was not portrayed as overwhelmed by uncontrollable feelings but contrarily being able to freely control them at will, thus breaking sexist stereotypes. They framed the negative commentary towards the Vibes and emotions as "a patriarchy-driven reading problem", and felt the focus on emotions was an empowering design choice for its time rather than a flaw.

TheGamer listed the game on their list of "15 DS Games That Deserve A Remake For Nintendo Switch". Comic Book Resources claimed that "Super Princess Peach 2 would provide some excellent continuity". DigitallyDownloaded noted the game in a list of "Ten Nintendo DS games that need a 3DS sequel".

=== Accolades ===
Year	Award	Category	Result	Ref.
2006	NAVGTR Awards	Original Children's	Nominated	
2006	Golden Joystick Awards	Girls' Choice Award	Nominated	
2007	Internet Advertising Competition Award	Best Toy & Hobby Integrated Ad Campaign	Won	

== Legacy ==
From February 2006 to March 2007, the magazine Famitsu DS+Gamecube+Advance published a comical manga based on the game called Peach no Daiboken!? created by Kazumi Sugiyama. Like the original game, the story deals with Peach, traveling with Perry and joined by Toadsworth, to save her friends abducted by Bowser.

In the manga Super Mario-kun, Peach used her vibe powers and appeared with Perry.

On June 21, 2023, Nintendo announced a new game starring Princess Peach as the lead character to be released for the Nintendo Switch in 2024. It was revealed as Princess Peach: Showtime! on September 14, 2023, to be released on March 22, 2024. Despite not being a direct sequel to Super Princess Peach, it shares similar sidescroller elements. The game marks 19 years since Peach appeared as the protagonist in a video game, and is her third game in a leading role overall.
