= BoxBoy! + BoxGirl! =

2019 video game

- Developer: HAL Laboratory
- Publisher: Nintendo
- Director: Taku Koinuma
- Producers: Yasuhiro Mukae; Toyokazu Nonaka
- Artist: Akiko Horiuchi
- Composers: Yuuta Ogasawara; Jun Ishikawa; Hirokazu Ando
- Series: BoxBoy!
- Engine: Unity
- Platform: Nintendo Switch
- Release: WW: April 26, 2019
- Genre: Puzzle-platform
- Modes: Single-player, multiplayer

BoxBoy! + BoxGirl! (Note: Japanese: ハコボーイ！＆ハコガール！, Hepburn: Hako Bōi! & Hako Gāru!) is a 2019 puzzle-platform game developed by HAL Laboratory and published by Nintendo for the Nintendo Switch. It is the fourth game in the BoxBoy! series, a follow-up to Bye-Bye BoxBoy! (2017), and is the first installment not released on the Nintendo 3DS. The game also features a two-player multiplayer mode, a first for the series.

BoxBoy! + BoxGirl! was released worldwide for the Nintendo Switch via Nintendo eShop on April 26, 2019. It received generally positive reviews from critics, with praise for its gameplay innovations and multiplayer, though the game's difficulty divided critics.

== Gameplay ==
Like previous entries in the series, BoxBoy! + BoxGirl! is a puzzle platform video game. The main gameplay mechanic revolves around generating a chain of boxes to overcome obstacles and reach the end of the level. Each level has a limit on the number of boxes that can be created at a time. Boxes can be used for a variety of functions, such as forming bridges, blocking hazards, and pressing switches. In the single-player campaign, dubbed "A Tale for One", players control Qbby to create strings of boxes which can be placed down, held out, or retracted by Qbby. Levels are grouped into worlds, each of which are themed with different obstacles and abilities.

BoxBoy! + BoxGirl! contains 270 levels across three campaigns, the most of any game in the series. For the first time in the series, the game features a two-player campaign, "A Tale for Two". In this mode, one player controls Qbby and the other controls Qucy, and both work together to progress their way through the levels. Each level has a limit on the number of boxes that each player can create at a time. Puzzles in the two-player campaign often require cooperation between the players to be solved. The two-player campaign can also be played individually by switching back and forth between controlling Qbby and Qucy.

A third campaign can be unlocked, "A Tall Tale", in which players control Qudy, a rectangular character that can rotate horizontally and vertically. This campaign features an extra set of puzzles that take advantage of the long, rectangular-shaped boxes that Qudy can create.

The levels feature collectible crowns which reward players with medals, which can be used to buy bonuses such as cosmetics, power-ups, and challenge stages. Medals can also be obtained by completing a level using a limited number of boxes. The in-game currency can also be used to buy hints that demonstrate how to complete the level.

== Release ==
BoxBoy! + BoxGirl! was announced for the Nintendo Switch in a February 2019 Nintendo Direct. A free demo was made available for download on April 17, 2019. The game was released worldwide for the Nintendo Switch exclusively via the Nintendo eShop on April 26, 2019.

== Reception ==
Reception

Aggregate scores
Aggregator	Score
Metacritic	81/100
OpenCritic	92% recommend

Review scores
Publication	Score
Game Informer	8.5/10
GameRevolution	4/5
GameSpot	7/10
Nintendo World Report	8/10
USgamer	4/5
Digitally Downloaded	5/5

BoxBoy! + BoxGirl! received a score of 81/100 on review aggregator website Metacritic, indicating "generally favorable reviews". Fellow review aggregator OpenCritic assessed that the game received strong approval, being recommended by 92% of critics.

Reviewers praised the new co-op mode, highlighting the addition of puzzles made possible by the multiplayer campaign. The unique gameplay of Qudy's campaign were also well received in keeping the game engaging. Ben Reeves of Game Informer was impressed by the fresh challenges the developers were able to create, even with the game being the fourth entry in the series. However, critics found some levels to be repetitive and overlap on their concepts.

Game Revolution writer Toby Saunders described the game as slightly too easy, criticizing the hint system for taking away from the game's challenge. Others found the relaxed difficulty a good complement to the simple controls and visuals that the BoxBoy! series exhibits.
