= BoxBoxBoy! =

2016 video game

- Developer: HAL Laboratory
- Publisher: Nintendo
- Director: Yasuhiro Mukae
- Producers: Satoshi Mitsuhara; Keisuke Terasaki
- Designer: Yusuke Ota
- Programmer: Takaaki Kawahara
- Artist: Hiroshi Saigusa
- Composers: Jun Ishikawa; Hirokazu Ando
- Series: BoxBoy!
- Platform: Nintendo 3DS
- Release: JP: January 6, 2016; WW: June 30, 2016
- Genre: Puzzle-platform
- Mode: Single-player

BoxBoxBoy! (Note: Japanese: ハコボーイ! もうひとハコ, Hepburn: BoxBoy! One More Box) is a 2016 puzzle-platform game developed by HAL Laboratory and published by Nintendo for the Nintendo 3DS handheld game console. The second game in the BoxBoy! series, the game was released in Japan in January 2016, and in other territories in June 2016.

== Gameplay ==
Like in BoxBoy!, BoxBoxBoy! has players controlling Qbby, a box-shaped character who can create boxes from out of his body. Like before, players use boxes to solve various puzzles, such as climbing on ledges, pushing switches, and avoiding obstacles, in order to reach the end of each level. In this game, Qbby is able to create two sets of boxes at a time, allowing for more complex puzzle solving. (Note: This ability was introduced in the first game, in the worlds Creative Combos and Creative Combos 2.) Players can use medals earned from completing levels to unlock costumes, music tracks, and 4-panel comic strips, and can unlock additional levels by collecting crowns.

== Reception ==
Reception

Aggregate scores
Aggregator	Score
GameRankings	81/100
Metacritic	80/100
OpenCritic	65% recommend

Review scores
Publication	Score
Destructoid	7.5/10
Game Informer	8/10
GameRevolution	4/5
IGN	7.8/10
Nintendo Life	7/10
Nintendo World Report	8.5/10

BoxBoxBoy! received positive reviews from critics. On Metacritic, the game holds a score of 80/100 based on 26 reviews. Fellow review aggregator OpenCritic assessed that the game received strong approval, being recommended by 65% of critics. Chris Carter from Destructoid gave the game a score of 7.5/10, saying that it had a "simplistic elegance". Game Informer's Kyle Hilliard gave the game an 8/10, stating that it was "remarkably similar" to its predecessor and failed to expand on the original concept, but that these were not "bad things".
