= Bye-Bye BoxBoy! =

2017 video game

- eShop key art
- Developer: HAL Laboratory
- Publisher: Nintendo
- Director: Yasuhiro Mukae
- Producers: Satoshi Mitsuhara; Keisuke Terasaki
- Artist: Yusuke Ota
- Composers: Jun Ishikawa; Hirokazu Ando
- Series: BoxBoy!
- Platform: Nintendo 3DS
- Release: JP: February 2, 2017; EU: March 23, 2017; AU: March 24, 2017; NA: April 12, 2017
- Genre: Puzzle-platform
- Mode: Single-player

Bye-Bye BoxBoy! is a 2017 puzzle-platform game developed by HAL Laboratory and published by Nintendo for the Nintendo 3DS. The third game in the BoxBoy! series, it was released worldwide in 2017. The game was followed by BoxBoy! + BoxGirl! for the Nintendo Switch in 2019.

== Gameplay ==
The player plays as Qbby, a box with legs who can create boxes out of his body. The player must solve puzzles using these boxes, which can stay on Qbby or be detached. If they remain attached to his body, Qbby can use the boxes for movement by moving to the farthest box, destroying the boxes in the process. Crowns are placed in every level, and can be collected for an added reward.

Bye-Bye BoxBoy! introduces different kinds of boxes, which appear in certain levels and have different effects depending on the type. The game also introduces Qbaby, a small box that must be escorted to the goal in certain levels. After beating the game, Challenge Worlds unlock, featuring more difficult levels.

The player can scan an amiibo of Kirby or another Kirby character to have Qbby wear a costume that makes him look like that character. Scanning the Qbby amiibo turns the entire game a shade of green that makes it look like it is being played on a Game Boy.

== Development and release ==
Bye-Bye BoxBoy! was developed by HAL Laboratory, the developers of the previous games as well as the Kirby series. The game was released for the Nintendo 3DS on April 12, 2017 in North America. In Europe, the game was released on March 23. A demo was released to promote the game, featuring levels from all three games in the series. The game also released with a Qbby amiibo, which could only be obtained in Japan.

== Reception ==
Reception

Aggregate scores
Aggregator	Score
Metacritic	83/100
OpenCritic	91% recommend

Review scores
Publication	Score
Destructoid	7/10
Game Informer	8.5/10
Nintendo Life	8/10
Nintendo World Report	8.5/10

Bye-Bye BoxBoy! received "generally favourable" reviews from professional critics according to review aggregator website Metacritic. It won the award for "Best Puzzle Game" at Game Informer's Best of 2017 Awards, while it came in last place for "Best Mobile/Handheld Game" in their Reader's Choice Best of 2017 Awards.

Casey Gibson of Nintendo World Report enjoyed the game, especially the levels featuring Qbaby, but said that the game was too similar to previous installments. CJ Andriessen of Destructoid also enjoyed the Qbabies, but complained that the power-up they give Qbby were underused. The game additionally received praise from Nintendo Life's Steve Bowling, who enjoyed the game's puzzle design and music, but he mentioned that the game was not very replayable.
