= Papyrus (Undertale) =

Undertale character

- Undertale character
- 3D render of Papyrus created for Fangamer
- First game: Undertale (2015)
- Created by: Toby Fox
- Designed by: Toby Fox; Temmie Chang

Papyrus is a character introduced in the 2015 video game Undertale. He is a skeleton with a large ego who aspires to join the Royal Guard, and also the brother of Sans and friend of Undyne. He is eternally optimistic, and despite wanting to capture the human to prove himself, finds himself befriending the human instead. He does not appear in Deltarune, but has been alluded to. He was created by Toby Fox with support from Temmie Chang. He was originally envisioned as a creepy person who wears a fedora and has no redeeming qualities, though Fox did not like this idea, so he scrapped it. His character communicates with the Papyrus typeface, which had to be changed to a "faux hand-drawn vertical script" when translated into Japanese.

Papyrus has been generally well-received, with the relationship with his brother and his personality being standout examples of his quality. Despite being a humorous character, he has also been examined for his deeper struggles by writer Cat Bussell, and identified as a favorite character from Undertale by multiple critics. He has received multiple pieces of merchandise produced by companies such as Good Smile, Fangamer, and Banpresto.

== Concept and creation ==
Sprites made by Fox before Papyrus' design was finalized by Temmie Chang. The sprite in the lower right was used as the final pose reference.

Papyrus was created by Toby Fox, the creator of Undertale. He is a skeleton who wears "Battle Body" armor, and who has a large ego. This armor was described by Fox as something resembling Captain Falcon from F-Zero and an enemy from Mega Man X. He was conceived alongside Toriel, though his concept was significantly different compared to his final version. He was going to wear a fedora, watch a show called "My Little Boney," and be creepy, lacking redeeming qualities. This incarnation was inspired by the character Dedan from the video game Off. Like in the game, the human would go on a date with him, and he would call them throughout the game. Fox was glad to have scrapped this idea, as he felt it wouldn't feel right to have such a "mean-spirited character." When working on his next incarnation, he initially did not give him eyebrows, though not for long. Fox attempted to create Papyrus' battle sprite himself but was disappointed with the outcome, so he made a sketch of Papyrus for artist Temmie Chang to turn into a sprite. Fox asked artist Guzusuru to design sprites for the date with Papyrus, but they ended up being "too good," so Fox made them himself. A Steam trading card based on Papyrus was included with a set of Undertale cards created by artist Linnet, depicting four instances of his in-game online persona posing around a plate of spaghetti, a food Papyrus frequently cooks. The image originally had English text stickers on it, but Steam had them remove it to make it internationally friendly. His theme, "Bonetrousle," was originally created for an earlier role-playing game Fox was making that he ultimately scrapped, though parts of it would later form what would become Deltarune. It would have been the regular battle theme.

Papyrus' dialogue is communicated in the papyrus font. Papyrus' existence, as well as his brother Sans, was inspired by the webcomic Helvetica, which featured a skeleton named after the typeface Helvetica. When translating Undertale into Japanese, however, this needed to be changed due to being difficult to translate. The final version had Papyrus' dialogue be communicated in a "faux hand-drawn vertical script." In Japanese, Papyrus uses the first-person pronoun "oresama" or "Papyrus-sama," owing to his "serious yet goofy nature." He also switched between gender-neutral speaking styles, such as otoko-kotoba and guntai-kotoba, and when he is speaking seriously or when speaking to Sans, he uses ikanu (older writing forms). He uses polite manners of speech when talking to superiors like Undyne, such as masu and desu forms. His dialogue towards the human becomes more polite, such as using "te" after asking for a favor.

== Appearances ==
Papyrus first appears in Undertale, an aspiring member of the Royal Guard who wishes to capture a human in order to prove his worth to Undyne, the Royal Guard's captain. When he first encounters the human in Snowdin alongside his brother, Sans. Papyrus grows conflicted, enjoying the human's company. If spared in battle, Papyrus befriends the human, later calling them on his cell phone. He also has an obsession with spaghetti, learning to cook it with his mentor, Undyne. The human may call Papyrus in nearly every room in the game, and he will give unique dialogue for each of these rooms. If flirted with in battle Papyrus offers to date the human, though he ultimately admits that he has no romantic feelings despite wanting to remain friends.

The human is later pursued by Undyne, whom Papyrus tries to convince not to hurt the human. When this fails, he attempts unsuccessfully to keep the two from fighting. After the human escapes from Undyne, Papyrus will invite them both to his spaghetti training session, though bails out with his intentions being to make Undyne and the human grow closer. Undyne admits to the human that Papyrus wasn't a good fit for the Royal Guard due to being too nice, so instead she wants to train him in other ways, such as making spaghetti. Papyrus's plan is ultimately successful, as Undyne and the human become friends. Following this, any phone call made to Papyrus in any room will have new dialogue with Undyne included.

Papyrus's fate in the ending after the human battles Asgore depends on what choices the human made; he is always present on the phone if not killed, possibly becoming the leader of the Underground. If he is killed, Sans will call the human a "dirty brother killer", or angrily ask them why they killed his brother, depending on their answer to a question. If the human hasn't gone on a date with Papyrus or kills him, the antagonist, Flowey, will either tell the player to date Papyrus or do a new playthrough without killing anyone to get a better ending. After the human visits Alphys in the True Lab on Papyrus's advice and once again confronts Asgore in battle, the battle is stopped by Toriel. They are followed by others, Papyrus included, only for Flowey to attack everyone, though the group protects the human from Flowey. Flowey takes all the monsters' souls, becoming his true form, Asriel Dreemurr. The human rescues the monsters from Asriel's control, including Papyrus. After the conflict is resolved, the group leaves the Underground due to the Barrier being broken.

While Papyrus has yet to appear in Deltarune, he has been alluded to in dialogue. In particular, Sans asks the player to help him with something in the first chapter of the game, explaining that his brother 'needs friends.' He'd planned for the two to hang out the next day, but if spoken to in Chapter 2, Sans delays the meeting by saying his brother is busy.

Papyrus has appeared in every issue of the official Undertale / Deltarune newsletter, with two interviews with him having been published as of Autumn 2024. These interviews were based on questions submitted by fans directly to Toby Fox, and often feature other characters such as Sans and Flowey. He also appeared as one of the characters who could give you a special Valentine's Day card in the Winter 2024 newsletter. Cosmetics based on him were included in Among Us, alongside other Undertale characters in the Cosmicubes event called Indie Hour.

== Promotion and reception ==
Papyrus received multiple pieces of merchandise. Good Smile produced a Nendoroid figure of him, which features different facial expressions that the owner can choose from, as well as his spaghetti and a bone. Papyrus has been featured in merchandise by Fangamer, including as part of the "Little Buddies" set of figurines. Banpresto produced multiple pieces of merchandise for Papyrus, including a keychain, an acrylic plate, and a face cushion.

Papyrus has received generally positive reception since his appearance in Undertale, with Kotaku writer Nathan Grayson identifying him as one of the most "endearing" characters in the game. While discussing Baldur's Gate 3, TechRadar writer Cat Bussell discussed Papyrus and how his "struggle is intensely human." She noted that, despite him being "comic relief," he was an "anxious soul" who wanted to be accepted. IGN writer Miranda Sanchez discussed how the date with Papyrus helped "round out" the heavier elements of the game, calling the relationship between the human and Papyrus one of the best in the game. She called the date an "essential experience" for people playing Undertale, calling it one of the best video game moments. Writer Matthew Perez felt that the date helped give Undertale its "unique charm." Writer Bonnie Ruberg discussed Papyrus' rejection of the human during their date, regarding it as notable due to video games' tendency to make romance a reward. Destructoid writer Ben Davis regarded him as his favorite new character of 2015, calling him a "cool dude and a great friend." Kotaku writer Jason Schreier was initially turned off by Papyrus, calling his "brash stupidity ... annoying [instead of] charming." However, after the final boss, where the player reexperiences moments with Papyrus among other characters, he felt himself finding him "pretty cool." The sibling relationship between Papyrus and Sans has received praise. RPGFan writer Alana Hagues felt that their distinct personalities make them a great pair. She appreciated how their humor helped "carry [her] through a tearjerker of a game" and helped her "fall in love" with the setting. Nathan Grayson enjoyed their relationship, appreciating that their humor was "natural" instead of "dickish or ugly." He discussed how, despite the fact that their personality differences could cause them to hate each other, "they have each other's backs." Conversely, hatred for the fandom also emerged in the form of "cringe-worthy videos" that frequently feature a graphic representation of the two brothers Sans and Papyrus engaging in romantic and sexual activity. It is based on anime tropes, in which sibling relationships are common, and it also parodies the idea of "forbidden love."

Writer Jason Yu felt that Papyrus' leitmotif fit his character perfectly due to its "exaggerated ups and downs," which he felt fit Papyrus' over-the-top personality. Writer Matthew Perez discussed Papyrus' music, stating that the theme "Nyeh Heh Heh!" reflects Papyrus' "strange personality" and "lack of malicious intent." He touched upon how good characters, like Papyrus, are given tonal melodies, while evil characters are not, attributing Papyrus getting this being due to his "kind-hearted characteristics." He also discussed the lack of music in Papyrus' fight during the "genocide" route of the game, feeling that it made it "particularly chilling" to kill him.
