= Dreemurr =

Dreemurr may refer to:

- Dreemurr, the surname of multiple characters in the 2015 video game Undertale as well as the 2018 video game Deltarune
  - Asgore Dreemurr, King of the Monsters in Undertale, owner of a flower shop in Deltarune.
  - Toriel Dreemurr, ex-wife of Asgore. Former Queen of the Monsters in Undertale, and a teacher in Deltarune.
  - Asriel Dreemurr, son of Asgore and Toriel, big brother of Kris in Deltarune.
  - Chara Dreemurr, adopted child of Asgore and Toriel in Undertale.
  - Kris Dreemurr, adopted child of Toriel, main protagonist of Deltarune.

== See also ==
- Dreamer (disambiguation)
