= Toriel =

Character in Undertale and Deltarune

- Undertale and Deltarune character
- 3D render of Toriel for Fangamer
- First game: Undertale (2015)
- Last appearance: Deltarune (Chapter 5, 2026)
- Created by: Toby Fox
- Designed by: Temmie Chang; Toby Fox

Toriel is a character introduced in the 2015 role-playing video game Undertale, acting as the first area boss. A motherly figure created as an embodiment of excessive video game tutorials (hence the name Toriel), she is a member of the monster race and has hanging ears, small horns, white fur, and a purple robe. As with other bosses, the player must choose between killing her and convincing her to stop fighting, dictating the overall direction of the story. She also appears in Deltarune in a different, but analogous, role.

She was designed by the game's creator, Toby Fox, as well as artist Temmie Chang, with her role inspired by Myria from Breath of Fire III. Players were initially required to kill her, but he decided to change this, leading to him introducing the ability to spare other monsters.

The character has received attention from critics and fans for her personality as well as the atypical moral choice of her boss battle. She has also received multiple pieces of merchandise, including a plush that has a small heart inside of it that can only be accessed by cutting or ripping into the plush.

== Development ==
Toriel was created by Toby Fox, the creator of Undertale, as one of its characters, receiving assistance from artist Temmie Chang. During the development of Undertale's battle system, Toriel was envisioned as "some kind of overprotective humanoid goddess," who was inspired by the character Myria from Breath of Fire III. Killing Toriel was originally mandatory to progress; however, while writing the dialogue, Toby Fox felt that killing being the only option was wrong, which lead to him introducing the ability to spare monsters. Toriel was envisioned by Fox as a "tutorial person that can't stand to see you leave". She was a "direct reaction to the absence or diminishment of mother characters in RPGs," as well as being a mockery of "aggressive tutorials," such as her literally holding the player character's hand through a puzzle.

Her initial design did not have horns, but Fox changed this due to the resemblance to the Mimiga from Cave Story, though he felt that he must have been partially inspired by them. Toriel's overworld sprites were designed by Temmie, though they went through several iterations. When looking for an artist to design Toriel's Steam trading card art, Fox wanted artist Charlie Davis to do it, having wanted to see them draw Toriel in their "signature style." Charlie jokingly commented that, when playing the Undertale demo, the only criticism they had is that the player should have been able to stay with Toriel. They noted that this wouldn't work with the narrative, but that Toriel had become unforgettable to them and appreciated the opportunity to draw her.

When designing the adult form of Toriel's son, Asriel, Toby was inspired by an "evil Toriel" design he made for a visual effects testing program. He did not know why he made the design, but wanted to do something similar in the actual game. Undertale features a truncated harder difficulty; while the game ends during Toriel's battle, Fox originally intended for it to end with Toriel hugging the human before suplexing them into the ground. Toriel's theme, "Fallen Down," was originally composed for an EarthBound soundfont collaboration album. It was conceived as a Game Over theme inspired by The Legend of Zelda. When localizing Undertale into Japanese, the game had to have changes to character dialogue and its construction. Toriel uses polite language and feminine endings in her speech, as well as putting an "O" in front of nouns to make them sound more polite. Writer Maria Christina Jørstad drew comparisons to teyodawa-kotoba and onna-kotoba, believing that this was chosen to reflect her motherly and mentor personality.

== Appearances ==
=== In Undertale ===
The player meets Toriel shortly after they fall into the Underground, where she is seen as a motherly figure who desires to protect the human, the game's player-character, from its dangers. She teaches the player the mechanics of the game, encouraging them to show mercy to enemies rather than attack them. Giving the human a phone with which to contact her, she leaves the player on their own to figure out the rest of the Ruins, after which they arrive at her house. While she attempts to take care of the human, they become restless and attempt to leave the Ruins. Having seen several human children die at the hands of Asgore, the king of the Underground, she fears for the human's safety and confronts them in battle. If the player chooses not to kill her, the battle is "long and arduous" with little indication that the player's tactics are working until she relents. She must be spared many times in order to persuade her to allow the human to leave the Ruins. If Toriel is betrayed by killing her after she relents, however, she tells the human that she regrets having tried to raise the human. If the player loads the game after battling Toriel to view an alternate outcome, Flowey appears and mocks the player for their actions, establishing the use of saved games as a plot element in Undertale. If she is killed upon killing 20 randomly-encountered enemies in the Ruins, she remarks that she wasn't protecting the human from the rest of the Underground, she was protecting the rest of the Underground by attempting to keep the human in the Ruins. Doing this causes the game to go down a darker "no mercy" (often called "Genocide") route for as long as the human continues to kill all of the enemies they encounter.

It is later revealed that Toriel was once Asgore's wife, and they had a son, Asriel. When Asriel died, she gave up her crown due to her disgust at Asgore's decision to kill human children for their souls in order to break the "Barrier" keeping the monsters trapped in the Underground. Near the end of the True Pacifist story route, Toriel arrives at "New Home" (The Underground's capital) and stops Asgore and the human from fighting. However, Flowey appears and absorbs her soul along with that of all the other monsters in the Underground to gain the form of "Asriel, the God of Hyper-Death". Later on, after the player has fought Asriel, who uses the human souls and his immense power to break the Barrier, Toriel and the other monsters leave the Underground, returning to the Surface. Toriel offers to provide a home for the human; the player can choose to accept or reject this, which leads to a differing post-credits scene depending on the choice. The non-playable True Pacifist epilogue shows that Toriel achieves her dream of founding and teaching at a school.

=== In Deltarune ===
In Deltarune, Toriel is the adoptive mother of the player character, Kris, and the biological mother of Asriel. She is implied to be a teacher for a younger class at Kris' school. She wakes Kris up at the beginning of Chapter 1 and drops them off at school. After returning from the Dark World, Kris is chastised by Toriel for being late. However, she is pleased to hear that Kris has made a friend, and allows Kris to explore the town before coming home.

In the game's second chapter, she can be seen conversing with Alphys about Kris' well-being during the prologue; in the epilogue, she invites Susie into the Dreemurr household, and suggests that she spend the night after she realizes that her car tires had been slashed. However, in a twist, Kris opens a Dark Fountain that engulfs all three of them.

In Chapter 3, she is asleep inside a toy capsule held by the antagonist Tenna for the entirety of the chapter. Near the end of the chapter, the Roaring Knight attempts to kidnap Toriel but is foiled by Undyne who is kidnapped by the Roaring Knight instead.

In Chapter 4, she brings Kris and Susie to church. After service at church she goes home to prepare for choir practice but instead stays home due to the ensuing rainy weather. At the end of the chapter Kris and Susie returns home to find a drunk Toriel dancing with Sans. The two continues being loud and playing music, much to Kris' annoyance.

In Chapter 5, Toriel is asleep on the living room armchair, likely hungover, and wakes up when Kris approaches; if interacted with, she admits to getting "carried away" the night prior and apologizes. Later, during the Festival, she is spotted by Kris, Susie and Noelle while doing gardening in the yard; Susie, upset, suggests the trio "leave her alone".

== Promotion and reception ==
Fallen Down
Toriel's theme "Fallen Down" is the second most streamed song by Toby Fox on Spotify after Megalovania. It has over 200 million streams, making it one of the most streamed video game songs ever on the platform.

An official Toriel plush was released by Fangamer. The plush contains a white heart soul inside, which can only be found if the plush is cut apart. This detail reflects her death scene in Undertale, and was described by Kotaku as "weirdly unsettling". The plush was designed by Toby Fox, who made a point of making her cuter. A figure of Toriel was also released by Fangamer as part of the "Little Buddies" set. A Nendoroid has also been released, coming with a pie accessory.

Since appearing in Undertale, Toriel has received generally positive reception. Kill Screen writer Jess Joho described the character as "relying on the inhumanly selfless portrait of motherhood", but doing so with a purpose, praising the boss encounter with her as respecting the player's ability to think through a problem, as well as their basic instincts as a human being. RPGFan writer Alana Hagues appreciated how kind and selfless she was, calling her "the epitome of Undertale's theme of kindness and forgiveness." Writer Arthur Conzi Zeferino discussed how Toriel and Asgore's attacks contrast with one another; where Toriel's attacks are weaker and she will avoid killing the human, Asgore's similar attacks are violent and determined.

Toriel and Asgore share similarities in their music; they both use chiptune music, strings, and tambourines. Additionally, they both use what writer Jason Yu described as "Royal Ostinato," a low repeating figure, found in both "Heartache" and "ASGORE". Yu noted that these have different time signatures, which he appreciated for highlighting the "rhythmic difference between" these songs. Writer Matthew Perez found some interactions with Toriel, namely her dismissing the human's desire to go home with "This… this IS your home now" as "disturbing" and "manipulation," which he said made her motivations questionable. He discussed how the encounter with her before her fight made to feel "awry" due to the above-mentioned "uncharacteristic behavior" and the "atmospheric, intermittent, and low-pitched percussive sound," stating that it conveyed to the player that this was a "crucial decision-making moment." He discussed "Heartache," stating that the "complexity of this track complements the puzzling nature" of the battle.

The decision regarding killing or sparing Toriel has been the subject of commentary. Jess Joho stated that the game holds up a mirror to "patriarchal" game design that encourages players to impatiently "sacrifice their own mother and humanity" rather than engaging with the enemy on a "human level". Kotaku writer Nathan Grayson stated that while he killed Toriel during his playthrough, his encounter with her made him cry due to her friendliness and relatability as a character. He also praised the game for remembering this on his next playthrough. Julie Muncy of Kill Screen criticized the encounter with Toriel as unintuitive, saying that she lost the ability to trust the game after being seemingly forced to kill Toriel, which forced her onto the game's "Neutral" route. Writer Alexandra Müller discussed how Toriel serves as the tutorial for the spare versus kill mechanic of Undertale, and that the fight with her is the culmination of the lessons Toriel teaches. They speak of how, after defeating Toriel, a long hallway and a moment of silence punctuates it, which is contrasted with the battle against Asgore, where the same thing occurs. They also spoke of how Toriel's soul breaking, visually represented as a broken heart, may invoke memories where players hurt their own mother, stating that it makes her death "universally recognizable" and "personal." When discussing killing Toriel, writer Jens Kjeldgaard-Christiansen noted that the way Flowey chastised and mocked the player if they reset after killing Toriel to try to spare her could be read as a criticism of the "save-load mentality," acknowledging the guilt that drives this "presuppose[s] the player's deliberative engagement with the game's fictional world." This moment was regarded as among the best fourth-wall-breaking moments in video games. RPGSite writer Elizabeth Henges discussed having killed Toriel because she felt she needed to "prove [herself]," calling it an "eye-opening moment" when Flowey chastised her after resetting. Writer Joul Couture discussed killing Toriel, talking about his regrets for having done so due to the compassion Toriel offered the human. He also touched upon how players feel the urge to progress a story at any cost, which was true for him with Toriel. He discussed how Toriel's attacks were more powerful and vicious than anything he'd encountered, which spurred him to fight back. He noted how video games are often free of consequences, and how Undertale differs from that, comparing it to saying something to a loved one that they regret for the rest of their life.

Writer Frederic Seraphie discussed how the battle seemed to be guiding the player to killing Toriel; despite her advising the human to not kill, the way to avoid killing Toriel seemed obtuse. He also suggested that the song being called "Heartache" suggested that players were intended to kill her. He described that the choice of killing Toriel or quitting the game resembled the Derridean idea of impossibility. He conducted a survey on players to determine how they handled the Toriel fight, having come to the conclusion that, despite the "confidence interval being too large" to confirm, a majority of players ended up killing Toriel without meta knowledge that she could survive. He also found that the discovery that Toriel was not intending to kill them made players feel guilt for fighting her.
