= Undyne =

Character in Undertale and Deltarune

- Undertale and Deltarune character
- 3D render of Undyne created for Fangamer
- First game: Undertale (2015)
- Last appearance: Deltarune (Chapter 3, 2025)
- Created by: Toby Fox
- Designed by: Toby Fox; Temmie Chang

Undyne is a fictional character in the 2015 video game Undertale and episodic video game Deltarune. In Undertale, she is a monster who serves as the captain of the Royal Guard of the Underground under its king, Asgore. She is initially an antagonist to the player character, but depending on the player's actions over the course of the game, she may become their ally, their rival or their nemesis. If the player makes a point of killing every monster possible, Undyne will transform into Undyne the Undying upon death, vowing to destroy the player in order to save all other life from their actions. She is a lesbian, revealed to be in love with Alphys.

Undyne appears in the subsequent game Deltarune as the town's chief of police in the light world, a role unrelated to the one she has in Undertale, since she has no memory of or connection to any Undertale characters and does not wear an eyepatch.

Since her appearance in Undertale, she has been met with positive reception. Undyne's sexuality, as well as her relationship with Alphys, were praised by critics for how they were depicted. She was considered one of the best characters in and out of Undertale, particularly as a female character. Her boss fights were also praised, with Game Informer citing the "genocide" route boss fight against her as one of the game's best. Her music was also discussed, with critics and writers discussing how her music reflects her personality and actions. She has been depicted in multiple pieces of merchandise, including a Nendoroid figure from Good Smile and multiple pieces from Fangamer.

== Concept and creation ==
Undyne was originally envisioned as resembling the Axem Rangers from Super Mario RPG

Toby Fox created the character for the video game Undertale with input from other artists such as Temmie Chang. In initial iterations, Undyne was meant to look more fish-like. Other designs created by Temmie resembled an Axem Ranger's head from Super Mario RPG per Fox's vision. Undyne is a lesbian monster who serves as the captain of the Royal Guard of the Underground under its king, Asgore, tasked with getting a player's soul to free the monsters there. She is first seen in a full suit of armor and when her helmet is removed she is shown to be a fish woman with red hair pulled back in a ponytail, blue skin, fangs, and a patch over one eye. She fights with a blue spear and can summon energy spears as well. When not in her armor, she is seen wearing a tank top and pants.

Fox had difficulty settling on her final characterization and appearance. He tried various accents and hobbies, such as fashion and singing, but was not satisfied. The only consistent detail was that she would be the first boss to try to kill the protagonist. Her final characterization only materialized once he began writing her monologue before she battles with the protagonist. At this point, Fox found her natural to write. Her face and body were also difficult to settle on.

== Appearances ==
=== In Undertale ===
In Undertale, she appears as an antagonist to the protagonist, the player, attempting to kill them in order to extract their soul and use it to free the monsters from the Underground to fulfill Asgore's plans. She is also the lover of Alphys, who she met in the dump. She pursues the player throughout Waterfall and eventually challenges them to a duel. The player cannot spare her. They either fight Undyne or run away and if they flee far enough, they can escape. Depending on the player's actions before fighting Asgore, Undyne's ending will change. Certain player actions will result in Undyne befriending the player through a cooking date where Undyne realizes that the player has a kind heart.

In the game's true ending route, Undyne asks the player to deliver a love letter to Alphys, who assumes the letter is from the player and goes on a date with them. Undyne shows up during the date and Alphys admits her feelings to Undyne, at which point they talk out their feelings. After the player learns more about Alphys' past and reencounters Asgore, Undyne and other monsters show up to stop the fight. However, the antagonist Flowey shows up, taking the monsters' souls and assuming his true form as Asriel Dreemurr, forcing the player to defeat him and rescue the souls of Undyne and the others. After managing to pacify Asriel, the player is able to break the barrier, freeing the monsters from the Underground. During the end credits, Undyne and Alphys are seen at the beach, where Undyne kisses Alphys. If the player instead makes a point of killing every monster possible before fighting Undyne, a child named Monster Kid, who had been trying to befriend the player, finds themselves nearly dying by the player's hands; however, Undyne steps in the way, nearly dying in the process. Due to an abundance of "Determination," the quality that allows the player to survive death, she manages to survive, transforming into Undyne the Undying and vowing to destroy the player in order to save monsters, players, and all other life.

=== In Deltarune ===
Undyne, as she appears in the Light World (left) and Dark Worlds (right) in Deltarune

Undyne also appears in Deltarune, a video game featuring multiple characters from Undertale. She is now the chief of police of Hometown in Deltarune's light world instead of a knight. It is later explained that she acquired the position after Asgore was removed from it for unknown reasons. Undyne also has no memory of Alphys, and does not wear an eyepatch on her right eye, making both her eyes visible. At the end of Chapter 3, Undyne attempts to arrest the Roaring Knight as they attempt to capture Toriel. However the Roaring Knight abducts and imprisons her in a dark world located in the shelter. In Chapter 4 Susie seeks to rescue her while Kris seems to not want the player and the other characters to have access to the shelter.

=== In other media ===
In a 2023 collaboration, the 2018 video game Among Us added several character-themed cosmetics based on Undertale. Players could dress in Undyne’s suit of armor, her signature red ponytail, and a visor that made the player appear they were wielding her magical spear. These items granted no competitive advantages.

== Promotion and reception ==
Undyne has been depicted in merchandize multiple times. Good Smile released a Nendoroid figure of her, which included accessories. Fangamer a plush toy designed by Audrey Waner, a "Little Buddy" figure, a cloth face mask, music tracks from the game (including an Undyne medley remix) all based on her, as well as a storage pouch based on Waterfall and multiple sets of stickers and sticky notes based on her and other Undertale characters Banpresto produced various pieces of Undertale merchandise, including an acrylic figure of Undyne.

She has received generally positive reception. Kotaku writer Kirk Hamilton called her one of Undertale's most memorable characters. IGN staff praised her for having a charm which comes from being able to see her as a "fairly intimidating" opponent, or "hero of the game," or someone who cares deeply for those she loves, depending on gameplay style. Writer Evan Marzahn similarly discussed Undyne's changing dynamic, highlighting how characters could be both good or bad, and how the genocide route makes Undyne serve as a heroic character against the player's villainous nature.

Multiple critics have considered her among the best female characters. Game Informer writer Elise Favis named Undyne as one of her favorite female characters of 2015 and one of the best Undertale characters. She praised her for being "at times terrifying and merciless." Polygon writer Allegra Frank also regarded her as one of the best video game women of 2015, saying that she was the best female character to choose from in Undertale. She praised her character arc, going from an antagonizer who is "frightening and merciless" to having more depth. She discussed Undyne's reluctance to accept the player's friendship, as well as discussing how her romantic interest in Alphys helps drive players towards completing the "true pacifist" route. She also appreciated how she has a "no-holds-barred approach to everything," as well as her having her own vulnerabilities and insecurities despite that, finding her arc among Undertale's "most compelling." She has also been praised as a favorite LGBTQ character by multiple critics, including Nintendo Life writer Kate Gray. In an article celebrating LGBTQ representation in video games, RPGFan writer Stephanie Sybydlo regarded the relationship between Undyne and Alphys as best encapsulating the article, encouraging Undertale players to help ensure that they get together. Writer Max Delsohn discussed their gender journey and how they reacted negatively to certain media, including what they describe as "Alphys and Undyne's easy, lesbian love in a whimsical, faraway world" due to the complications they were undergoing.

Undyne's boss fights and music have been well-received. Elise Favis identified her boss fight as one of the best, giving additional praise to her battle theme. The boss battle in the genocide route Undyne was considered a favorite by Game Informer writer Daniel Tack. Writer Matthew Perez discussed how Undyne and her music contrasted the earlier game's "whimsical aesthetics," calling her first theme - "Undyne" - "haunting and threatening" - which he felt matched Undyne. He discussed how "Waterfall" using elements later associated with Undyne helped "create a relationship between [Undyne] and current gaming environment." He later talked about the genocide route, talking about how Undyne's selfless actions of protecting Monster Kid with her life contrasted the protagonist's selfish actions, representing Toby Fox's interest in clarifying the "notions of good and evil." He noted that, despite her violent nature, she is given tonal tracks due to the "purported noble intentions with which they operate." When analyzing Undyne's leitmotif, writer Jason Yu noted that it appeared well before her actual theme in other themes such as her first encounter, as well as the themes of Waterfall and the Ruins. He discussed her Undyne the Undying theme, "Battle Against a True Hero," feeling it represents Undyne after she has been "maxed out, stretched to her limits." He also pointed out that Undyne's theme, similar to the other two female characters (Toriel and Alphys), have a triple meter for their themes, as opposed to the male characters, whose themes are in common time. Writer Tobias Salte Klausen discussed the concept of ludonarrative resonance semiotic metaphor, citing examples such as Undyne's attacks growing more sluggish in battle, suggesting Undyne was growing more weary. They also cited how the ability to run away was removed during this fight, requiring players to follow Undyne's comment about needing to face her head on so long as the player's heart is locked in place. They noted that Undyne is the first boss character where the player lacked an emotional connection to, contrasting Papyrus and Toriel, and that they only get to see their perspective once they begin the battle with Undyne.
