= Sans (Undertale) =

Character in Undertale and Deltarune

- Undertale and Deltarune character
- 3D render of Sans created for Fangamer
- First game: Undertale (2015)
- Last appearance: Deltarune (Chapter 5, 2026)
- Created by: Toby Fox
- Designed by: Toby Fox; Temmie Chang

Sans is a character in the 2015 video game Undertale. He is the brother of Papyrus and initially appears as a friendly NPC with an easy-going, laid-back personality. Sans is also featured in the episodic video game Deltarune, where he can primarily be found at his shop, which is a remodeled version of Grillby's Diner from the original game. Sans was created by Toby Fox with support from the artist Temmie Chang. The character's name is based on the Comic Sans font, which is used for most of his in-game dialogue. This sans typeface was replaced with a "cutesy irreverent typeface" in the Japanese version of the game.

Critics and fans have praised Sans' characterization. In particular, Sans has been recognized for his humor and his boss fight, including its musical theme, "Megalovania". Sans has been used as an internet meme and has been the subject of several user-created mods and other projects. His likeness also appears as a customizable skin for Mii Gunner in Nintendo's fighting game Super Smash Bros. Ultimate, as well as being featured in merchandise produced by companies such as Good Smile, Fangamer, and Banpresto.

== Concept and design ==
Concept art by Chang based on Fox's sketches

Sans was conceived by Toby Fox, the creator of Undertale. Fox has said he created Sans with "special inspiration" from J. N. Wiedle, author of the webcomic Helvetica—a series about an eponymous skeleton named after the Helvetica typeface. Fox made the initial concept sketch for the character on a college notebook, and he initially named him "Comic Sans" after the typeface. At this stage, the character was simply referred to as the brother of the game's second boss, Papyrus, who was similarly named after a typeface. When Fox first conceived the character, he intended for Sans to make more skeleton puns, but ultimately did not think this was humorous enough, so he dropped the idea. Fox also collaborated with Temmie Chang on the design. Chang remarked that the character looked like he appeared to have been playing poker at the casino. For the boss battle against Sans, Fox chose to use "Megalovania", a song that had previously been used within Homestuck and in one of Fox's EarthBound ROM hacks. Artist Drak designed a Steam trading card based on Sans that came packaged with a collection of Undertale cards. Fox thought it would be intriguing if Sans was absent from the card itself and could only be seen in full view dozing over to the side. Since he was unsure if Steam would accept a card with nothing but blank black space, he added the spotlight to the center of the image. Fox has expressed his hope that Sans' "sleepy presence will continue to surprise someone every once in a while".

As with his brother, Papyrus, Sans is one of the characters whose dialogue is not normally shown using the game's default font. Instead, his words are usually displayed in Comic Sans. (When he tells the player about the mechanics of the game, or when he threatens the player, his words then use the default font.) When adapting Undertale into Japanese, however, this convention had to be changed, as it was too difficult to translate. The final Japanese version had Sans' dialogue communicated in a "cutesy irreverent typeface" that one might find used in stylized advertisements or on a television variety show.

Maria Christina Jørstad has written about the style of language used by Sans in the Japanese version of Undertale and what it shows about him. In Japanese, Sans refers to himself in as "Sanzu" (サンズ), which Jørstad connects to the Sanzu River: a symbolic river that separates life from death, and that judges those that pass it. As Jørstad says, this symbolism relates to Sans' role in judging the player at the end of the game. Jørstad also explains Sans' style of speech. When communicating to his friends, Sans uses Japanese pronouns that seem "childish", such as oira, anta, and occasionally omae. Sans is often paired with his brother, Papyrus. When he is being serious or conversing with his brother, he sometimes uses omae, but he also uses the more "serious" ore and other similar sentence finals like sa and na. When he first meets the main character in the woods, Sans uses Japanese expressions from "Kansai ben"—a dialect of Kansai that is associated with comic characters. He does this only once, speaking the standard dialect in other contexts. Sans practices his new puns, and the characters have an absurd–comic relationship known as "boke/tsukkomi". He then speaks yakuwarigo-style language, sounding something like a male anime or manga character with very masculine expressions such as ze, zo, sa and other "macho" forms. However, in contrast to the "macho male" stereotype, Sans probably comes across, to a Japanese speaker, as less "commando" and more just like a 'goofy' boy because of his persistent use of the childish oira and anta.

== Appearances ==
=== In Undertale ===
Prior to the events of Undertale, Sans had moved with his brother, Papyrus, from an unknown location to the settlement in Snowdin. Papyrus has been hired as a royal guard trainee sentry, and he forces his brother to help in his quest to capture a human. Sans follows the player throughout most of the forest of Snowdin, commentating on his brother's puzzles and interacting with the player. Sans continues to appear as a recurring character throughout the rest of the game, often appearing at sentry posts to make jokes and sell items. Near the climax of the game, Sans invites the player to eat at a restaurant with him, where he explains how he befriended Toriel behind the large door in Snowdin. He reveals that he has promised not to kill any humans who come to the Underground, and, if he had not made that promise, the player would be "dead where [they] stand".

In the "Last Corridor" (a room near the end of the game), Sans makes one more appearance where he reveals the true meaning of the "EXP" and "LV" values that the player has accumulated throughout the game: "Execution Points" and "Level of Violence", respectively. He then judges the player for their accumulated EXP and LV values, before disappearing and allowing the player to proceed and fight the king, Asgore. The dialogue changes once the player beats the last boss, based on what has happened previously in the game.

As the game progresses, Sans' behavior is modified to fit different scenarios, based on how often the player opts to kill the monsters in each area. If the player has initiated the game's "Genocide" route, Sans appears before the Papyrus boss fight and threatens the player with a "bad time" if they proceed with their actions. If the player ignores this warning, Sans again confronts the player in the Last Corridor, to prevent them from destroying the entire Underground, and acting as the route's final boss. During the boss battle sequence with Sans, the song "Megalovania" plays.

=== In other games ===
Outside of Undertale, Sans appears as a character in the episodic Deltarune, where he can be found at his shop, a remodeled version of Grillby's Diner from Undertale. For the Nintendo game Super Smash Bros. Ultimate (2018), a Sans costume for the playable Mii Gunner character was released as downloadable content on September 4, 2019. In the online game Among Us (2018), Sans' hoodie appears as a cosmetic belonging to the Cosmicube event called "Indie Hour", which also featured other characters from Undertale. In 2022, Sans appeared in the Japanese rhythm game Pop'n Music Unilab.

== Promotion and reception ==
=== Merchandising ===
Sans has appeared in a variety of merchandise offered by different companies. Good Smile produced a Nendoroid figure of him that featured different poses and accessories. Fangamer featured Sans in series of Undertale figurines. Banpresto has also produced Sans-related merchandise, including a key chain, an acrylic plate, and a face cushion.

=== Critical reception ===
Since his appearance in Undertale, Sans has received generally positive reception. He has been well-received by Undertale fans, being the subject of many fan works and projects such as games, video game mods, and other creations. (Note: Sources that cited various fan works and projects about Sans include:) During the Undertale Q&A in 2016, Sans and Papyrus were the characters that received the most questions from fans. Polygon staff writer Colin Campbell described Sans as one of the best video game characters of the 2010s. Campbell particularly praised how the game highlights Sans' humor: "When he makes a joke, the camera zooms in on him while he winks. It never gets old." Destructoid writer CJ Andriessen—who thought that he was too late to play Undertale—wrote that Sans' appearance in Smash Bros. had increased his desire to try the game.

The character of Sans has also been discussed by Gabriel Elvery, a postdoctoral research student with an interest in fantasy video games, in a research paper entitled "Undertale's Loveable Monsters: Investigating Parasocial Relationships with Non-Player Characters". The paper explains how parasocial relationships (PSRs) are developed with the non-player characters (NPCs) Sans and Flowey. As described by Elvery, Undertale includes PSRs—like with Sans—as an "integral function" of the player's experience. During various moments of playthrough, parasocial interactions (PSIs) with Sans create the sense of a "shared history" that, in turn, creates a sense of community. Throughout the different game routines, an unconventional portrayal of Sans the "monster" goes against typical attitudes towards NPCs in other games: Sans is more a "lovable monster", rather than something just to fear and kill. Though he may appear "threatening at first", the paper explains how Sans "only becomes dangerous should the character treat him, and the monsters, as a threat by using violence against them". As argued by Elvery, the interactions with Sans encourage the player to take care in their treatment of the game world, and PSIs foster a sense of mutual understanding. Sans helps players to "integrate into the Underground ... and act morally". By fostering the PSR with Sans (and Flowey), the game pushes the player to become more aware of the similarity between "our relationships with people and our relationship to technology": both relationships may require learning how to act mindfully and questioning of established procedures.

In addition, the sibling relationship between Papyrus and Sans has been explored and praised. RPGFan writer Alana Hagues felt that the two brothers' distinct personalities make them a great pair. She appreciated how their humor helped "carry [her] through a tearjerker of a game" and helped her "fall in love" with the setting. Nathan Grayson of Kotaku identifies Papyrus and Sans as two of Undertale's most "endearing" characters. He writes about his enjoyment of their relationship, and how he appreciated that their humor was "natural" instead of "dickish or ugly". He discussed how, despite the fact that their personality differences could cause them to sometimes hate each other, "they have each other's backs". Conversely, the YouTuber Markiplier quit playing after two episodes, after he was harassed by fans due to the way he played the game, specifically for giving Sans a "redneck voice". Hatred for the fandom has also appeared in the form of what have been described as "cringe-worthy videos" that feature a graphic representation of the two brothers, Sans and Papyrus, sometimes engaging in romantic and sexual activity. These anti-fan-videos have included anime tropes, in which sibling relationships are common; they have also parodied the idea of "forbidden love".

Sans' boss fight and its theme, "Megalovania", have been well-received. (Note: Sources that praised Sans' boss fight and its theme, Megalovania, include:) The inclusion of Sans as a Mii fighter costume in Super Smash Bros. Ultimate, as well as the special remixed version of "Megalovania", garnered positive feedback from fans. Along with the song's popularity, the character itself became an Internet meme with multiple incarnations. The song was also played at the Vatican as part of a papal audience circus act for Pope Francis. In 2020, the Australian television network ABC News used the "sans." Undertale OST theme when discussing the origins of coronavirus and its impact on life in China.

In a paper titled Ethics at Play in Undertale (2018), author Frederic Seraphie compared the battle with Sans to breaking the fourth wall. He also discussed how 'genocide' happens during the game, notably in the fight with Sans. Seraphie considered this final boss battle as a metaphorical way to "break" Undertale and concluded that it had the most discordant story-line of the game.

=== References in popular media ===
In 2015, Ben Davis of Destructoid praised Sans's unexpected appearance on The 700 Club, a Christian television program hosted by Pat Robertson. The show had received a viewer's question that referred to "several pictures of a strange cartoon skeleton with one glowing blue eye and wearing a hoodie". In answer to the question, Davis confidently confirmed that this was, indeed, Sans from Undertale. He also stated: "How could anyone find such a lovable scamp like Sans demonic?" In 2019, professional wrestler Kenny Omega expressed his love for Undertale by dressing as Sans for the October 30 episode of All Elite Wrestling: Dynamite.

On September 8, 2022, Sans was chosen as the "Ultimate Tumblr Sexyman" (Note: Referencing an online slang term for fictional characters who garner romantic and/or sexual interest from a large fanbase despite not being conventionally attractive.) via a three-day tournament bracket of polls on Twitter. Sans was a finalist with Mob Psycho 100 character Arataka Reigen, whom Sans surpassed with 50.1% of the vote. Toby Fox responded to the results by writing a short fan fiction that humorously dramatized Reigen's attempts at surpassing Sans in the poll. In the piece, Fox wrote that "Sans won by doing literally nothing, while Reigen cheated his way to the finals, only to come against the hard truth that Tumblr is not into conventionally attractive men". The close victory of Sans also caused an influx of fan art and memes on both Twitter and Tumblr. The "Ultimate Tumblr Sexyman" poll ended on the same day as the death of Elizabeth II, leading to jokes connecting the two events.
