= Skeleton (undead) =

Undead creature

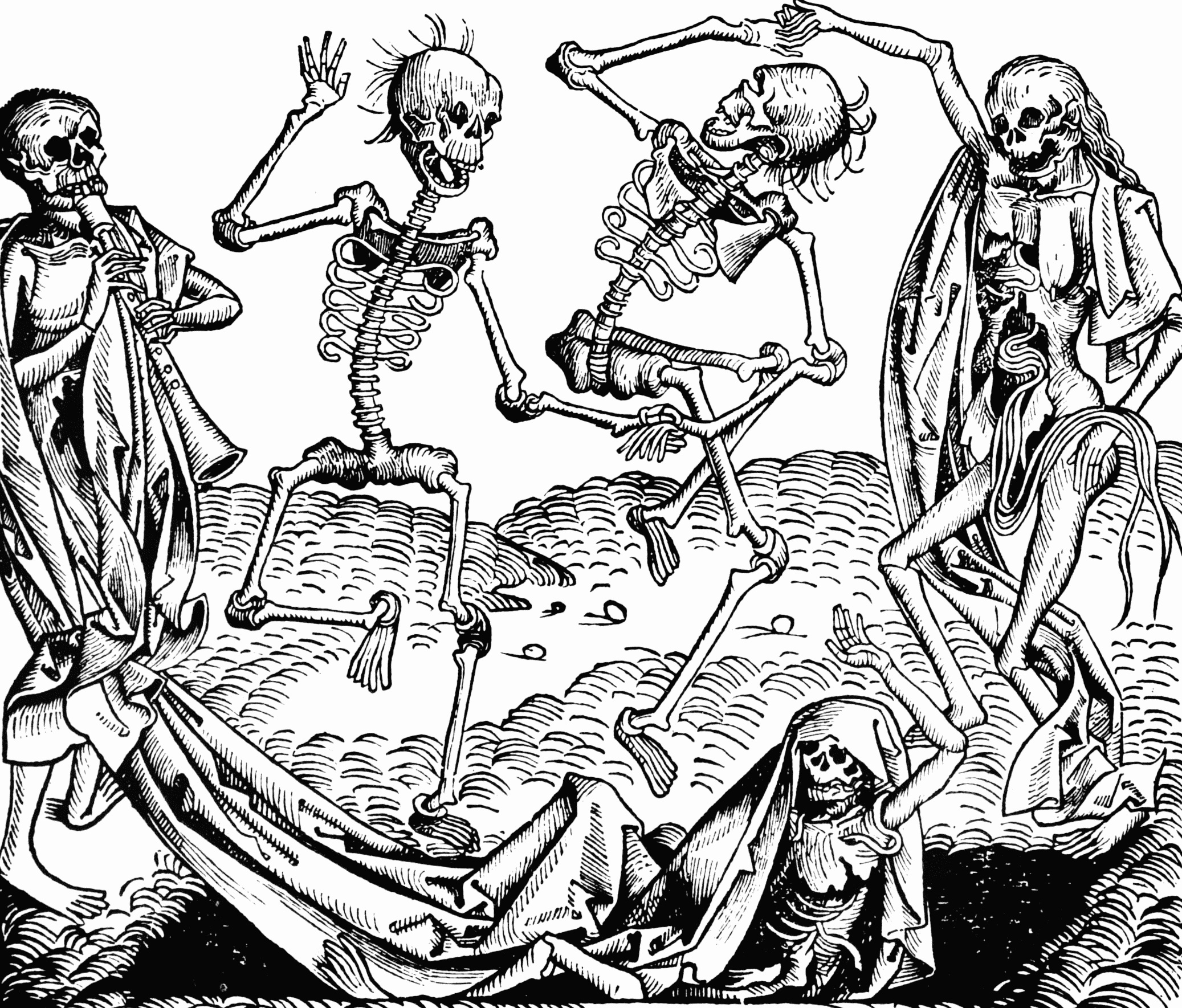
Animated skeletons in The Dance of Death (1493), a woodcut by Michael Wogemut, from the Liber chronicarum by Hartmann Schede.

A skeleton is a type of physically manifested undead often found in fantasy, gothic, and horror fiction, as well as mythology, folklore, and various kinds of art. Most are human skeletons, but they can also be from any species found on Earth or in the fantasy world.

== Myth and folklore ==
Animated human skeletons have been used as a personification of death in Western culture since the Middle Ages, a personification perhaps influenced by the valley of the dry bones in the Book of Ezekiel. The Grim Reaper is often depicted as a hooded skeleton holding a scythe (and occasionally an hourglass), which has been attributed to Hans Holbein the Younger (1538). Death as one of the biblical horsemen of the Apocalypse has been depicted as a skeleton riding a horse. The Triumph of Death is a 1562 painting by Pieter Bruegel the Elder depicting an army of skeletons raiding a town and slaughtering its occupants.

"The Story of the Youth Who Went Forth to Learn What Fear Was" is a Brothers Grimm fairy tale in which a boy named Hans joins a circle of dancing skeletons.

In Japanese folklore, Mekurabe are rolling skulls with eyeballs who menace Taira no Kiyomori.

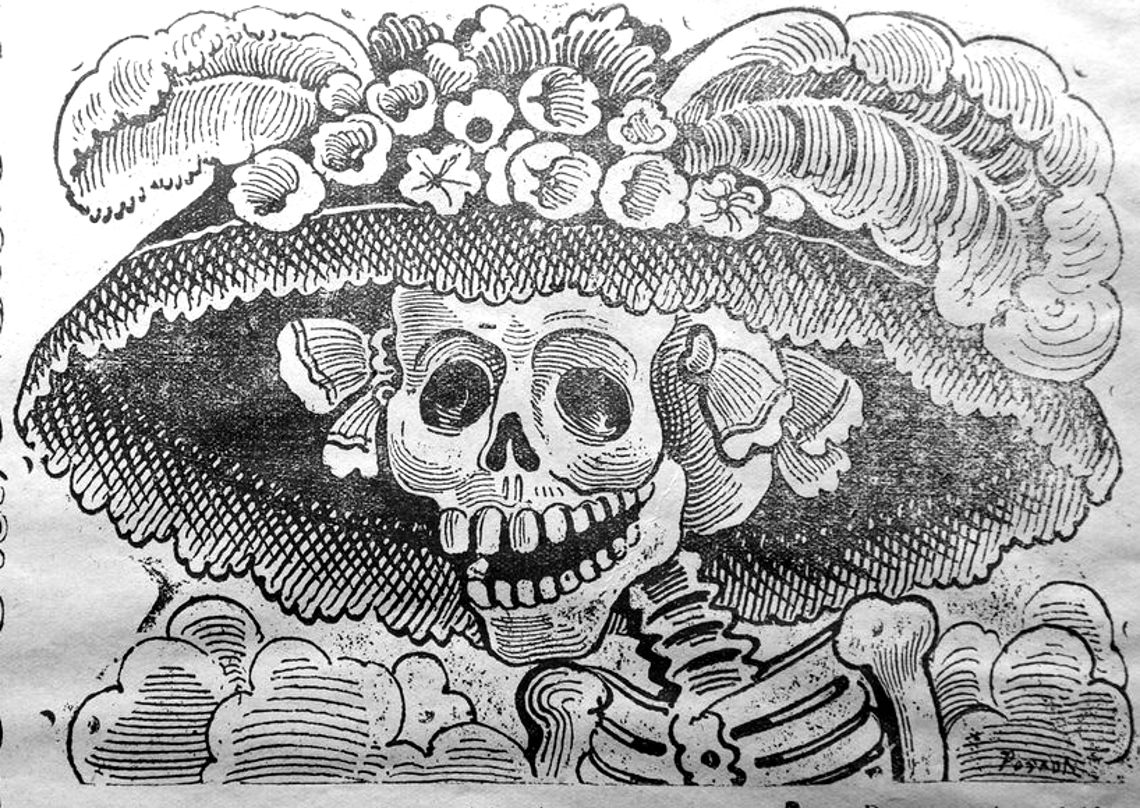
José Guadalupe Posada's 1913 La Calavera Catrina zinc etching

=== Mexico ===
Figurines and images of skeletons doing routine things are common in Mexico's Day of the Dead celebration, where skulls symbolize life and their familiar circumstances invite levity. Highly decorated sugar-skull candy has become one of the most recognizable elements of the celebrations. They are known in Mexico as calacas, a Mexican Spanish term simply meaning "skeleton". The modern association between skeleton iconography and the Day of the Dead was inspired by La Calavera Catrina, a zinc etching created by Mexican cartoonist José Guadalupe Posada in the 1910s and published posthumously in 1930. Initially a satire of Mexican women who were ashamed of their indigenous origins and dressed imitating the French style, wearing heavy makeup to make their skin look whiter, it later became a more general symbol of vanity. During the 20th century, the Catrina entrenched itself in the Mexican consciousness and became a national icon, often depicted in folk art.

== Modern fiction ==
=== Literature ===
- The animated skeleton features in some Gothic fiction. One early example is in the short story "Thurnley Abbey" (1908) by Perceval Landon, originally published in his collection Raw Edges. It is reprinted in many modern anthologies, such as The 2nd Fontana Book of Great Ghost Stories and The Penguin Book of Horror Stories.
- An anthropomorphic depiction of Death which looks like a skeleton in a black robe appears in almost all volumes of Terry Pratchett's fantasy series Discworld, including five novels where he is the lead character.
- One of the main characters in the manga One Piece, Brook, is a pirate who ate the Revive-Revive Fruit, which allowed him to come back from death as a skeleton.

=== Film and TV ===
- Undead skeletons have been portrayed in fantasy films such as The 7th Voyage of Sinbad (1958), The Black Cauldron (1985), Army of Darkness (1992), The Nightmare Before Christmas (1993), The Lost Skeleton of Cadavra (2001), and Corpse Bride (2005)
- An extended battle scene against an army of skeletal warriors was produced by animator Ray Harryhausen for Jason and the Argonauts (1963) and is remembered as one of the most sophisticated and influential visual effects sequences of its day.
- Undead skeletons always appear as funny characters in Thai fantasy folk television dramas. They are often referred to as "Na Phi" ("uncle ghost").

=== Games ===
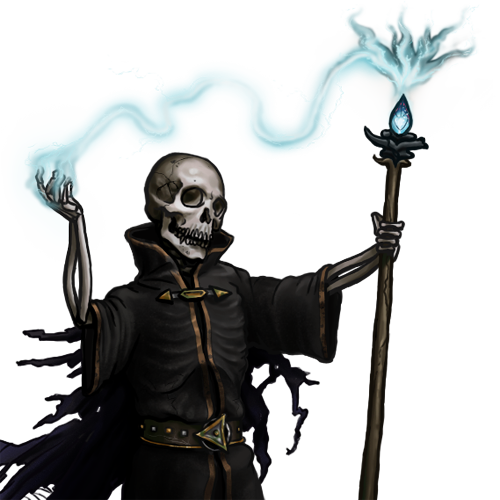
An undead skeleton character from the fantasy video game The Battle for Wesnoth.

- Animated skeletons have been used and portrayed extensively in fantasy role-playing games. In a tradition that goes back to the pen-and-paper game Dungeons & Dragons, the basic animated skeleton is commonly employed as a low-level undead enemy, typically easy for a player to defeat in combat. Thus, in games which make use of them, such enemies often appear relatively early in the gameplay and are considered a suitable opponent for novice players. In these contexts, they are commonly armed with medieval weapons and sometimes wear armor. Environmental humanities scholar Matthew Chrulew commented on skeletons, as well as other undead and vermin in D&D "figure the abject and excluded", representing "most clearly a bare life [as coined by Giorgio Agamben] that may be killed without hesitation; violence against such wholly other creatures is completely deproblematized."
- In the PlayStation action-adventure series MediEvil, the protagonist is an animated skeleton knight named Sir Daniel Fortesque.
- In the 1999 cult classic Planescape: Torment, Morte is a character who joins the protagonist on his quest and is essentially a sentient, levitating human skull with intact eyeballs who cracks wise and fights by biting.
- In the 2011 Minecraft video game, skeletons appear as bow-wielding monsters that shoot players with their bows and burn under the sunlight unless they wear helmets. Sometimes the skeletons spawn with stronger bows, random armor, or can even be summoned by players in a world with cheats enabled to wield a melee weapon, or no weapon at all. Variants include the Wither Skeleton, a taller and darker variant found in Nether Fortresses which causes the player's health points to wither away; the Stray, a frozen variant found in snowy biomes that causes slowness; the Bogged, a variant covered with slime or fungus found in swamp and mangrove swamp biomes that shoots poison arrows; and the Parched, a linen-wrapped variant found in desert biomes that causes weakness. In the spinoff game Minecraft Dungeons, there also exists a variant that acts as the guards of The Nameless One, a necromancer boss enemy and the king of the undead. In this form, they are equipped with glaives, shields, and iron armor, and are referred to as Skeleton Vanguards.
- In the video game Fable III, there exist a race of antagonistic characters called "hollow men" which are featured throughout the game.
- A duo of animated skeleton brothers plays an important role in the role-playing game Undertale. Named Sans and Papyrus, the brothers' dialogue text is printed in Comic Sans and Papyrus fonts, respectively.
- Following a poll taken during their Kickstarter campaign, Larian Studios added a playable skeleton race in their 2017 RPG Divinity: Original Sin II, as well as an ancient skeletal character named Fane.
- The Mario series has some Koopa Troopa-skeleton themed enemies known as Dry Bones, where after they get hit, they return to their form. Bowser also has a skeleton form known as Dry Bowser, debuted in New Super Mario Bros., and featured in other games such as Mario Party and Mario Kart. This form also appeared in The Super Mario Galaxy Movie.
- The Legend of Zelda series features an enemy called Stalfos, armed skeletons who serve as regular enemies and occasionally as minibosses. Variations such as Stalkids and Stalblins also appear in various games in the series.
- In Heroes of Might and Magic 3, skeletons are recruitable troops from the Town Necropolis.
- The mobile games Clash of Clans and Clash Royale feature numerous types of skeletons as troops.
- Grim Fandango, set in the "Land of the Dead", includes a protagonist and love interest illustrated as living skeletons.
- The Golden Axe series commonly employs enemy skeletons wielding swords and shields, with strength levels conveyed by their varying color of bones.

== See also ==
- La Calavera Catrina
- Death (personification)
- Gashadokuro, a type of modern Japanese yokai which takes the form of a giant skeleton
- Hone-onna
- Lich
- Mummy
- Revenant
- Santa Muerte
- The Skeleton Dance
- Skull art
- Zombie
