= Alphys =

Character in Undertale and Deltarune

- Undertale and Deltarune character
- Alphys in Undertale
- First game: Undertale (2015)
- Last appearance: Deltarune (Chapter 5, 2026)
- Created by: Toby Fox
- Designed by: Toby Fox; Temmie Chang

In-universe information
- Gender: Female

Alphys (/ˈælfiz, ˈælfɪs/ ALF-eez, ALF-iss) is a character in the 2015 video game Undertale and the 2018 video game Deltarune. She is a bisexual reptilian monster who serves as the royal scientist under the leader of the Underground, Asgore, and is a fan of anime and manga. She is friends with Mettaton, a robot, and the captain of the Royal Guard, Undyne, who in the True Pacifist route becomes her girlfriend. She lives with social anxiety and depression, and the depiction of her struggles with these have been the subject of praise and commentary by critics. She watches the player-character throughout the game, offering guidance at some points, though with limited benefit. She is revealed to have dark secrets, including ones that relate to experimentation. She also appears in Deltarune as a school teacher.

Alphys was designed by Toby Fox and Temmie Chang. She was initially conceived as a male character, but Fox did not like this, so he made minor changes to her design and changed her gender. She has received generally positive reception, though some critics identified her as an annoying character. She has been identified as a positive representation of both neurodivergent and LGBTQ+ characters, with multiple critics identifying her as a relatable character. Alphys overcoming her issues was particularly cited as a strong example of Undertale's message of characters finding courage in themselves by Destructoid writer CJ Andriessen.

== Concept and creation ==
Alphys was created by Toby Fox for the video game Undertale, with collaboration from other artists, including Temmie Chang. She is a bisexual yellow lizard monster who typically wears a lab coat and glasses, working as a scientist. She is implied to have multiple mental illnesses. She is also a fan of anime and manga. Temmie created sprite art for her in Microsoft Paint, and Fox changed her eyes to make her cuter. An initial concept art based on the sprite was made by Temmie, though Fox felt it was too round and that she should be more "triangular". She has the most faces of any character in the game.

== Appearances ==
Alphys first appeared in the 2015 video game Undertale. She is the royal scientist working under the king of the Underground, Asgore, researching how to break through the barrier using human souls. She is also close friends with the captain of the Royal Guard, Undyne, having met her while hanging out in the garbage dump. When the human meets Alphys, she guides them through Hotland, though a robot she said she created, Mettaton, attacks the human at various points. She offers to help with puzzles over the upgraded phone she gives the human with limited results, though they also get social media updates from her. They discover from Mettaton that she created the puzzles to involve herself in the human's quest.

Her fate is dependent on the player's actions before the fight against Asgore. In a run where the player does not kill any monsters, Undyne will ask the human to deliver a love letter to her, leading to Alphys misunderstanding and going on a date with the human. Ultimately, she admits her feelings for Undyne, only for Undyne to show up and for them to talk out their feelings. Afterward, the player visits her True Lab, discovering experimentation she conducted on monsters who died to keep them alive by injecting them with "Determination" derived from six human souls, which leads to their bodies fusing together. She ultimately vows to return them to their families and come clean. When attempting the fight against Asgore again, it is interrupted by her and others, only for Flowey to take the monsters' souls, becoming Asriel Dreemurr. She appears in the fight against him, and must be saved by the human by reminding her of who she is. After the fight, she, along with other monsters, are able to escape through the now-destroyed Barrier. Alphys is seen in the credits being kissed by Undyne.

She later appears in Deltarune as a school teacher, with this depiction not being a continuation of her story in Undertale.

== Promotion and reception ==
Alphys has received multiple pieces of merchandise, multiple pieces produced by Fangamer. She was included in the second set of "Little Buddies" figures produced in collaboration with Fangamer. Fangamer also produced a keychain plush of Alphys, although it stopped being sold as of January 30, 2024. A soundtrack compiling music related to Mettaton and Alphys was also produced by Fangamer, as well as being featured in sets of stickers and pins.

Since appearing in Undertale, Alphys has received generally positive reception, though some critics found her annoying. Game Informer writer Daniel Tack and Mike Fatter were both critical of Alphys; Tack found Alphys annoying, while Fatter felt that Alphys was not well written and disrupted the game's flow. Kotaku writer Jason Schreier noted that he could not stand Alphys' "nerdery", stating that Undyne could do better than her, but the final boss fight helped him appreciate her somewhat. Designer and composer Laura Shigihara, while discussing her enjoyment of games making players feel like they are "part of its culture", noted Alphys and her social media updates as an example of this, saying that it made both her and the world of Undertale feel "very real".

Her music and themes have received coverage from critics. Writer Jason Yu discussed her leitmotif in the song "Alphys", calling it "one of the most straightforward themes" in Undertale while appreciating it for how well it represents Alphys. He discussed how it starts with a simple phrase before jumping into a higher key in the middle of the melody in the second. He felt this represented Alphys' "overeager personality". He then examined the song "Here We Are", discussing how her "happy melody has been transfigured and corrupted" into a scary melody, saying that it represents the True Lab well. Writer Andrés José Almirall Nieves also felt her theme was simple and represented Alphys well. They discussed how the "overeager left hand" caused it to "[rush] the tempo and [trip] over itself", creating "clumsy, half-step intervals on the first beat".

The portrayal of Alphys' mental illnesses and recovery from it have received discussion from writers. Pop Matters writer Nick Dinicola found Alphys' constant communication annoying, but appreciating that she was making an effort. He also discussed her self-hatred over being "painfully shy", believing that others hate her for it as well, and how that lead to her trying to show her confidence in ways that could prove harmful to others. He noted how her complexity makes it difficult for her issues to be solved through pacifism, running afoul of the message of Undertale. He felt that there should have been more conflict between Alphys and Undyne over Alphys' experimentation, since Undyne is someone who "takes her protectorship very seriously". Destructoid writer CJ Andriessen felt that Alphys represented Undertale's "message of courage" best of the whole cast, particularly the "courage to be herself" which resonated with him as someone who has been a "massive twine-ball of self-doubt for all of his life". Writer Eric Walsh discussed how Alphys represented a "negative depiction of unhealthy fandom", tying that to her lack of self worth.

Alphys has been well-received as both a queer woman and for her relationship with Undyne, with Nintendo Life writer Kate Gray describing her relationship as "absolutely wonderful". Eurogamer writer Natalie Flores related to Alphys the most out of the Undertale cast due to her also being "a socially anxious and shy woman who has a crippling fear of failure", also praising the scene where she confesses to Undyne as the best in the game. She discussed how the scene exemplified the "all too common shyness between queer women who are attracted to each other" and social anxiety. She felt that the scene was both "sweet and touching" and "silly" due to Undyne both praising Alphys and dunking her in the trash can, stating that "we deserve to grow to love who our real selves are". RPGFan writer Stephanie Sybydlo felt that the relationship between Alphys and Undyne was among the best of LGBTQ+ representation in RPGs, encouraging players to help "a lonely couple enjoy anime together". Comic Book Resources writer Rebekah Krum discussed their evolving dynamic, particularly Alphys believing herself unworthy of Undyne, and Undyne's fear of vulnerability, and how coming together helped them overcome these weaknesses.
