= Escaped Chasm =

2019 video game

- Itch.io game poster
- Developer: Temmie Chang
- Composer: Toby Fox
- Engine: RPG Maker MV
- Platforms: Windows; macOS
- Release: April 2, 2019
- Genre: Adventure
- Mode: Single-player

Escaped Chasm is a 2019 adventure game developed by American animator and illustrator Temmie Chang. As a test project, it was released on April 2, 2019, as freeware on Itch.io. The game is set in an abandoned house and follows an unnamed girl whose parents never come back.

Previously known for her illustration work on Toby Fox's Undertale (2015) and Deltarune Chapter 1 (2018), Chang used the game as a way to practice using the RPG Maker MV engine. Escaped Chasm received praise from reviewers. A first sequel, titled Dweller's Empty Path, was released in 2020, and a second sequel, titled Of The World, was released in 2026.

== Gameplay and plot ==
Escaped Chasm is an exploration-based adventure game with four different endings. The player controls an unnamed girl who lives alone in her parents' house. Without her parents, the player can freely explore the house and progress through the game by writing down events in a diary. Sleeping lets the player watch a dream sequence and continue to the next day. On the second day, the unnamed girl meets a man with a demonic appearance named Zera, who warns her that the house is slowly descending into chaos. As time progresses, the house gradually falls apart. Zera reveals that the girl's parents are gone and offers the opportunity to save them by taking the girl to another world. Despite knowing she will lose memories of her parents, the girl accepts Zera's offer.

== Development and release ==
Escaped Chasm was developed by illustrator and animator Temmie Chang, known for being the lead artist of Toby Fox's Undertale (2015) and the episodic title Deltarune, which as of 2019 only had its first chapter released. Escaped Chasm serves as a test project and Chang's first attempt at using the RPG Maker MV engine. Chang worked on art and animation while Fox composed the soundtrack for the game. Chang also had contributors help with additional music and sound design, with James Roach providing the supporting music. Her initial goal was to form a storyline and practice game development to create better projects in the future. Escaped Chasm was released on April 2, 2019, as freeware on Itch.io.

== Reception ==
Escaped Chasm was praised for its animation, visuals, music, and themes. Fraser Brown of PC Gamer called the game "brief but striking" and described the visuals as "lonely and occasionally unsettling". Rock Paper Shotgun's Dominic Tarason described it as heartfelt and liked the juxtaposition of red and blue color schemes in one of the game's cutscenes. Tarason said that it made the story feel "too real and oppressive" and contrasted it with the in-game pixel art. Reviewers commended Fox's music and compared the game to Undertale from its similar themes and dialogue.

== Sequel ==
On July 10, 2020, Chang released Dweller's Empty Path, an RPG Maker game that takes place within Escaped Chasm's universe; Fox and Japanese musician Camellia composed the soundtrack.
