= Demon Tides =

- Developer: Fabraz
- Publisher: Fabraz
- Platforms: Windows; Nintendo Switch
- Release: Windows; February 19, 2026; Nintendo Switch; TBA
- Genre: Platformer
- Mode: Single-player

Demon Tides is a 2026 3D platformer developed and published by Fabraz. It is a sequel to Demon Turf (2021). The game was released on February 19, 2026 for Windows. It is planned to be ported to Nintendo Switch.

== Gameplay ==
Demon Tides is a 3D platformer. Player controls Beebz, who can perform and platforming techniques like double jump and dashing attack. The game has an open world structure.

The player can leave a graffiti on the overworld, which is shared online.

== Development and release ==
Demon Tides was developed by Fabraz, the creator of Demon Turf and Slime-san. It was concurrently developed with Bubsy 4D. The game was announced in June 2024 with a tentatively title Project Tides. The official title was revealed in December 2024 with a gameplay trailer. A demo was released in February 2025 as part of Steam Next Fest.

Demon Tides was launched on February 19, 2026 for Windows via Steam. A Nintendo Switch version is planned. Fangamer will publish a physical edition of the Switch version bundled with Demon Turf.

== Reception ==
Reception

Aggregate scores
Aggregator	Score
Metacritic	84/100
OpenCritic	93% recommend

Review scores
Publication	Score
Hardcore Gamer	4.5/5
GamesRadar+	4/5
TheGamer	4.5/5
CGMagazine	8/10

Demon Tides received "generally favorable" reviews according to review aggregator Metacritic. 93% of the critics recommended the game according to OpenCritic.
