= Flowey =

Undertale character

- Undertale character
- 3D render of Flowey created for Fangamer
- First game: Undertale (2015)
- Created by: Toby Fox
- Designed by: Toby Fox; Everdraed

In-universe information
- Full name: Asriel Dreemurr
- Gender: Male

Flowey the Flower is a fictional character and the main antagonist of the 2015 video game Undertale, developed by Toby Fox. Flowey is the first NPC the player encounters in the game and introduces himself as a "friendly" and "helpful" talking flower, before quickly revealing himself to be a malevolent, megalomaniacal, and homicidal entity who abides by a "kill or be killed" philosophy.

Flowey is the final boss of Undertale's "Neutral" route; after absorbing the souls of the six fallen humans, he evolves into a grotesque form known as "Omega Flowey", alternatively known as "Photoshop Flowey". In the "True Pacifist" route, he additionally absorbs the souls of every monster in the Underground, and reveals that he is Asriel Dreemurr, the son of Toriel and Asgore, reincarnated as a soulless flower. In the "Genocide" route, he is killed by the protagonist after the final boss encounter with Sans.

Critics and fans have praised Flowey's characterization, backstory, occasional fourth wall breaking, and boss fights.

== Concept and creation ==
Flowey was conceived by Toby Fox, the creator of Undertale, with assistance from other artists like Chelsea Saunders. Flowey "appeared in [Fox's] head fully formed," and underwent little changes during development. Flowey's sprites were created by Fox, and they were the first created for the game. He took inspiration from multiple places, being partially inspired by a character named "Face" from a Godzilla: Monster of Monsters! creepypasta by artist CosbyDaf. Tasked with designing one of Steam's trading cards for Undertale, Saunders themself took inspiration from the Pokémon Trading Card Game, particularly art by Keiji Kinebuchi.

Graphic artist Everdraed became involved after the release of Undertale's demo in 2013, becoming a fan of the game and asked if he could work on it. Fox offered him the opportunity to design art for a Flowey boss fight. While Fox programmed the moving parts of the boss, Everdraed provided art for it. Everdraed used photoshopped images and baked animations and was tasked with making "unsettling" visuals. He wanted to do various things, such as have Flowey lose teeth over time that were reset after Flowey reset the save. He also wanted to animate "really crazy undulating vines," but scrapped this due to them being too distracting and too complicated for Fox's layering of assets behind them. He added bones, worms, and chains to his design, believing it reflected a "Big Bad Boss". Fox considered using certain other faces, but felt they were too funny to use. The screen on Flowey, which displayed various visuals, had some art assets planned by Everdraed, but due to potential content and licensing issues, they were scrapped. Bombs that Flowey produces were based on the two bombs used in the atomic bombings of Hiroshima and Nagasaki, with Everdraed hoping that it would not be taken as disrespect. He explained that his art involved "taking horrible, unpleasant footage and trying to put a 'happy face' on them." He wanted to accentuate the "inherently nasty nature against a backdrop of childlike whimsy," as though through the eyes of a child trying to understand it.

By the end of the game, the player discovers that Flowey is actually Asriel Dreemurr, the son of characters Toriel and Asgore, having been turned into a flower. The concept for an adult Asriel Dreemurr's boss battle was inspired by one of Toby Fox's programs where he would test visual effects; he created an image of Toriel with evil eyes, which urged him to implement it in the game because he thought it "looked cool". The boss fight was almost exclusively designed by Fox, though artist Temmie Chang contributed "sepia-tone intro-style images" to the battle. His final form was originally intended to take up the whole screen, with the logic being "that's what final bosses are supposed to do." He ended up designing an adult version of Asriel, with long horns, a tuft of hair, as well as him flying for the battle. This tuft of hair was added after a long time of development. He originally envisioned that the fight with Asriel would be against his child form, though this idea did not last for long. Fox briefly considered giving Asriel "boyband hair," but rejected it. He noted, however, that some fanart depicted him with such hair, which he appreciated that these artists understood this aspect of his character. Fox attempted to modify his horns to make them look "cooler," but he felt it made him look stupid, he had also made Asriel float during his battle as he felt Asriel's original standing pose made him look "like a doofus".

== Appearances ==
=== In Undertale ===
Asriel Dreemurr, as seen in one of the cutscenes of his boss fight in the True Pacifist route

Asriel Dreemurr, as seen in his "God of Hyperdeath" form during his boss fight

On most routes of the game, various monsters in the Dreemurrs' former household explain that Asriel befriended a human child who his parents adopted after they fell into the Underground. Asriel loved the child like a sibling, and when they died of an unspecified illness, he absorbed their soul in grief, granting him increased power and allowing him to breach the Underground's magic barrier. Asriel attempted to carry the child to a bed of flowers on the surface that they hoped to see before dying, but was attacked by humans who assumed that he had killed the child. Asriel chose to bear the assault rather than fight back and succumbed to his injuries upon returning home, disintegrating into dust.

Some time later, Asriel is unintentionally revived as Flowey, a sentient flower, by Alphys after she injects a flower containing remnants of Asriel's dust with "determination". Without a soul, Flowey no longer has the ability to love, as he finds out when he feels nothing when being reunited with his family. This initially prompted him to commit suicide, but instead of dying, he discovered his ability to "Save" and "Reset" time due to the "determination" he had been given.

Flowey first appears during the start of the game as an unassuming, sentient flower and engages in a battle with the player and seemingly helps them by awarding them with "friendliness pellets," which actually harm the player. Showing a more sadistic and psychopathic side, Flowey states his philosophy of "kill or be killed," then attempts to kill the player, but is driven away by Toriel. Flowey appears again after battling Toriel to judge the player if they spared or killed her. Covertly following the player throughout the game, Flowey appears again directly after battling Asgore and finishes him off in order to obtain and use the power of the human souls. In doing so, he takes on a gigantic, grotesque form, referred to as "Omega Flowey", which also allows him to destroy the player's save file and utilize save states. After being defeated, the player is given the option to kill or spare him; sparing Flowey causes him to reappear after the credits of every subsequent playthrough and give the player hints on how to achieve the game's "True Pacifist" ending.

If the player reaches Asgore on a subsequent playthrough without killing any monsters and after befriending certain characters, Flowey instead absorbs the human souls along with the souls of every monster in the Underground, which transforms him into an older and more powerful version of Asriel. After reaching out to the souls of the monsters Asriel absorbed, the player calls out to Asriel as well, causing him to regain his empathy and revert to his child form. He apologizes for his misdeeds and uses the power of the souls to destroy the barrier, then restores the monsters back to physical form before vanishing. Promotional material published after the game was released reveals that Asriel turned back into Flowey and remained in the Underground after the monsters left.

When the player reaches Asgore on the game's "Genocide Route" after killing a predetermined number of monsters, Flowey, who believes that the player is his former human sibling reincarnated, realizes that the player intends to kill him as well. He finishes off Asgore in an attempt to bargain for his life, but he is ultimately killed by the player.

=== In Deltarune ===
Asriel is reintroduced in Deltarune as Kris's adoptive older brother, who is currently away at college. Multiple residents of his hometown describe him in positive terms and anticipate his return. One of the main characters, Ralsei, also bears multiple similarities with him. In Chapter 5, a personified golden flower named "Flowery" appears in one of the game's magical Dark Worlds and serves as the chapter's antagonist, though his characterization is pointedly different from Flowey's nihilism, instead attempting to distract Asgore from his fixation on the past. As of Chapter 5, Asriel has not yet made a physical appearance in the game.

=== Other appearances ===
Flowey's head appears in Among Us as a cosmetic belonging to the "Indie Cosmicube"; there are two versions, the normal version and the "evil" version.

== Reception ==
Flowey has received generally positive reception. Flowey was a runner-up for USgamer's best characters of 2015, citing his knowledge of everything the player "has been up to", which may leave the player "a little stunned." USgamer also called the older Asriel "exactly the kind of thing a suffering pre-teen would design if they had possession of God's own wrath." Game Informer called Flowey one of the top 10 fourth wall breaking moments in games, calling him a "crazed talking flower". Zack Furniss of Destructoid stated that the battle against Flowey was one of his favorite gaming moments of 2015, saying that while he was apprehensive about playing the game, the fact that "a small flower ends up being a Photoshopped monster that can destroy in seconds", "sold" him on the game. Calling Photoshop Flowey "wonderfully disturbing", he called the boss and how it affected the player's save file what would stay with him the longest.

Critics have commented on Flowey's seeming ability to transcend the game world. Player vs. Monster compared Flowey to the boss Psycho Mantis from Metal Gear Solid due to their abilities to read the player's save file and mock them for their decisions. The author noted that Photoshop Flowey's colorful, realistic graphics were commissioned to be unsettling on purpose, contributing to the impression that Flowey is able to "break from containment". Horror Literature and Dark Fantasy similarly states that Flowey's edict of "it's kill or be killed" encourages the player to think critically about the initial systems set by the game, also framing it in terms of queer gaming practices that play against the intent of the game's design, repurposing and resisting the rules.

Japanese Role-Playing Games states that Flowey is an example of a parodic guiding character directly inspired by the Mother series. It also explains that Flowey demonstrates how tutorial characters can be both parodic and central to a game's narrative. Ludopolitics describes Flowey as a "rich, complicated antagonist", also characterizing him as an analogue for completionist players. Flowey is motivated by curiosity for its own sake, and believes he has the strength to see the game's "no mercy" route for himself, insulting those who would not play it but still watch it to see what happens.

Jason Schreier of Kotaku called the fight against Flowey's true form as Asriel "one of the greatest final boss fights in RPG history", saying that it rivaled "games like EarthBound and Chrono Trigger in sheer, gut-wrenching poignancy." Stating that he has "one hell of a theme song", he praised the entire fight sequence as "spectacular", saying that it "justifies even the slowest of Undertale's setups".
