= Asgore =

Character in Undertale and Deltarune

Asgore Dreemurr
- Undertale and Deltarune character
- Asgore in Undertale
- First game: Undertale (2015)
- Last appearance: Deltarune (Chapter 5, 2026)
- Created by: Toby Fox
- Designed by: Toby Fox; Temmie Chang

In-universe information
- Gender: Male

Asgore Dreemurr is the secondary antagonist in the 2015 video game Undertale developed by Toby Fox, and a character in Undertale's episodic follow-up Deltarune. The king of the Underground, he is a special type of creature known as a Boss Monster and serves as the penultimate boss of the neutral route. Having previously killed six other humans as part of a plan to break an ancient Barrier created to entrap the Underground's denizens, he intends to take the protagonist's soul as the seventh and final one, freeing the monsters from the Underground. He was created by Toby Fox, with support from artist Temmie Chang.

Asgore has been generally well received, praised for the execution of the battle between him and the human, particularly him preventing the human from sparing him by destroying the mercy button. The moral dilemma of killing humans to help the monsters, as well as the similarities between the musical themes of Asgore and his wife Toriel, have made him the subject of commentary.

== Concept and creation ==
Asgore was created for Undertale, designed by the game's creator, Toby Fox. Asgore was initially intended to be an intimidating character until Fox thought of his friend Reid Young, leading him to make Asgore "goofy." In early concept art by Temmie Chang, he was depicted without a beard. His colored sprite also used to have black hair, though Fox changed this to make it more readable. In 2025, Fox revealed that the intro melody of Asgore’s theme was heavily inspired by Shoji Meguro's Persona 4 song "The Fog". He also mentioned that the project file that contains the intro melody was titled "persona4.flp".

== Appearances ==
=== In Undertale ===
Asgore first appears in the game Undertale, serving as one of the game's antagonists. He and the monsters he ruled had been driven into the Underground, a cave beneath the fictional Mt. Ebott, millennia ago by hostile humans, and trapped there by a magical Barrier. Before the events of the game, he and his wife Toriel had two children: Asriel and an adopted human. The human, who had fallen into the Underground, has the name Chara, which when entered the game remarks as "The true name". Nonetheless, the human can be named differently by the player. Both Asriel and Chara were ultimately killed by humans following an ill-fated plan to cross the Barrier. Asgore, seeking revenge on humanity, began to reap the souls of humans who had fallen into the Underground, with the intention of using their power to destroy the Barrier. Unwilling to fully enact his plan, Asgore chose to wait and ambush them one by one rather than exit the Barrier with a single human soul and immediately claim six more. Toriel, angered by his hypocrisy, decided to live alone in the Ruins.

Asgore is unseen for most of the game, though other characters, such as Toriel, warn the protagonist about him. Other monsters are more positive about him, including Undyne, who he helped on her path to becoming the captain of the Royal Guard. She tells the human that when she once attacked him, she couldn't land a single hit, while Asgore was not even fighting back. Asgore also works with other characters, like Alphys, the Royal Scientist, who helps the human get to Asgore's throne room, though warning that Asgore and the human will inevitably have to fight one another.

When the human eventually meets Asgore, he is anxious to fight, doing so out of duty to the monsters rather than any personal desire to kill. During battle, he destroys the Mercy menu option on the user interface, preventing the human from sparing him and forcing them to fight to the death. Unlike other monster encounters, the player must fight him, though his health will not lower to zero upon defeat. At this point, Asgore accepts defeat, and the human can choose to either kill or spare him, having rebuilt the Mercy menu option. If spared, he will be moved, and decide to not break the Barrier, and instead become part of a family with the human, though he will accept death if killed. In the former option, the character Flowey, who had served as an antagonist in the beginning of the game, returns and kills Asgore instead before turning to fight the human.

After fighting Flowey, the player can either kill or spare Flowey as well. After the credits, Flowey instructs the player how to get the best ending. Once these conditions are fulfilled, either from reloading an earlier save or starting a new run, the human's encounter with Asgore will be interrupted by Toriel and other characters. Eventually, it is revealed that Flowey got these characters together, using their combined souls to reveal his true form, Asriel, who was resurrected as Flowey, lacking a soul, and becoming unable to feel empathy. During the fight, the human is able to rescue the souls of monsters Asriel took, including Asgore. After making Asriel stop fighting, he breaks the Barrier, allowing Asgore and the others to go outside of the Underground. In the "Genocide" route, a separate story path in which the protagonist sets out to kill all monsters in the Underground, the player is strong enough to immediately kill Asgore in one hit.

=== In Deltarune ===
Asgore, as he appears in the Light World (left) and Dark Worlds (right) in Deltarune

Asgore also appears as an NPC in Deltarune. This parallel universe, taking place in a more standard town environment, Asgore has still gotten a divorce from Toriel, while Asriel is still alive. He was formerly the town's chief of police, but had been fired or left for unknown reasons. He owns a flower shop named "Flower King", a reference to his role in Undertale. He is depicted as a loving and somewhat goofy father figure of Kris, Deltarune's protagonist.

In Chapter 4, Asgore attempts to make amends with Toriel after a church service, but is rejected. It is later revealed that he is also employed by Carol Holiday as a cleaner and that she is funding Asgore's flower shop. In hidden areas in the manor it is also shown that Asgore is plotting a way to clean his name and have Toriel take him back. It is also shown that he possesses a black shard which description matches to a shard of The Roaring Knight's black knife, potentially suggesting a connection between the two.

In Chapter 5, Asgore's flower shop is turned into a Dark World that becomes the main setting of the chapter, with him appearing as the king of this world in an attire similar to his appearance in Undertale. At the end of the chapter, it is revealed that Asgore has been burdened by guilt and self-hatred since his failure in preventing an unnamed tragedy in the town many years ago, an attitude that led to his divorce with Toriel, and he vowed to investigate the Dark World to prove that it wasn't his fault. As the protagonists seal Flower King's Dark Fountain, the Roaring Knight creates a second Dark Fountain and abruptly kidnaps Asgore before the protagonists could stop them.

== Reception ==
ASGORE
Asgore's theme received notable praise for its usage of a leitmotif from Toriel's boss theme.

Asgore has generally been well received by critics, particularly for the emotional conflict behind his actions and backstory. Former Destructoid editor Darren Nakamura considered him among the best new characters of 2015, feeling that despite the cast of Undertale being so solid, none of them were as "endearing, tragic, or adorable" as Asgore. He considered him the most "conflicted and multi-dimensional" character in the game. Nakamura discussed how the game frames him as an "unstoppable, terrifying force who will rip you limb from limb," the player discovers how good he actually is from the monsters. He commented that finding out how kind he is made it hurt to find out how damaged he was, which led him to commit "truly evil" acts. Author Andrés José Almirall Nieves discussed how the moments before encountering Asgore, where monsters discussed their dreams of escaping and their appreciation for Asgore's actions, helped engendered empathy for Asgore's side of the story, which he felt reinforced Undertale's message of "love and connection."

The fight with Asgore was praised alongside the fight with Sans by Kotaku writer Ash Parrish for subverting what players of the Pacifist route can do in the fight. They felt that it forced players to decide whether to kill a character for the first time. Writer Tobias Salte Klausen also discussed the game removing player agency in this fight, also discussing how the game removes player agency in the Genocide fight by forcing the human to kill Asgore. Author Matthew Perez noted that, in the Genocide route, Asgore does not recognize the human as a human, suggesting that the question of "what kind of monster are you?" is meant to be a "sarcastic jab" at the player for their choices.

Asgore's theme and connection to Toriel has been discussed by critics. Andrés José Almirall Nieves discussed how his theme, "Bergentrückung," takes its name from the German term for the "king in the mountain," which is a prominent figure in folklore. They also discussed how his theme reflected Toriel's theme, turning the ostinato figure "into a sturdy 4/4 meter instead of a lilting 6/8." Writer Jason Yu also discussed the shared thematic elements between Asgore and Toriel, including the gradual discovery of the relationship between them. He also observed the similar ostinato, appreciating that it did not come into the song immediately, as he felt it would have given away the musical relationship between Asgore and Toriel too easily. He also felt that the different time signatures helped exemplify the two songs' rhythmic differences. Writer Arthur Canzi Zeferino noted how Asgore and Toriel have similar attack patterns with their fire, discussing how Toriel eventually holds back to not kill the human, but Asgore is unyielding unless defeated. Matthew Perez felt that the reuse of Toriel's musical motif was meant to demonstrate the struggle Asgore experienced with his actions.
