= Deltarune =

Episodic video game

- Publishers: Toby Fox; 8-4 (Note: 8-4 ported and published the console versions.)
- Director: Toby Fox
- Producer: Robert Sephazon
- Designer: Toby Fox
- Artist: Temmie Chang
- Writer: Toby Fox
- Composer: Toby Fox
- Engine: GameMaker Studio 2
- Platforms: macOS; Windows; Nintendo Switch; PlayStation 4; PlayStation 5; Nintendo Switch 2
- Release: 2018 – present Chapter 1: macOS, Windows; October 31, 2018; Switch, PS4; February 28, 2019; PlayStation 5; June 4, 2025; Nintendo Switch 2; June 5, 2025; Chapter 2: macOS, Windows; September 17, 2021; Switch, PS4; September 23, 2021; PlayStation 5; June 4, 2025; Nintendo Switch 2; June 5, 2025; Chapters 3+4: macOS, Switch, PS4, PS5, Win; June 4, 2025; Nintendo Switch 2; June 5, 2025; Chapter 5: June 24, 2026; Chapter 6: 2027; Chapter 7: TBA
- Genre: Role-playing
- Mode: Single-player

Deltarune is an episodic role-playing video game created by American indie developer Toby Fox. Set in a parallel universe to his 2015 game Undertale, it follows Kris, a human teenager predetermined to save the world alongside Susie, a monster, and Ralsei, a prince from the Dark World. Throughout the story, the party establishes relationships with a variety of allies and opponents. The combat system is turn-based and uses bullet hell mechanics. Like in Undertale, enemy encounters can be resolved peacefully or through violence. The game shares several characters and gameplay elements with Undertale, but takes place in a separate setting and features an overhauled battle system with multiple party members.

The inspiration for Deltarune came to Fox in a fever dream in 2011. Development initially began in 2012, but was abandoned before Fox created the first room. Temmie Chang, who had assisted with character art in Undertale, serves as the main artist. After the release of the first chapter, Fox expanded the team to assist with development.

The first two chapters were released as free demos in 2018 and 2021, respectively, while the third and fourth chapters were made available in 2025 with the game's paid release. The fifth chapter was released as a free update in June 2026, with the sixth planned for 2027 and a seventh planned for a later release. Initially released for macOS and Windows, it was later ported to the Nintendo Switch and PlayStation 4 in 2019, followed by the Nintendo Switch 2 and PlayStation 5 in 2025. The game has been praised by critics for its soundtrack, characters, narrative, sense of humor, and LGBTQ+ representation.

== Gameplay ==
Kris, Susie, and Ralsei in a battle with two enemies

Deltarune is a role-playing video game with a top-down perspective. The player controls a human named Kris Dreemurr and has a party of other characters who they select actions for during battle. The game features both overworld and combat sections. In the overworld, the player can solve puzzles, collect items, and interact with characters and the environment. Different chapters introduce unique traversal mechanics, such as climbing, or statues that shift the game into a 2D platformer with action-based combat. Unlike Undertale, Deltarune does not have a random encounter system; instead, players can see the enemies in the environment before they encounter them, allowing for the possibility of avoiding or deliberately initiating combat.

The game uses a turn-based combat system, where players can choose from a set of actions each turn: fight, act, item, spare, and defend. As in Undertale, players control a heart-shaped soul in a fixed area and must dodge enemy attacks in the form of bullets, though the exact mechanics are sometimes unique to the respective enemy. Defending or "grazing" an incoming attack by letting it come close to the heart without getting hit by it increases the tension points (TP) gauge, which allows party members to use spells or special abilities. For example, Ralsei can pacify tired enemies with a spell.

Players may use acts and spells to spare enemies non-violently. The second chapter introduced the ability to use this strategy to recruit enemies to live in the player's Castle Town. Alternatively, fighting an enemy, which also increases TP, can lead to them being defeated violently. Starting in chapter 2, defeating enemies violently causes party members to gain HP and magic power after the battle ends, but enemies defeated this way cannot be recruited for the rest of the chapter.

== Plot ==
Deltarune's narrative spans seven chapters, of which five have been released. Although it features characters and elements from Undertale, it takes place in a parallel universe distinct from that game's setting. (Note: Critics and the game's lead developer have variously described Deltarune as a "parallel story" to Undertale, despite early reports suggesting it as a direct sequel.)

=== Chapter 1 – The Beginning ===
The game begins with a voice prompting the player to create an avatar, but the "vessel" is ultimately discarded, as "no one can choose who they are in this world." Instead, the player is given control of human teenager Kris Dreemurr, who arrives at school late. After being paired with their delinquent monster classmate Susie for a group project, their teacher Alphys sends them to get supplies. However, they fall into a strange realm within the supply closet, called a Dark World, where they meet the dark prince Ralsei. He welcomes them to his empty Castle Town and tells them of a prophecy, in which they are three heroes destined to seal the geyser-like Dark Fountains that sustain the Dark Worlds. A new Dark Fountain has created a Dark World next to Ralsei's, ruled by the tyrannical King, and threatens to upset the balance between the Light and Dark Worlds. An uninterested Susie joins King's son Lancer in opposing Kris and Ralsei, but both are eventually convinced to change sides and join the party.

Unwilling to confront his father or see his new friends hurt, Lancer betrays the party and imprisons them in King's dungeon. After freeing Kris and Ralsei, Susie fights Lancer, but reconciles with him and promises not to hurt King. The three confront and defeat King, who remains unrepentant even after being spared. After sealing the Fountain, Kris and Susie wake up in an unused classroom filled with objects resembling the Dark World's inhabitants. That night, after returning home, Kris rips out their soul (represented as a red heart and directly controlled by the player), locks it away, and draws a knife.

=== Chapter 2 – A Cyber's World ===
The next morning, Kris's mother Toriel scolds them for eating her pie with the knife. After sleeping through class, Kris and Susie return to Castle Town, where Ralsei instructs them to retrieve the objects from the unused classroom to restore their Darkner forms. He then sends them away to focus on their school project with classmates Noelle Holiday and Berdly. However, they discover a new Dark World within the library's computer lab ruled by a laptop Darkner named Queen, who has recruited Berdly to her side and kidnapped Noelle. After reuniting with Ralsei and Noelle, the party splits up, and Kris and Noelle rekindle their childhood friendship while evading Queen and Berdly.

Queen betrays Berdly and captures everyone, but Kris and Susie escape and convince him to join the party. They confront Queen, who reveals that the Dark Fountains were created by a mysterious figure known as the Roaring Knight; she intends to force Noelle to open another Fountain for her, something any Lightner can do. She attacks the party with a giant mech, but they eventually convince her to stand down. Berdly attempts to create a Fountain for Noelle, but Ralsei warns everyone that opening too many Fountains will cause the prophecy's apocalyptic Roaring.

After Kris seals the Fountain, the four awaken in the computer lab, and Noelle and Berdly dismiss the adventure as a dream. Kris heads home, and Toriel invites Susie to spend the night. While Susie and Toriel are occupied, Kris rips their soul out of their chest, locks it in the bathroom, and briefly leaves. After they return, Toriel finds her car tires have been slashed and calls the police. Once everyone falls asleep, Kris removes the soul again and creates a Dark Fountain in the living room.

=== Chapter 3 – Late Night ===
Kris and Susie awaken in the new Dark World, where Ralsei attempts to dissuade them from becoming too attached to him or other Darkners, since they are all unreal alternate manifestations of everyday objects. As Susie attempts to convince him of his worth, they are interrupted by Tenna, a Darkner created from Toriel's old television. The party agrees to star in his game shows, but they eventually sneak off the set and find a sleeping Toriel held hostage. Despite their protests, Tenna refuses to stop the games and allow them passage to the Fountain. Feeling abandoned and obsolete after the Dreemurr and Holiday families drifted apart, he explains that the Roaring Knight promised him relevance in exchange for keeping the Fountain open. After the party defeats Tenna, Ralsei and Susie comfort him, promising to help him find love and appreciation in another household.

Touched, Tenna agrees to return Toriel and let them seal the Fountain, but he is suddenly attacked by the Knight. The Knight defeats the party and attempts to capture Toriel, but is foiled by police officer Undyne, who had entered the Dark World responding to Toriel's previous call. After the Knight abducts Undyne, Kris and Susie pursue them across the Light World to Hometown's old emergency shelter, which houses another Dark World. The door shuts before they can enter, and they discover the bunker's lock requires three numeric codes. After resolving to find the shelter codes and save Undyne, Susie returns to the Dreemurr home, and the bunker door opens for Kris.

=== Chapter 4 – Prophecy ===
Kris and Susie go to church with Toriel the next morning after sealing the living room Fountain, and conclude that their best lead on the bunker codes is Noelle's mother, Mayor Carol Holiday. While investigating Holiday Manor, Susie distracts Noelle as Kris finds a code inside the guitar of Noelle's missing older sister December. However, they rip out their soul before it can be read. The player-controlled soul enters the ventilation system and overhears Kris calling an unknown person, who instructs them to prevent Susie from finding the guitar. Kris fails to stop Susie and Noelle from playing the guitar and takes back the soul, but Carol returns home and expels Susie before she can discover the code.

Kris and Susie return to the church and find it transformed into a Dark World depicting the prophecy. They encounter a Darkner patterned after the deceased Lightner Gerson Boom, who encourages the party to defy their foretold fates. Ralsei ultimately breaks down and admits he has been hiding the true prophecy from Kris and Susie, including its tragic ending.

After adventuring across three Dark Worlds within the church, the party confronts the Knight, who opens another Fountain and creates a Titan, a monstrous harbinger of the Roaring. They defeat the Titan with Gerson's help, and, to Ralsei's horror, Susie accidentally sees the prophecy's ending. She smashes the image before the player can see, dismissing it as something the party would never let happen. They seal the Fountain and return home to find Toriel partying with the grocery store janitor Sans. An uncomfortable Susie leaves, and Kris later receives another phone call. As they climb out the window, the unknown caller reminds them of a mysterious promise.

=== Chapter 5 – Festival Day ===
The next morning, Kris returns home to put the soul back in their body and finds the Castle Town Darkners preparing Susie for a date with Noelle at Hometown's Festival. After spending the day together, the two share a tender moment on the lakeshore, but Noelle leaves upon hearing that her father, Rudy, fell down while working on the lights. With Susie distracted, Kris removes the soul to create a Fountain inside their father Asgore's flower store.

Asgore is taken in by Flowery, a human-like "Plant" character (Note: In-game, plants are revealed as being neither Lightners nor Darkners at the end of Chapter 5.) formed from a preserved golden flower in his shop. While attempting to rescue him, the party encounters and befriends six more flower Plants who act as Asgore's servants in thanks for keeping them alive in the Light World. However, Asgore rejects the party's attempts to save him and instead obsesses over the truth behind the Fountains and the Knight, to the flowers' dismay.

After the party defeats the flowers, Asgore apologizes for his behavior, alluding to a previous tragedy in Hometown connected to the Dark Worlds that he felt responsible for. Kris seals the Fountain, but everyone is shocked as a second Fountain suddenly opens. The Knight appears, abducts Asgore, and escapes after wounding Flowery, who warns the party of a darkness growing beneath the town. In the Light World, Kris discovers another shelter code hidden inside the golden flower's pot, but Susie takes the code before Kris can destroy it. Kris accompanies Susie back to the school supply closet, where she resolves to tell Noelle about the Dark Worlds the next day. As she and the Darkners begin preparing Castle Town for Noelle's arrival, Kris silently leaves.

=== Alternate route ===
During Chapter 2, players can initiate an alternate route (commonly referred to as the "Snowgrave" route, the "Weird" route, or "Side B") by backtracking and forcing Noelle to freeze every enemy encountered. Spamton, a spambot normally encountered in an optional sidequest that leads to his secret boss fight, sells the player a powerful Thorn Ring item for Noelle to equip. Subsequently, during a battle with Berdly, the player orders Noelle to use a new spell, Snowgrave, to freeze him whole. With Noelle too exhausted to participate in Queen's plans, Ralsei informs her of the Roaring preemptively and prevents her battle. Spamton, who has taken over much of Queen's mansion, attempts to stop Kris before being frozen by Noelle. After sealing the Fountain, Berdly is found unresponsive in the Light World, leading Noelle to question if the events in the Dark World were real. Chapter 2 otherwise ends the same as the normal route, with Kris opening a Fountain in the living room.

Chapter 3 proceeds mostly as normal with only minor dialogue changes. However, in Chapter 4, Noelle asks Kris in Holiday Manor if they can talk privately after Kris removes their soul. Entering the ventilation system, the soul overhears a conversation between Kris and Noelle, in which it is revealed that Kris took Berdly to the hospital and visited Noelle the previous night. During their visit, Kris claimed the Dark World was just a dream and removed a thorn – the Thorn Ring's form in the Light World – from her hand. The soul enters the room, takes control of Kris, and directly communicates with Noelle before forcing the thorn back into her. Afterward, a furious Kris throws the soul in a trash can and beats it up before Carol orders everyone to leave. The chapter continues mostly unchanged until the end, when Carol calls Kris and tells them that Noelle is looking forward to seeing them at the Festival.

In Chapter 5, Kris tries to avoid the Festival by sleeping through the day. After the player forces them to get out of bed and explore the empty town with Susie, they meet Noelle at the lake. Convinced that Kris can free her from her mundane life, Noelle begs them to take control of her and make her do something "crazy" and "impossible". The two hold hands and walk into the lake until they are submerged. The screen fades to white, then cuts to black; the text "Insert Chapter 7 Side B" appears before the player is booted back to the game's chapter select screen, unable to continue playing. If the player aborts the route at this point, the game reverts to Noelle's normal route scene with Susie. Aside from Noelle criticizing herself for failing to break character, the rest of the chapter remains mostly unchanged.

== Development ==
Developer Toby Fox in 2017

The idea for Deltarune came to Toby Fox in a fever dream he had in 2011 in college. In the dream, he saw the ending of a video game and was determined to create it. Fox was also inspired by a collection of playing card designs posted on Tumblr by artist Kanotynes. Development of the game started in 2012 but was abandoned before Fox could create the first room. Some music from this initial attempt was recycled for Undertale, most notably the main battle theme (which became "Bonetrousle") and a piece called "Joker Battle" (which was reused as "Heartache").

During the Kickstarter campaign of Undertale in 2013, Fox decided that if he were to finish making Undertale, he would revisit Deltarune by combining the original concept of the game and Undertale. The game's title is an anagram of Undertale. Various factors, such as the improved graphics, an overhauled combat system, and Fox's new commitments from Undertale's success, made Deltarune a more challenging game to produce. Following the release of Chapter 4, he compared the scope of each chapter to a full game, describing the first four chapters as the equivalent of "two and a half Undertales". During the development of each individual chapter of the game, whenever Fox needed to explain the plot of a chapter to the game's team, Fox would instead make a "live radio drama" by himself for the team to watch and even prompt them to make choices during the story.

Deltarune is being developed in GameMaker Studio 2. The game introduces a new battle system comparable to the one used in the Final Fantasy franchise, contrasting with Undertale's combat system (which shared similarities with that of the Mother and Touhou Project series).

=== Art, character design, and writing ===
Temmie Chang, who had previously assisted Fox with character art in Undertale, serves as the main artist for Deltarune. Fox came up with Susie's design after playing Phoenix Wright: Ace Attorney. He originally based her on Maya Fey, and she would act "nice and cute". However, as her creation progressed, she eventually turned into more of a "thug". Ralsei's name was derived from Ralse, a character from an uncompleted RPG Maker game that Fox's oldest brother made when he was a child.

For the creation of one of the minibosses in Chapter 2, Fox asked artist Nelnal to design a "musical enemy", which later became Sweet Cap'n Cakes. Initially, the artist ended up designing three characters. However, Fox could not decide on a design, so he included the three characters in a single battle against three enemies as opposed to having separate battles for each character. Fox was unsure if anyone apart from himself would like Spamton, as some of the test players thought he looked scary and disliked his design. Despite this, Spamton became popular with players, with merchandise featuring the character selling out instantly.

Initially, Fox intended to create a 3D model for Tenna himself, and in 2016 he purchased a Kinect to rotoscope the character's animation, which was conceived by incorporating MikuMikuDance moves. He planned for Tenna to be rendered in "lineless 3D" style inspired by Ghost Trick: Phantom Detective, but this got scrapped as he thought it looked "tremendously bad". The model was eventually created by Chelsea Saunders, who previously worked on promotional material for Undertale, with assistance from Fox and a number of other collaborators, including SmallBü. Similar to Spamton, Fox thought that players did not care for Tenna and feared they would see him as a "budget Spamton". Nonetheless, he has affirmed that he is glad players enjoyed his character. One of Flowery's catchphrases and voice lines of him saying "Jarona" originates from Fox's older brother shouting Jarona while mimicking anime-style attacks when pretending to attack Fox when the two were kids.

=== Music ===
The game's soundtrack was primarily composed by Toby Fox, who served as the main composer for its music. Along with new leitmotifs for Deltarune, it also incorporates leitmotifs from the Undertale soundtrack. The soundtrack mainly comprises multiple soundtrack albums released alongside each respective chapter of the game; these feature guest appearances by Laura Shigihara, Lena Raine, Marcy Nabors, Alex Rosetti, Itoki Hana, insaneintherainmusic, Rakuichi, Camellia and Trevor Alan Gomes. Each album is published under Materia Collective.

== Release ==
=== Initial announcement and release ===
After previously teasing something Undertale-related a day earlier, Fox released the first chapter of Deltarune for free on October 31, 2018. Initially disguised as a "survey program", it was then described as a game "intended for people who have completed Undertale". Originally, all of the remaining chapters were intended to be released after the completion of the entire game. As he envisioned a larger project than Undertale, he stated that he needed to form a team, claiming it would be impossible to finish the game alone. The first chapter was later released for free on Nintendo Switch and PlayStation 4 on February 28, 2019, after being announced at a Nintendo Direct earlier that month. The console versions were developed and published by 8-4.

Development of the second chapter began in May 2020. Alongside shaping and refining the game's overarching narrative and character development, Fox spent most of his time experimenting with game engines other than GameMaker Studio 2. He eventually concluded that GameMaker "still felt like the best fit for the project", and using the first chapter as a base, he began working in May 2020, with Fox and Chang joined by a few other team members. At the time, Fox stated that Chapter 2 would be the game's largest, due to it having the most cutscenes and its usage of a large number of characters, among other factors.

During a livestream celebrating the sixth anniversary of Undertale in September 2021, Fox announced that the second chapter would be released for free on Windows and macOS two days later, on September 17. In his blog, he said that this price point was since the COVID-19 pandemic made the world "really tough for everybody recently".The Switch and PS4 versions were updated to include Chapter 2 on September 23, in conjunction with that day's Nintendo Direct.

=== Paid release and further content ===
Deltarune's menu indicates a total of seven chapters. Initially, the third, fourth, and fifth chapters were intended to be released as a single paid title once completed, and by 2022, work on these chapters was being undertaken simultaneously. In September 2023, a fully playable version of the third chapter was completed. Due to the ongoing length of development, Fox announced the following month that the initial paid release would only include the third and fourth chapters. He recruited Robert Sephazon as a producer in the beginning of 2024, and his team set an internal deadline of September 1 for the completion of Chapter 4's main content, which was met. The additional capacity afforded by Sephazon allowed Fox to add more members to the team. Owing to his wrist issues, Fox used speech-to-text software to input text into his computer, relying on other team members to do the programming.

Later in 2024, Fox stated that the next two chapters were undergoing localization and being ported to consoles, and would be released the following year. He also stated that the fifth chapter had begun production. As development continued, a third round from Tenna's game show in Chapter 3 was cut to improve the pacing of the game. During a Nintendo Direct presentation in April 2025, a paid version of Deltarune was announced for release on June 5 as a launch title for the Nintendo Switch 2. A version for the PS4, Switch, PS5, and Windows was released earlier on June 4. On its release, it contained the first four chapters, with future content intended as free updates.

The credits of the fourth chapter stated that Chapter 5 would be released in 2026. On the tenth anniversary of Undertale in September 2025, Fox stated that work had also started on bullet patterns for Chapter 6. By December 2025, localization had begun for Chapter 5, with Fox stating that work was going "excellently". During a Nintendo Direct in June 2026, it was announced that it would release on the 24th of that month. After the release of Chapter 5, Fox said he intends to release Chapter 6 in 2027, with work on Chapter 7 possibly beginning before the end of 2026; he has also stated that Chapters 6 and 7 would be released separately.

== Reception ==
The first chapter of Deltarune garnered many comparisons to Undertale. Jason Schreier of Kotaku called it similarly "charming, funny, and impactful", and Dominic Tarason of Rock Paper Shotgun compared it to "a higher-budget production". Although Mitchell Parton of Nintendo World Report thought that the chapter did not "significantly change up the formula", he did not have a problem with it, praising the "captivating" story and "unique" gameplay. Nintendo Life's Mitch Vogel was less positive, feeling that despite "solid" gameplay and story content, it failed to innovate from Undertale, resulting in "uninspired sameness".

Reception
Initial paid release (2025)

Aggregate score
Aggregator	Score
OpenCritic	100% recommend

Review scores
Publication	Score
GamesRadar+	4.5/5
IGN	9/10
Nintendo Life	8.5/10
TechRadar	4.5/5
Checkpoint Gaming	7.5/10

The initial version of the paid release, containing Chapters 1–4, also received positive reception, with 100% of reviewers recommending it on OpenCritic. Brendan Graeber of IGN described Deltarune as "something incredible" that he was "not likely to forget", and Ana Diaz called it a "phenomenal expression of [Fox's] signature idiosyncratic style" in her review for PCGamer. Errielle Sudario of Checkpoint Gaming stated that the additional chapters were "worth the wait" and contained "humour and heart" and more "polish, challenges, and questions". Mitch Vogel, writing again for Nintendo Life, thought that the game alleviated his previous criticism by establishing a "distinct identity" which made it a "worthy follow up to Undertale", but viewed its unfinished nature as leaving a "lingering feeling of dissatisfaction".

Shaun Cichaki, writing for Vice, described the combat design as more "refined and elegant" than that of Undertale, and Alan Wen of GamesRadar+ saw a "delightful" variation and creativity in the design of the game's encounters. Sudario said some of the later-game combat took "some time to master", but with a "payoff [that] is worth it". Conversely, TechRadar reviewer Vic Hood criticized some attacks for being "near impossible" to avoid on the Nintendo Switch 2, as opposed to the accuracy of a keyboard. RPGFan writer Aleks Franiczek described the platforming mechanics introduced in Chapter 5 as "jaw-dropping", comparing them to Hollow Knight.

Multiple reviewers praised the art direction, with Hood calling it "stunning", and Wen regarding the pixel art as "crude but charming" but also possessing "richer use of sprites, color and animations" compared to Undertale. Stating that the game benefited from Fox also being the primary composer, Graeber claimed it had an "embarrassment of phenomenal music", which New York Times writer Harold Goldberg described as being "remarkably diverse". Vogel said the "deep and varied" soundtrack demonstrated Fox was a "master of creating atmosphere". While she praised the overall art direction, Sudario criticized some parts of Chapter 4 for being too dark to navigate, and Vogel described the game's visuals as "middling" and "a tad underwhelming", though he noted that the style worked well with the game's humor.

The game's plot and writing was also praised by reviewers; Sudario said the later chapters "expand meaningfully and emotionally" on the plot of the earlier game. Hood stated that the game's characters began to feel like "real friends", stating that this was a "feeling I've not had with a game before", and Wen praised them for being uniquely "memorable, goofy and flawed". Multiple reviewers praised the game's comedy, with Cichaki commending its "slapstick humor immediately pivoting into existential dread". Graeber described the plot as having hidden "intrigue, beauty, and unpredictability", saying it raised "unsettling questions" about the connection between the player and the character they control. Alisandra Reyes of Game8 also praised the "deeper and more emotionally resonant" nature of the story, though she criticized the "meandering" nature and pace of Chapter 3, perceiving it as a "detour" rather than a progression of the story. After the release of Chapter 5, Rebekah Valentine of Kotaku praised its focus on "relationships played out in quiet moments" as opposed to narrative progression, which Graeber felt was a "very necessary piece of the puzzle"; opposingly, Vogel perceived the chapter as failing to sufficiently "further the overall storyline".

=== Awards ===
The game's soundtrack was nominated for the Game Audio Network Guild / MAGFest People's Choice Award at the 2019 G.A.N.G. Awards. At the 2025 Golden Joystick Awards, the game was nominated for Best Indie Game – Self Published and Best Soundtrack. It was awarded "Best Game" in the 2025 GameMaker Awards.

=== Player count and revenue ===
After the release of Deltarune's demo containing Chapters 1 and 2, it attracted around 100,000 concurrent players on Steam, far higher than Undertale's lifetime record. Deltarune was also one of the highest-grossing games on Steam in terms of revenue upon the initial release of Chapters 3 and 4. The game was also the best-selling digital game on Switch 2 upon the console's launch, outperforming both Nintendo Switch 2 Welcome Tour and Mario Kart World. Chapter 5 attracted over 290,000 concurrent players on Steam upon its release, breaking the previous record of 133,000.
