= List of Undertale and Deltarune characters =

Characters in Toby Fox's games

The ending of Undertale's "true pacifist" route. Left to right: Toriel, Sans, Papyrus, Frisk, Undyne, Alphys, and Asgore.

The main route of Deltarune Chapter 2. Left to right: Susie, Kris, Ralsei, Berdly, Queen, and Noelle.

Undertale and Deltarune are fantasy role-playing video games developed by Toby Fox. They take place in different fictional universes, but feature many of the same characters. Undertale is set in a world where monsters once coexisted with humans on the planet's surface, but, after an ancient war, were trapped in the Underground and forgotten. The game follows Frisk, a human child who falls into the Underground via an opening adjacent to Mount Ebott, and seeks to escape.

In Deltarune, considered a spiritual successor to Undertale, humans and monsters still coexist. Set in Hometown, the game follows Kris, who discovers a Dark World, an alternate view of reality inhabited by Darkners, living representations of real-world objects. They embark on a quest to close the Dark Fountains giving these Worlds form before darkness overtakes the real world.

The following is a list of major characters who appear in one or both games in the series. The characters have been praised by critics and fans for their humor and in-depth characterization shown through different moral choices. Some characters gained notoriety for their ability to break the fourth wall, manipulating gameplay elements normally only accessible to the player, such as saving.

== Creation and conception ==
Toby Fox in 2017

Toby Fox is the lead designer, writer, and primary composer for Undertale and Deltarune, while Temmie Chang and other guest designers design the characters. For Undertale, Fox felt it was important to make each of the game's monsters "feel like an individual". He cited the Final Fantasy series as the opposite; "all monsters in RPGs like Final Fantasy are the same ... there's no meaning to that".

== Undertale and Deltarune ==
=== Toriel and Asgore Dreemurr ===
Toriel, a powerful goat-like woman (belonging to a race known as the "Boss Monsters") living in the Ruins, is among the first characters met by the protagonist. She is the former queen of the Underground, where monsters live. Her ex-husband is its king, Asgore, with whom she had a child, Asriel, and adoptively raised a human child, Chara.

After Chara's untimely death, Asriel wielded their soul to cross the barrier and return their body to the surface, but was killed by humans in the process. Enraged, Asgore determined to collect human souls over time from those entering the Underground, until he would have enough to free monsterkind and take revenge on humanity. Toriel, sickened by her husband's obsession and cowardice, departed to live in seclusion among the Ruins below Mount Ebott. She takes the protagonist in after they fall into the Underground, and she attempts to keep them from leaving due to the worry that her ex-husband would hurt them; she is either killed or persuaded to let the protagonist leave.

Asgore awaits the protagonist at the end of their journey, where they are forced to battle. Asgore only survives in the game's "True Pacifist" route; otherwise, he is killed by either the protagonist or Flowey.

As Boss Monsters, once Toriel and Asgore have children, they only grow alongside their children, and cease to grow if their progeny disappears or dies.

In Deltarune, Toriel and Asgore are also separated. They are the parents of Asriel and the adoptive parents of the main protagonist, Kris. Kris lives with Toriel, a teacher, while Asgore, formerly Hometown's chief of police, lives apart from them at his "Flower King" flower shop. After an as-yet unspecified incident involving a Dark World, Asgore was fired from the police and became obsessed with collecting evidence to clear his name, straining his relationships. Mysteriously, the Knight attempts to kidnap Toriel and Asgore, failing to take the former in her sleep in Chapter 3, but succeeding with the latter in Chapter 5.

=== Asriel Dreemurr ===
In Undertale, Asriel is the deceased son of Toriel and Asgore, and the former prince of the Underground. Chara, his adoptive human sibling, convinced him to participate in a plot to collect six human souls from the surface, starting by them killing themself. After absorbing Chara's soul and leaving the Underground, Asriel refused to fight back against the humans who mistook him for Chara's murderer and was killed by them. Asriel was later reincarnated as Flowey by Alphys, but without a soul, he lacks empathy and compassion in this form. In the game's "True Pacifist" route, Flowey transforms into an adult representation of Asriel, known as the "God of Hyperdeath," serving as the final boss of the route. After being defeated, Flowey temporarily reverts to the child form of Asriel and regains his empathy, long enough to share a tender moment with the protagonist and break the Underground's barrier.

Jason Schreier of Kotaku called Asriel's final boss fight one of the greatest in video game history, citing its climactic music and the necessity to save your friends from him. Describing the sequence as "spectacular", he stated that, "if you're not already bawling as you mash the SAVE button over and over again during the final part of this fight, well... you will".

In Deltarune, Asriel is Kris's adoptive older brother who has left for college. He has not yet made a physical appearance in the game, but has been referenced numerous times with characters anticipating his return to Hometown.

=== Sans and Papyrus ===
A pair of skeleton brothers known for their outlandish human-capturing schemes, Sans and Papyrus primarily function as comic relief within Undertale. They are respectively named after the typefaces Comic Sans and Papyrus, which they use in their dialogue, with Papyrus speaking in all-uppercase, and Sans mostly speaking in all-lowercase.

Papyrus is egotistical yet incompetent, though Undyne claims he is "pretty freaking tough." He has a fondness for puzzles, and is desperately lonely, wishing to capture a human to join the Royal Guard and improve his "friend quantity". Despite this, he is shown to be a kindhearted and genial character who believes that anyone can be good if they try.

Sans is a clever, laid-back slacker and trickster. He often pulls practical jokes and enjoys making puns, and he bonds with Toriel over their shared love of the latter. Sans also frequently breaks the fourth wall, occasionally alluding to an understanding of the world's manipulation by the player via save files. At the end of Undertale, before the protagonist faces Asgore, Sans "judges" the player's morality, and in the "Genocide" route, he acts as the final boss himself, where he manipulates some of the game's mechanics against the player.

In Deltarune, Sans runs a grocery store in Hometown known as 'Sans, and is shown developing a close friendship with Toriel. Sans additionally mentions that he has a brother, whom he expresses a desire for Kris to meet. This is implied to be Papyrus, but his whereabouts are not revealed as of Chapter 5.

=== Undyne ===
In Undertale, Undyne is the powerful leader of Asgore's Royal Guard. She is humanoid with fish-like features. While initially presented as intimidating, her clumsy behavior in combat is heavily inspired by anime, which Alphys has convinced her is an accurate representation of the human world. She possesses a small amount of Determination: a substance that makes humans far stronger than monsters and enables her to persist upon death. Compared to Asgore, who harbors remorse for killing others, Undyne holds a deep hatred for humans and will not hesitate to kill them, although this lessens if the protagonist befriends her.

In Deltarune, she serves as Hometown's chief of police after Asgore was fired. She lacks an eyepatch over her right eye from Undertale and only knows Alphys in passing. In Chapter 3, Undyne enters the Dark World of the Dreemurr household just in time to rescue the party and Toriel from the Roaring Knight. However, she is quickly snatched away by the Knight and brought to the locked shelter south of Hometown, with Susie resolving to break in and rescue her.

=== Alphys ===
In Undertale, Alphys is Asgore's Royal Scientist and Undyne's love interest. She is a shy, nerdy, lizard-like monster with low self-esteem, and is a heavy otaku. She created Mettaton's robot body in order to make Asgore think she was capable of creating artificial souls to gain the position of Royal Scientist. She and Mettaton manufacture problems for her to solve for the protagonist and gain their trust, though Mettaton later rebels and attacks the protagonist outright. Alphys succeeded W.D. Gaster as Royal Scientist after his mysterious disappearance.

Undertale's "True Pacifist" route reveals that she experimented with Determination on comatose monsters, but this caused them to melt and fuse with each other into creatures known as "Amalgamates"; she keeps them locked away in a hidden "True Lab". The same series of experiments resulted in the creation of Flowey, after Alphys injected Determination into a flower that had Asriel's dust on it.

In Deltarune, she is a teacher at Kris's school and is also infatuated with Undyne, but from afar.

=== Napstablook ===
Napstablook is a shy, apologetic, and insecure ghost with an interest in music production, who lives alongside the monsters in both Undertale and Deltarune. Their dialogue is written using exclusively lowercase letters, along with frequent and lengthy ellipses.

In Undertale, Napstablook first appears in the Ruins as the game's first miniboss encounter, then reappears in Waterfall to interrupt the battle against Mad Dummy. They can be found from then on at their nearby home, where they own and operate the Blook Family Snail Farm. There, the player can participate in a snail-racing minigame run by Napstablook called "Thundersnail". Hidden diaries belonging to Mettaton refer to Napstablook as his "cousin", and reveal that they were close friends before Mettaton became famous. If Mettaton is defeated through non-violent means during his boss fight, a phone call from Napstablook inspires Mettaton to remain in the Underground instead of escaping.

In Deltarune, Napstablook works as a police officer for Hometown's police force alongside Undyne, and participates in the town's annual Festival during Chapter 5.

=== Gerson Boom ===
In Undertale, Gerson is an elderly shopkeeper in Waterfall. He was once a hero known as the "Hammer of Justice" and fought in the war against humans. He was at one point a mentor of Undyne's. Optional dialogue during the game's "Genocide" route indicates that Gerson has some awareness of his existence as a video game character, as he knows he cannot be attacked while he is within his shop.

In Deltarune, Gerson was a local historian and fantasy author who died before the start of the game. In Chapter 4, a Darkner greatly resembling Gerson, simply referred to as the Old Man, appears in a Dark World as the personification of an item from Gerson's burial ritual that was exhumed from his grave. The Old Man operates a small shop and spends most his time writing a letter of encouragement to Gerson's son, the local priest, which he later gives to Susie to rewrite in the Light World. He also encourages and mentors Susie, helping her improve her healing magic and adopting the "Hammer of Justice" persona to duel with her as the chapter's secret boss. (Note: In the context of Deltarune, secret bosses are bosses that drop a Shadow Crystal upon being defeated.) At the end of the chapter, the Old Man reappears to help the party defeat a Titan.

=== Mad Mew Mew ===
Mad Mew Mew is the name given to a recurring ghost character who appears in both Undertale and Deltarune. Like other ghosts in the setting, she is an incorporeal being who seeks to attain a physical form by possessing an ideal object. Mad Mew Mew has an egocentric and short-tempered personality, and a speech quirk of repeating the same word or phrase three times in a row with increasing emphasis. She is cousins with Mettaton and Napstablook.

In Undertale, the ghost first appears as "Mad Dummy", a possessed training dummy in Waterfall who serves as a miniboss. The ghost is referred to using gender-neutral language in this encounter. In the Nintendo Switch version of the game, the ghost reappears later as an optional encounter, having fully bonded with a life-sized doll of an anime catgirl named "Mew Mew Kissy Cutie" and subsequently adopting her persona as "Mad Mew Mew". This doll form has since appeared in other promotional material for Undertale as a prominent character. Mad Mew Mew's search for an ideal body and eventual adoption of a feminine identity has been interpreted as a transgender allegory.

In Deltarune, an unseen ghost with Mad Mew Mew's signature speech quirk lives in Hometown. In Chapter 5, the ghost jealously covets a Mew Mew Kissy Cutie figurine belonging to Asgore, then possesses it just before his flower shop is turned into a Dark World. The subsequent Darkner created from the possessed figurine is named Pink, and she serves as Chapter 5's secret boss. Although Pink is not one of the Seven Colored Flowers, Orange refers to Pink as her big sister. During the fight, the Darkner made from the figurine body and the Lightner ghost possessing it come into conflict over the shared control of their body, before ultimately agreeing to respect each other's autonomy.

== Exclusive to Undertale ==
=== Frisk ===
Frisk is a child from the surface and the main playable character of Undertale who searches for a means to escape the Underground after falling into it. They are not nameable by the player.

In an act of misdirection, the player is asked to name the "fallen human" without specifying whether it is the protagonist. In the "True Pacifist" route, it is revealed that the "fallen human" superficially resembled Frisk, but had arrived years earlier. Frisk has an androgynous appearance and is a silent protagonist, keeping their true origin and nature ambiguous.

=== Chara ===
Chara (/ˈkɑːrə, ˈkær-, ˈtʃɑːr-, ˈtʃær-/; KAR-ə, KARR-, CHAR-, CHARR-) was the first human child to fall into the Underground following the war between humans and monsters, prior to the events of Undertale. The player must choose a name for this character at the start of the game, but entering "Chara" triggers a message indicating it is "the true name". Chara was a misanthrope who climbed Mount Ebott for an "unhappy reason", and was adopted by Toriel and Asgore after falling into the Underground. Chara eventually plotted with their foster brother, Asriel, to kill themself so that Asriel could absorb their soul and leave the Underground to collect enough human souls to destroy the Barrier. With partial control over Asriel's body, Chara picked up their own corpse and brought it to their village with the intent to use their "full power" against the enraged humans who saw them. Instead, Asriel resisted, leading to their deaths and Chara's eventual burial in the Ruins. Over the course of the game, Asriel, reincarnated as Flowey, sees Frisk as a resurrected version of Chara, but during the game's "True Pacifist" ending, he comes to terms with Chara's death. In the game's "Genocide" route, Chara's spirit overtakes Frisk's, and they are eventually resurrected as a soulless and malicious entity who now seeks to erase the entire world, referring to themself as "the demon that comes when people call its name".

=== Flowey ===
Flowey is a flower who initially pretends to be kind-hearted, but is truthfully a sadistic sociopath who adheres to a "kill or be killed" philosophy. Prior to the player character's arrival, he had the ability to operate outside the laws of the universe via saving and loading save files. He regains this ability at the end of the game's "Neutral" route, when he kills Asgore and absorbs the human souls the king had been collecting to transform into a powerful, eldritch version of himself known as "Photoshop Flowey" or "Omega Flowey." If he is spared after his fight as Photoshop Flowey, he says he cannot understand the player character's kindness towards him despite his threat to murder their loved ones, and gives tips to the player on how to get a better outcome. He is later revealed to be the reincarnation of Asriel Dreemurr, the deceased prince of the Underground. Flowey, like Undyne, possesses Determination, as Alphys injected it into one of Asgore's first golden flowers during her experiments.

=== Mettaton ===
In Undertale, Mettaton is a robotic entertainer who is the Underground's sole celebrity, hosting various television shows and having products, brands, and a hotel in Hotland themed after him. He is an egotistical glory-seeker and wishes to take a human soul to travel to the surface and become a celebrity among the humans, and tricks Alphys into helping the protagonist reach the CORE so he can kill them under the pretenses of making her look like a hero. It is revealed through diaries in an abandoned house that Mettaton was originally a ghost who dreamed of creating a perfect body for himself. He achieved this when he befriended Alphys and she created his body (in order to make Asgore think he was an artificial soul), though at the cost of abandoning his cousin Napstablook. In the "Genocide" route, Mettaton transforms into a seemingly powerful form called Mettaton NEO, but the player kills him in one hit. In the "True Pacifist" route, he reunites with Napstablook, who becomes his sound mixer.

Mettaton is never directly confirmed to exist in Deltarune, but he is heavily implied to be the unseen "nobody" in Napstablook's house. In Chapters 4 and 5, if specific requirements have been met, the player has the option to give the "nobody" Tenna's Light World form, Toriel's old TV.

=== W.D. Gaster ===
In Undertale, W.D. Gaster, often referred to as "Dr. Gaster" or simply "Gaster," is said to have been the Royal Scientist before Alphys. He reportedly created the CORE, the Underground's geothermal power system. He disappeared abruptly and mysteriously, and his sheer brilliance made it difficult to find a replacement. Gaster's presence in the game is hidden, only being directly mentioned in rare easter eggs and internal game data discoverable through data mining. Despite his near-complete absence from the game, the mystery surrounding his characterization and presence has caused him to gain a sizable fan following.

In Deltarune, while he has not yet been seen, Gaster is strongly implied, by hints both in-game and in promotional material, to be tied to the game's overarching story.

== Exclusive to Deltarune ==
=== Kris Dreemurr ===
Kris is the primary protagonist of Deltarune. An introverted teenage human adopted by the Dreemurr family, Kris is characterized by other characters in the game as naturally mischievous, chaotic, and troubled, with references made to pranks and an interest in the occult. They are one of the prophesized heroes, alongside Susie and Ralsei, and wield a sword in combat.

While Kris is the player character, there is a separation between Kris as a character and the player as a separate entity that controls the soul residing in Kris's body. Kris's actions are typically controlled via the player's inputs, but control can occasionally move to other characters. Characters who knew Kris prior to the game's events often note the absence of their usual personality during the player's influence, and it is shown throughout the game that Kris harbors their own thoughts and feelings outside of the player. They occasionally hinder or contradict the player's choices, or even wrestle back control of their body by removing their soul; however, Chapter 5's opening implies that doing the latter for extended periods renders them weak and pale.

It is implied that Kris is working with the game's main antagonist, the Roaring Knight. Despite their quest nominally involving sealing Dark Fountains to prevent The Roaring, Kris is seen secretly opening at least two Dark Fountains themself, and they routinely hinder efforts to obtain codes to Hometown's shelter.

=== Susie ===
Susie is a purple, reptilian-like girl with a gruff, tomboyish appearance and demeanor. She is one of the prophesized heroes, alongside Kris and Ralsei, and wields an axe in combat. Reclusive and shunned by her Hometown peers, she is something of a bully at the start of the game, and scorns her role in the prophecy when initially meeting Ralsei in the Dark World. She allies herself with Lancer against the rest of the party in protest, but she gradually warms up to the rest of the party and embraces her destiny. In Chapter 2, she starts learning healing magic, which becomes more powerful as the game goes on. Despite her aggressive tendencies, Susie is fiercely protective of her friends and allies, and she grows more willing to open up to them.

Susie's relationship with Noelle Holiday is a significant part of her character development. Starting out as a mutual unspoken crush, their interactions in Chapter 2 motivate Susie to become more vulnerable and protective towards her friends. In Chapter 4, Susie visits Noelle's house, and the two bond further. In Chapter 5, Susie accompanies Noelle to Hometown's annual Festival, culminating in the two sharing a romantic moment on the shore of the town's lake. At the end of the chapter, Susie decides that Noelle needs to be informed properly about the existence of Dark Worlds, and prepares the Castle Town Dark World to welcome her the next day.

Susie's Undertale counterpart is generally understood to be an unseen character named "Suzy". In that game, a rare non-playable character expresses a desire for the protagonist to befriend Suzy, her "neighbor's daughter". In Undertale's Nintendo Switch release, which released the month before Deltarune's first chapter, the character has a chance of giving additional dialogue, cryptically stating that their meeting "is fast approaching".

=== Ralsei ===
Ralsei (/ˈrælseɪ, ˈrɔːl-/; RAL-say, RAWL-) is a goat-like prince from the Dark World with a soft, androgynous appearance. One of the prophesized heroes alongside Kris and Susie, he is the party's healer and is known for his gentle demeanor and compassionate personality. In Chapter 1, he wears a green robe and a wizard-like hat that conceals him in shadow, but he removes the hat at the end of the chapter to reveal his true face. His name is an anagram of Asriel's, and although his face resembles Asriel's as well, multiple characters state that this resemblance is only superficial.

Ralsei is introduced in the Dark World as a Darkner prince who has been waiting for the Lightner heroes to arrive and fulfill a prophecy. He explains to Kris and Susie that they must travel together to seal the Dark Fountains and save the Light and Dark worlds from descending into chaos. Later chapters show Ralsei struggling with self-esteem issues stemming from his status as a Darkner, with his self-worth centered on his servitude to Lightners. In Chapter 4, he admits to Susie and Kris that he has been hiding the full prophecy from them out of fear for their safety. In Chapter 5, Ralsei is more assertive, as he frequently argues with Flowery about the latter's disregard for the Dark World's "rules".

Reviewers describe him as an "adorable" and "charming" character with a kind-hearted nature. Connor Christie of Pocket Tactis wrote that Ralsei "functions as a sort of yin to Susie's yang, preferring to stay calm and ACT where possible rather than engage in combat".

=== Noelle Holiday ===
Noelle Holiday is a timid student resembling an anthropomorphic reindeer, who is a childhood friend and classmate of Kris and has a crush on Susie. She briefly joins the player's party in Chapters 2, 4 and 5. In the Dark World, she wears a white robe and is proficient in ice magic. Kris and Susie convince her and Berdly that their Dark World adventure in Chapter 2 is a dream, though by the end of Chapter 5 Susie resolves to include her in the party more properly. Noelle has an older sister named December or "Dess", who is implied to be missing or dead.

Noelle is the central focus of the game's "Weird Route," which starts with her being subjugated by the player over the course of Chapter 2 into following their orders until she freezes Berdly, sending him to hospital in the Light World. If the Weird Route is continued into Chapter 5, she will meet with Kris at the lake, begging them to help her "do something crazy." The scene ends with the pair walking into the water until it covers their heads while the screen fades to white.

=== Berdly ===
Berdly is a monster in Hometown resembling an anthropomorphic bluebird. He is a snobbish student with a superiority complex, who considers himself Noelle's ideal partner and a rival to Kris. In Chapter 2, he appears in the Dark World working with Queen, intending to establish an ideal world for himself and Noelle. Queen eventually betrays Berdly, and he reluctantly teams up with the party. After he fails to assist with a puzzle, he reveals that his superiority complex stems from him beating Noelle in a spelling bee many years ago, and that he has constantly pressured himself to surpass her ever since. At the party's urging, he resolves to treat himself and others with more leniency. When the dark fountain is closed, Berdly and Noelle are convinced that the events in the Dark World were a dream. He later reappears in Hometown during Chapters 4 and 5, participating at church and the annual Festival.

During the game's alternate "Weird Route", the player manipulates Noelle into freezing Berdly solid with a powerful spell during Chapter 2. After the dark fountain is closed, Berdly appears unresponsive in the Light World. In Chapter 4, he can be found hospitalized, lying in a coma.

=== The Roaring Knight ===
The Roaring Knight is the main antagonist of Deltarune. They (Note: The Roaring Knight is variously referred to in-game with "they/them" pronouns and "it/its" pronouns. For consistency, this article uses "they/them.") have a slim, angular body, with antler-like horns and a helm resembling a frog-mouth helm. Their influence is teased by various characters throughout Chapters 1 and 2. The Knight makes their first appearance at the end of Chapter 3, where they destroy Tenna and battle the main party. While the party can optionally "defeat" the Knight and obtain a Shadow Crystal, acting as the chapter's "secret" boss, they are downed in a cutscene afterwards regardless. The party is then saved by Officer Undyne, who is kidnapped by the Knight and taken to the shelter south of town.

The Knight serves as the main antagonist of Chapter 4. They fend off an attack by Kris and Susie at the start of the Dark Sanctuary, and at the end of the chapter, they create another Dark Fountain in the Dark World, spawning a Titan, a harbinger of The Roaring; the party manages to defeat it with help from an Old Man. The Knight next appears at the end of Chapter 5, kidnapping Asgore and critically wounding Flowery.

=== Lancer ===
Lancer is a miniboss in Chapter 1, a personified Jack of Spades card who befriends the protagonists and becomes a recurring character. He is the son of King, the final boss of Chapter 1. He is energetic yet incompetent in his attempts to stop the heroes to earn his father's respect. His gradually-developing friendship with Susie is what causes him to rebel against his father and assist the protagonists. In Chapter 2, he helps Kris escape captivity, but turned into stone afterwards. In Chapter 3, he helps the party during Tenna's "boards" and helps them defeat Rouxls Kaard.

=== Rouxls Kaard ===
Rouxls Kaard (/ruːlz/; ROOLZ) is a personified rules card and recurring miniboss. He speaks in exaggerated and comedically botched Early Modern English, and desires to be the second-in-command of any evil ruler.

He debuts in Chapter 1 as the "Duke of Puzzles" and King's right hand man who tries to stop the heroes in comedic and pathetically incompetent ways, before becoming a shopkeeper later on. In Chapter 2, he follows the heroes to the Cyber World and tries to impress Queen by defeating Kris and Ralsei and "conquering" the tiny houses in her mansion's acid pool. In Chapter 3, he briefly enters a polyamorous relationship with Tenna's second-in-commands Lanino and Elnina, incorrectly assuming that the relationship makes him Tenna's right hand man by association.

=== Jevil ===
Jevil is a personified Joker card who appears in Chapter 1. He was the former court jester and partner of the former magician and now shopkeeper, Seam, but was locked away after an interaction with an unknown figure drove him to madness. He began to see his whole world as merely a game and all its inhabitants as parts of it, influencing Seam to adopt a similarly nihilistic outlook on life. Despite being locked in a cell, he now believes all the other inhabitants of the Dark World have imprisoned themselves and he is the only free Darkner remaining. Upon being set free, he challenges the party to a battle as a "game," thus serving as the secret boss of Chapter 1.

=== King ===
King, also known as Chaos King, is the main antagonist and final boss of Chapter 1, a tyrannical figure who is zealously dedicated to the Knight and shows little care for his subjects or family. He is a personified King of Spades card and Lancer's father. Originally one of four kings who ruled over the Card Kingdom, he was put in power when the Knight created their Dark Fountain and overthrew the other three kings; he plans to take over the Light World as retribution for the Lightners abandoning him after his Light World form was accidentally torn. After his defeat, he is imprisoned in Castle Town's dungeon, where he has remained since Chapter 2.

=== Queen ===
Queen, real name "Serial Number Q5U4EX7YY2E9N," is the main antagonist and final boss of Chapter 2. She is a personified laptop who attempts to capture the party multiple times, although she is mostly friendly, eccentric, and does not understand the threat the Dark Fountains pose until Ralsei explains it to her, causing her to stop her plans. While she partners with Berdly to capture the party, she dislikes him, to the point of routinely forgetting his name. She possesses a gigantic robot called GIGA Queen, which acts as the final boss of the chapter, and is fought in a similar gameplay style to the Punch-Out!! series.

=== Spamton G. Spamton ===
Spamton G. Spamton is a personified spambot who resembles a marionette. He speaks in mangled, cryptic English peppered with bracketed marketing keywords like that of a spam email with broken hyperlinks. Spamton has the personality of a used car salesman, and is obsessed with becoming a "Big Shot". He often states that he and Kris are alike in some way and that he is trapped as well, but usually projects his own flaws onto them.

After his appearance as a miniboss in the middle of Chapter 2, he functions as a shopkeeper, selling dysfunctional items for rapidly fluctuating prices, and then as the chapter's secret boss, where he is known as Spamton NEO, after merging with a defunct robotic body designed by a Lightner. Before the game's events, he was a normal salesman who rose to success after communicating with an anonymous voice on his phone, but lost his job, home, and sanity when the voice abandoned him. In the Chapter's "Weird Route," he sells the ThornRing used to freeze Berdly, and his NEO form serves as the chapter's final boss. Spamton is alluded to numerous times in Chapter 3 due to his connection to Tenna, though his only physical appearance in the chapter is in a short easter egg scene. Tenna and Spamton formerly worked together, with Spamton once promising, but never giving, Tenna his secret to fame and success.

=== Mr. (Ant) Tenna ===
Mr. (Ant) Tenna, or simply Tenna, is the main antagonist and penultimate boss of Chapter 3. He is the personification of the Dreemurr family's disused CRT television, operating as a game show host. His speech contains images in the place of certain text. He takes the main cast through 8-bit-styled "boards" and engages Kris, Susie and Ralsei in various minigames with an enthusiastic attitude, but is shown to be lonely as a result of the Dreemurr family using him less and less. When the main cast finds Toriel imprisoned in a gachapon ball, Tenna attempts to trap the cast as well, but they escape. After the protagonists defeat him at the climax of the chapter, Tenna agrees to release Toriel. However, before he can do so, he is suddenly struck down by The Roaring Knight. Depending on the player's actions, he may either remain broken (implicitly dead), or he can be fixed and either given away to a "nobody" in Hometown or reside in Castle Town where he entertains King.

=== Lanino and Elnina ===
Lanino and Elnina are two weather-themed Darkners in a romantic relationship, with Lanino representing the Sun and Moon, and Elnina representing clouds and precipitation. They appear in Chapter 3 as part of Tenna's game show, initially serving as a miniboss encounter. During the fight, the Lightners' actions cause them to break off their relationship. They eventually end up in a reluctant polyamorous relationship with Rouxls Kaard, who mistakenly believes that dating the two of them makes him Tenna's second-in-command by association. They break off their relationship with Rouxls during a subsequent fight with the Lightners, and resume their previous relationship.

In Chapters 4 and 5, they appear in the Castle Town dojo.

=== The Seven Colored Flowers ===
The Seven Colored Flowers are recurring mini-boss antagonists in Chapter 5. They are Dark World incarnations of the seven flowers that made up the bouquet Asgore presented to Toriel for his marriage proposal, which he has continued to care for in his flower shop; due to being living plants in the Light World, they are technically neither Darkner nor Lightner. They consist of Flowery, Aqua, Seth, Yellow, Blue, Green, and Orange.

Most of the Flowers take on humanoid forms, with the exception of Orange, who resembles a mouse. Aqua is a playful young girl, Seth is an intellectual tactician, Yellow is a gullible cowboy, Blue is a kindhearted ballet dancer, Green is a generous chef, and Orange is an insecure aspiring boxer.

==== Flowery ====
Flowery is the main antagonist of Chapter 5, and is seen in Asgore's company. He is the incarnation of the golden flower that appears in Asgore's flower shop. Indebted to Asgore for caring for him and the other Colored Flowers for years after the wedding, Flowery describes himself as Asgore's college roommate and "best friend." His first appearance comes in the form of an anime-style cutscene animated by Studio Khara, and his speech and behavior are reminiscent of early English anime dubs, with an overly cheerful demeanor, occasionally incorrect syntax, and bizarre non sequiturs. He mainly tries to stop the party from sealing the fountain to keep Asgore and the six other Flowers happy. The Roaring Knight cuts Flowery in half after he attempts to stop them from kidnapping Asgore; Susie tapes up and replants his corresponding flower in the Light World after the Dark Fountain is sealed.

His name, his boss music, and some of his dialogue allude to Flowey, who similarly took form from a golden flower belonging to Asgore in Undertale.

== Reception ==
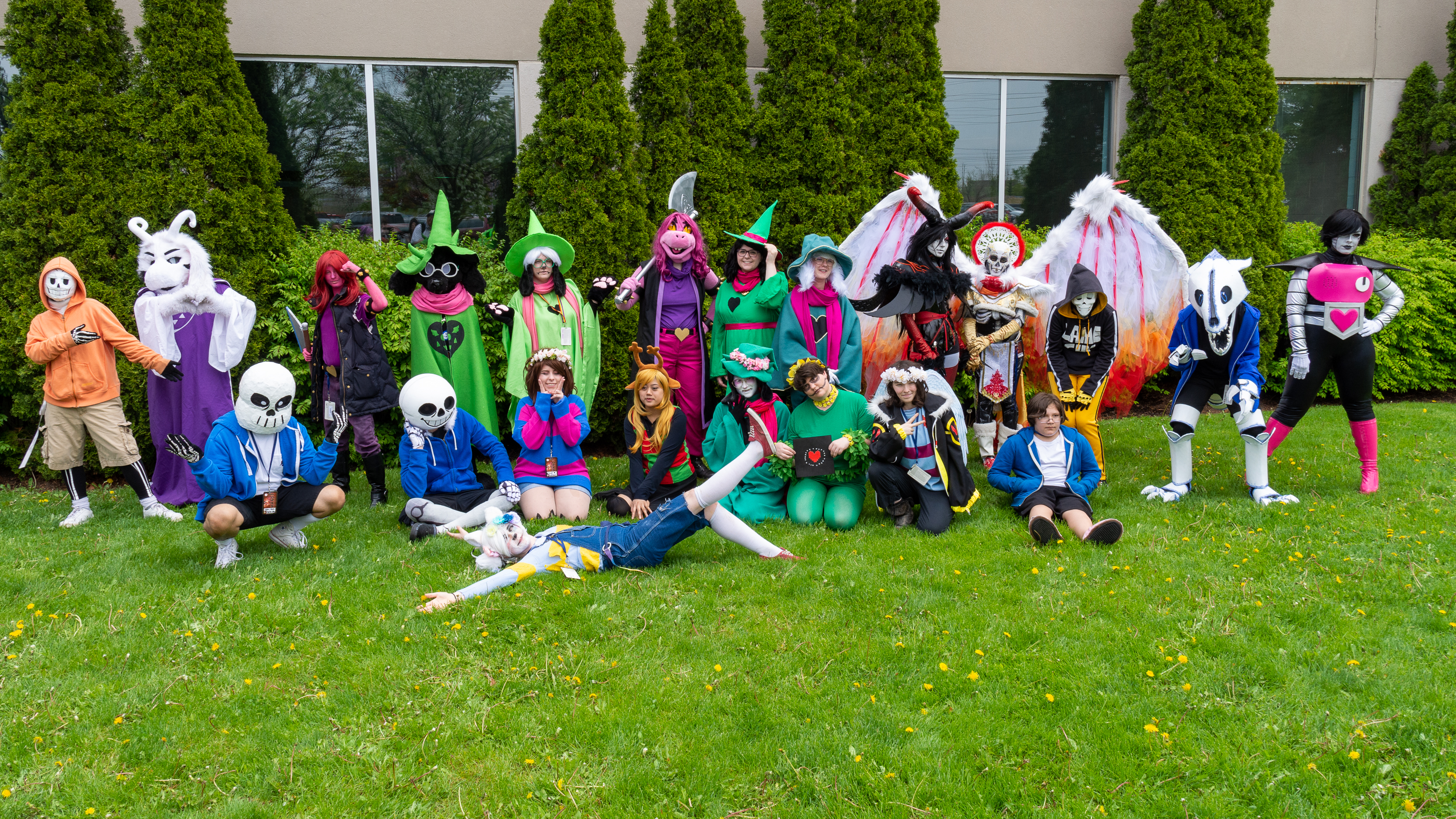
Cosplay of various Undertale and Deltarune characters, including fan-made variations

Griffin McElroy of Polygon described Undertale's characters in general as "incredibly vulnerable", stating that he felt "real affection" for all of them after getting to know them. He called the game his most memorable gaming experience of the year due to his moral compass being guided by this connection. Noting that the characters were "well-written and relatable", he remarked that, when doing the genocide run out of a desire to see all the game's content, he felt "genuinely terrible".

Richard Cobbett of Eurogamer stated that Undertale's characters were "layered" by RPG standards, calling them "not exactly Walter White in terms of complexity," but more deep than they initially seemed. Using the example of Sans, a "surprisingly complex figure," he noted that "most of the main characters are living with at least one unfortunate past decision or regret." He called the responsiveness of the world and characters an important part of Undertale's success, stating that "spending more time with familiar faces makes them feel real." In a separate review in PC Gamer, he called the game's characters "adorable," saying he had not laughed so hard in years.

Axel Bosso of Bloody Disgusting stated that Undertale's characters were difficult to trust, causing an anxious feeling with every encounter, starting with Flowey's switch from seemingly harmless to evil. Noting that "even the most inconsequential NPCs have an existential crisis and/or nihilism vibes around them," he said that it was "hard [...] to feel safe in this treacherous environment," though nevertheless remarking that "they became some of my most loved cast in quite some time."

Brendan Graeber of IGN positively highlighted the relationship between Kris and Susie in Deltarune, calling them "a dumbass duo with joint custody of a brain cell." He also called attention to the latter's character development throughout the game.
