= Fangamer =

Video game merchandising company

Fangamer LLC
- Type: Private
- Industry: Manufacturing
- Founded: 2007
- Headquarters: Tucson, Arizona, United States
- Number of locations: 3 offices
- Key people: Reid Young (CEO)
- Website: fangamer.com

Fangamer LLC is an American video game merchandising company and game publisher based in Tucson, Arizona. It was originally spun out from Starmen.net, an EarthBound online forum. It operates an online store that sells licensed indie game merchandise items such as hats, pins, vinyl records, t-shirts and other products. The company has also published physical editions of independent video games.

== History ==
Starmen.net, an online forum, began selling T-shirts and mugs in 2007 as a way to pay for the server costs of the site. One of the creators of the site stated, "Well, the ads weren't paying the bills, so we thought, 'What if we took the kinda-crappy print-on-demand stuff we're making on CafePress, and we did it at a much higher-quality?'". The next year, Fangamer was launched with an initial offering of "two t-shirts, a pin set, and a mug" based on EarthBound. After the success of this initial run of merchandise, Fangamer started to expand into creating items for other games such as Ace Attorney and Chrono Trigger. To avoid infringement of the various video game properties they were creating items for at the time, the site avoided using designs with any copyrighted symbols. Fangamer also produced physical copies of Starmen.net's unofficial player's guide for Mother 3.

Since 2010, Fangamer have been attending events like PAX, and holds regular "Camp Fangamer". For the 2015 Camp Fangamer, they had a custom arcade version of EarthBound that randomizes enemy names, stats, items, and NPC sprites. The arcade version was played and streamed all weekend long, with proceeds going to charity. In the mid-2010's Fangamer became known as a fulfillment partner for video game Kickstarters, providing merchandise for the campaigns of games such as Broken Age and Bloodstained: Ritual of the Night. After partnering with Toby Fox to create merchandise for Undertale, the site experienced a higher number of sales, with a cofounder saying "I thought there was a glitch in Shopify... Undertale had become just an incredible phenomenon.” This success allowed Fangamer to expand into acquiring licenses for other video game proprieties, going on to create merchandise for games such as Hollow Knight and Banjo-Kazooie.

== Games published ==
Title	Original release year	Developer(s)	Genre(s)	Platforms	Release date(s)	Ref.
20XX/30XX	2017 (20XX), 2023 (30XX)	Batterystaple Games, Fire Hose Games	Platform	Nintendo Switch	November 7, 2025	
Antonblast	2024	Summitsphere	Platform	Nintendo Switch	November 7, 2025	
Baba is You	2019	Hempuli, MP2 Games	Puzzle	Nintendo Switch	June 14, 2022	
Bugsnax	2020	Young Horses	Adventure	PlayStation 4, PlayStation 5, Nintendo Switch	2021–2022	
Celeste	2018	Maddy Makes Games, Extremely OK Games	Platform	PlayStation 4, Nintendo Switch	June 30, 2023	
Citizen Sleeper	2022	Jump Over the Age, Fellow Traveller Games	Role-playing	Nintendo Switch	June 28, 2024	
Crow Country	2024	SFB Games	Survival horror	PlayStation 5, Nintendo Switch	November 7, 2025	
Demon Turf + Demon Tides	2026	Fabraz	Platform	Nintendo Switch	2026	
Faith: The Unholy Trinity	2022	Airdorf Games, New Blood Interactive	Survival horror	Nintendo Switch	October 25, 2024	
Frog Detective: The Entire Mystery	2018-2022	Worm Club, Superhot Presents	Adventure	Nintendo Switch	August 9, 2024	
Hollow Knight	2017	Team Cherry, Shark Jump Studios	Metroidvania	PlayStation 4, Nintendo Switch, PC	May 31, 2019	
Hollow Knight: Silksong	2025	Team Cherry	Metroidvania	PlayStation 5, Nintendo Switch, Xbox Series X	May 28, 2026	
Hypnospace Outlaw	2019	Tendershoot	Simulation	Nintendo Switch	September 24, 2021	
Into the Breach	2018	Subset Games	Turn-based strategy	Nintendo Switch	October 21, 2022	
Later Alligator	2019	Pillow Fight	Adventure	Nintendo Switch	April 16, 2021	
Little Kitty, Big City	2024	Double Dagger Studio	Adventure	Nintendo Switch	March 28, 2025	
Luck Be a Landlord	2023	TrampolineTales	Roguelike deck-building	Nintendo Switch	September 19, 2025	
Mouthwashing	2024	Wrong Organ, Critical Reflex	Horror, adventure	PlayStation 5, Nintendo Switch	2025	
Off	2008	Unproductive Fun Time	Role-playing	PC (digital), Nintendo Switch	2025	
Omori	2020	Omocat, MP2 Games	Role-playing	PlayStation 4, Nintendo Switch	July 17, 2022	
Ooblets	2022	Glumberland	Life simulation	Nintendo Switch	2022	
Pizza Tower	2023	Tour De Pizza	Platform	Nintendo Switch	October 10, 2025	
Slime Rancher: Plortable Edition	2021	Monomi Park	Life simulation, adventure	Nintendo Switch	October 27, 2022	
Stardew Valley	2016	ConcernedApe	Simulation, role-playing	Nintendo Switch	November 6, 2020	
Tunic	2022	Finji	Action-adventure	PlayStation 4, Nintendo Switch	July 28, 2023	
UFO 50	2024	Mossmouth, LLC	Various	Nintendo Switch	February 20, 2026	
Undertale	2017	Toby Fox, 8-4	Role-playing	PlayStation 4, PlayStation Vita, Xbox One, Nintendo Switch	2017–2021	
World of Horror	2020	Panstasz, Ysbryd Games	Role-playing	Nintendo Switch	October 19, 2023	
