= Temmie Chang =

Video game animator and developer (born 1993)

- Born: April 3, 1993 (age 33)
- Other name: Tuyoki
- Education: Pratt Institute
- Occupations: Illustrator; animator; video game developer
- Years active: 2009–present

Signature
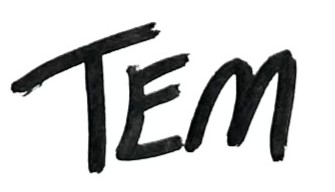

Temmie Chang (born April 3, 1993), also known as Tuyoki, is an American video game animator, illustrator, and developer. She is best known for her work as the main artist and animator for the critically acclaimed indie role-playing games Undertale and Deltarune, in which she appears as a self-insert character. In 2018, she released Escaped Chasm, her first foray as the creator of an RPG maker game. In 2020, she released Dweller's Empty Path.

== Early life and education ==
Temmie Chang was born on April 3, 1993. Chang became interested in video game universes as a child watching her cousin play Breath of Fire. Around 2006, she began sharing her digital art on DeviantArt. She went on to study 2D animation at the Pratt Institute in New York.

== Career ==
Chang is best known for working with Toby Fox (left) on his games Undertale and Deltarune, in which self-insertion characters of Chang (face right) exist.

Around early 2013, Toby Fox, who was developing the role-playing game (RPG) Undertale, was looking for an artist to work on his game and discovered Chang's blog. Even though Fox never talked to her before, he asked her if she was willing to help; she agreed.

Chang was primarily responsible for its most complex elements, including cutscenes and several characters. Her most notable characters are the Temmies, a dog-cat mixture species derived from a sketch by artist Betty Kwong, named after Chang.

The widespread acclaim and commercial success of Undertale allowed Chang to pay off her student loans and gain notice for her work. She regularly works with the animation studio Yotta and has collaborated with video game developers WayForward and Team Meat.

Chang has released two RPG Maker games, including Escaped Chasm (2019), followed by Dweller's Empty Path (2020). Fox worked on the music for both games, while Japanese composer Camellia also worked on Dweller's, arranging most of its music.

She returned as the main artist and animator for Fox's next game, Deltarune, which began releasing in chapters in 2018.

== Style and themes ==
Chang is known for her distinctive style of pixel art and animation with flexible lines and dynamic subjects, conveying a sense of nostalgia.

== Works ==
Year	Title	Role	Cite
2010	Momodora I	Title screen artist	
2011	Momodora II	Title screen artist	
2015	Undertale	Artist, animator, character designer	
2016	Eddsworld	Background artist; "The End (Part 1)"	
2016	OK K.O.! Let's Be Heroes	Animation direction, color design; "Enid's Bad Day"	
2016	Shantae: Half-Genie Hero	Character animator	
2017	Hiveswap: Act 1	Animator	
2018	Extinction	Character animator	
2018	Dwellers of the Mountain's Forest	Editor, Art Director, Animator, Background artist, Character Designer, Writer and Director	
2018	Deltarune Chapter 1	Main artist and animator	
2019	Shantae and the Seven Sirens	Animator	
2019	Indivisible	Illustrator, pixel artist, animator	
2019	Escaped Chasm	Story, illustrator, pixel artist, cutscene and pixel animator	
2019	Blackmagik Blazing (Camellia's 11th studio album)	Cover artist	
2020	Dweller's Empty Path	Concept, story, character designer, musician, artist, illustration, pixel artist, animator	
2020	Super Meat Boy Forever	Character and cutscene animator	
2021	U.U.F.O (Camellia's 14th studio album)	Cover artist	
2021	Deltarune Chapter 2	Main artist and animator	
2022	OneShot: World Machine Edition	Guest artist (wallpapers)	
2024	Breachtale	Original Character Design	
2025	Deltarune Chapters 3 & 4	Main artist and animator	
2026	Deltarune Chapter 5	Main artist and animator	
2026	Insomnia C(o)urse (Camellia's 18th Studio Album)	Cover artist	
