= Godzilla and Godzilla Raids Again =

1955 Godzilla novellas by Shigeru Kayama

- Cover of the 2023 English-language edition
- Author: Shigeru Kayama
- Audio read by: Kaipo Schwab
- Original title: ゴジラ 東京・大阪篇
- Translator: Jeffrey Angles
- Language: Japanese
- Subject: Godzilla
- Genre: Kaiju
- Publisher: Shimamura Shuppan
- Publication date: July 1955
- Publication place: Japan
- English publication date: October 3, 2023, by University of Minnesota Press
- Media type: Print (Paperback)
- Pages: 248
- ISBN: 978-1-5179-1523-0

Godzilla and Godzilla Raids Again (Japanese: ゴジラ 東京・大阪篇, Hepburn: Gojira: Tōkyō/Ōsaka-hen; lit. 'Godzilla: Tokyo/Osaka Editions') is a 1955 young adult kaiju novel by Shigeru Kayama. It is a novelization of the first two films in the Godzilla franchise produced by Toho, Godzilla (1954) and Godzilla Raids Again (1955), both of which were based on story outlines by Kayama.

== Background ==
In March 1954, a fishing vessel named the Lucky Dragon No. 5 accidentally found itself near Bikini Atoll in the Marshall Islands, where the U.S. military was testing hydrogen bombs as part of a project known as Castle Bravo. All of the twenty-three crew members came down with acute radiation poisoning, and one, Aikichi Kuboyama, died within the year. Subsequent investigations showed that the tuna that their boat and others had brought to Japan showed signs of radioactivity, and this sparked panic about radiation throughout Japan.

Wanting to capitalize on the wave of radiation-related anxiety sweeping Japan, in early 1954, the producer Tomoyuki Tanaka from Toho Studios approached the popular science-fiction writer Shigeru Kayama to come up with a screenplay about a radioactive kaiju monster.

When Kayama wrote the scenario that would become the basis for the screenplay for Godzilla, he conceived of the film as a means to express his concern about nuclear weapons. At the beginning of the scenario, Kayama included an extended voice-over commentary about the dangers of nuclear weapons, but in subsequent edits, the director Ishirō Honda and his co-writer removed much of Kayama's direct, heavy-handed language condemning nuclear proliferation. In a round table after the film's release, Kayama indicated that he did not mind these changes. He said, "As the one responsible for the creation of the story, I was really worried about what kind of film it would become; however, the film exceeded all my expectations."

After the great success of Godzilla, Toho Studios approached Kayama about writing a screenplay for the sequel, Godzilla Raids Again, which would be directed by Motoyoshi Oda and released in 1955. Because Kayama had killed off Godzilla with a fictitious device called the Oxygen Destroyer at the end of the 1954 film, he found writing a screenplay a challenge but drafted the sequel Godzilla Raids Again in a short period of time.

== Publication history ==
Around the time Godzilla Raids Again came to theaters in April 1955, Kayama published the two novellas Godzilla and Godzilla Raids Again in a single volume labeled "Youth Library" (Shōnen bunko) from the publisher Shimamura Shuppan. Literary historian Jeffrey Angles has argued that Kayama used these novellas, which he penned himself, as a means to reassert his nuclear message. In them one finds that Kayama introduces his story with a brief, anti-nuclear statement that suggests one should read the novellas as form of protest literature. Details of the plot do differ, especially from the 1954 film; however, given that these novellas were written by the same author who drafted the scenarios for the famous films, they continue to be read by generations of Japanese readers even today. In 2023, University of Minnesota Press published the first official English translation.
