= List of fictional scientists and engineers =

In addition to the archetypical mad scientist, there are fictional characters who are scientists and engineers who go above and beyond the regular demands of their professions to use their skills and knowledge for the betterment of others, often at great personal risk. This is a list of fictional scientists and engineers, an alphabetical overview of notable characters in the category.

== In literature ==
- Martin Arrowsmith (Arrowsmith)
- Joseph Cavor (The First Men in the Moon) – Inventor of Cavorite, an anti-gravity material.
- Captain Hagbard Celine (Illuminatus) – Captain who fights the Illuminati from his submarine and with his computer, both designed by himself.
- Norma Cenva (Legends of Dune) – Inventor of the space folding engine.
- Captain Jaylen Cresida (The Lost Fleet) – Captain in the Alliance Navy under the command of Captain John "Black Jack" Geary, and an expert on hypernet gates.
- Dr. Claire Deller (I, Robot and other stories by Isaac Asimov) – Chief robot genius of San Diego Robots and Mechanical Men.
- Martin Dubois (Project Hail Mary) – Scientist.
- Leonid Gorbovsky (Noon Universe) – Genius scientist, progressor and spaceship captain, known for his ability to land on planets to survive planet-wide catastrophes and make contact with alien civilizations.
- Dr. Ryland Grace (Project Hail Mary) – Molecular biologist.
- Leo Graf (Falling Free) – Space engineer who leads a group of genetically engineered four-armed humans known as "quaddies" to freedom.
- Olesya Ilyukhina (Project Hail Mary) – Materials specialist and engineer.
- Gennady Komov (Noon Universe) – Xenopsychologist whose main occupation is making contact with and studying alien civilizations.
- Pardot Kynes (Prelude to Dune) – Planetologist.
- Melissa Lewis (The Martian) – Biologist and astronaut.
- Liet-Kynes (Dune) – Planetologist.
- William Harper "Johnny" Littlejohn (Doc Savage) – Archaeologist and associate of Doc Savage.
- Lt. Col Andrew Blodgett "Monk" Mayfair (Doc Savage) – Chemist associate of Doc Savage.
- Dr. Morel (The Invention of Morel) – Inventor of a machine that records and reproduces reality.
- The Other Mother (Coraline)
- Captain Nemo (Twenty Thousand Leagues Under the Seas and The Mysterious Island) – Ambiguous-to-villainous figure, who later assumes a heroic role.
- Mindy Park (The Martian) – Satellite communications engineer, mechanical engineer.
- Rich Purnell (The Martian) – Astrodynamicist.
- Leonard of Quirm (Discworld) – Super-intelligent clockpunk engineer.
- Col John "Renny" Renwick (Doc Savage) – Civil engineer and associate of Doc Savage.
- Maj Thomas J. "Long Tom" Roberts (Doc Savage) – Electrical engineer and associate of Doc Savage.
- Rocky (Project Hail Mary) – Engineer.
- Dr. Clark Savage, Jr., aka. Doc Savage (Doc Savage) – Surgeon, scientist, adventurer, inventor, explorer, and musician.
- Arne Saknussemm (Journey to the Center of the Earth) – 16th-century Icelandic naturalist, alchemist, and traveler whose messages guide a group of 19th-century adventurers.
- Hari Seldon (Foundation) – Mathematician who invents psychohistory.
- Annie Shapiro (Project Hail Mary) – Biologist.
- Professor Shonku (Byomjatrir Diary, Professor Shonku o Robu, Professor Shonku o Khoka, Professor Shonku o Corvus, Ek Sringo Obhijaan, Swarnaparni and other works by Satyajit Ray) – World's most respected scientist and inventor and a physics professor at Scottish Church College. He invents several inventions while going on adventures he records in his diary.
- Cyrus Smith (The Mysterious Island) – Literary example of a 19th-century engineer.
- Doctor Steel – Real-life musician whose stage persona is a roboticist and transhumanist.
- Franny K. Stein – Child scientist who invents monsters to combat danger.
- Tom Swift and Tom Swift, Jr. – Father-and-son team of inventors.
- Crawford Tillinghast ("From Beyond") – Inventor of a machine which allows perception of normally imperceptible things.
- Professor Abraham Van Helsing (Dracula) – Nemesis of Count Dracula.
- Alex Vogel (The Martian) – Chemist, astrophysicist, and astronaut.
- Mark Watney (The Martian) – Botanist, mechanical engineer, and astronaut.
- Bertrand Zobrist (Inferno)

== Live-action films ==
=== Individual scientist/engineers in live-action films ===
- Eleanor Arroway (Contact) – A scientist who searches for extraterrestrial intelligence.
- Bruce Banner (Marvel Cinematic Universe) – A renowned scientist with 7 PhDs and a focus in gamma radiation.
- Buckaroo Banzai (The Adventures of Buckaroo Banzai Across the 8th Dimension) – A particle physicist, neurosurgeon, test pilot, martial artist, and rock star.
- Professor Barnhardt (The Day the Earth Stood Still) – An American scientist who organizes a scientific reception for Klaatu's message of peace.
- Dr. Glenn Barton (The Man and the Challenge) – A human-factors scientist.
- Blankman – A science whiz-nerd who believes he is a superhero and becomes one himself.
- Dr. Amelia Brand (Interstellar) – Biologist.
- Professor John Brand (Interstellar) – Physicist.
- Dr. Emmett Brown (Back to the Future) – An inventor of the Flux Capacitor, which makes time travel possible.
- Seth Brundle (The Fly) – An eccentric but brilliant physicist who invented the telepods, machines capable of teleportation.
- Sebastian Caine (Hollow Man) – A scientist part of a team that worked on an invisibility serum and its antidote, tested on animals. He goes insane when the invisibility serum tested on him became irreversible.
- Joseph Cooper (Interstellar) – Engineer, pilot, and astronaut.
- Murphy Cooper (Interstellar) – Physicist.
- Walter Curnow (2010: The Year We Make Contact) – American engineer.
- Jackson Curtis (2012) – A struggling science-fiction writer.
- Ian Donnelly (Arrival) – Physicist.
- Dr. Miles Dyson (Terminator 2: Judgment Day) – He learns of the destructive destiny of his future creation and later destroys his research.
- Dr. Stephen Falken (WarGames) – The creator of the Joshua computer program.
- Dr. Charles Forbin (Colossus: The Forbin Project) – The designer of Colossus.
- Dr. Clayton Forrester (The War of the Worlds)
- Charlie Frost (2012) – A fringe science conspiracy theorist and radio talk-show host.
- Dr. Leslie Gaskell (Kronos) – He comes up with a way to destroy the giant machine.
- Richard Hannay (The Thirty-Nine Steps and Greenmantle) – A British mining engineer who is the hero in John Buchan's World War I-era adventure novels.
- Adrian Helmsley (2012) – A geologist and chief science advisor to U.S. President Thomas Wilson.
- Dr. Newton Geiszler (Pacific Rim) – K-Science Officer in the biologist/research team.
- Dr. Hermann Gottlieb (Pacific Rim) – K-Science Officer in the mathematician/research team.
- Dr. Stanley Goodspeed (The Rock) – A FBI chemical weapons specialist.
- Corporal Hardin (Southern Comfort) – A chemical engineer on weekend maneuvers with Louisiana Army National Guard squad in rural bayou country as they antagonize and are hunted down by the local Cajun people. His day job is only relevant to explain his rational sensible approach.
- Indiana Jones (Indiana Jones) – An adventurous archaeologist.
- John Koestler (Knowing) – An astrophysicist at Massachusetts Institute of Technology, who is killed when the solar flare destroys Earth.
- David Levinson (Independence Day) – A cable-TV engineer who devises the trick that blocks the alien invasion.
- der Leitende – LI (Das Boot) – The chief engineer of U-96 portrayed by Klaus Wennemann after real-life chief engineer Friedrich (Fritz) Grade.
- Melissa Lewis (The Martian) – Biologist and astronaut
- Dr. Emilio Lizardo (The Adventures of Buckaroo Banzai Across the 8th Dimension) – A physicist whose mind is being controlled by the Black Lectroid, Lord John Whorfin.
- Ian Malcolm (Jurassic Park) – A mathematician and chaotician who survives several encounters with dinosaurs and other hazards. His mathematical prowess allows him to predict his own fate and that of the park's inhabitants.
- Dr. Russell A. Marvin (Earth vs. the Flying Saucers) – He invented the weapon that brought down the saucers.
- Leonora Orantes (Contagion) – A World Health Organization epidemiologist.
- Q (James Bond) – He makes the gadgets that James Bond uses; he is most often portrayed using the conventional literary trappings of a scientist, such as a white lab coat, though his activities are closer to engineering.
- Mindy Park (The Martian) – Satellite communications engineer, mechanical engineer.
- Dennis Parker (Alien) – Engineer.
- Rich Purnell (The Martian) – Astrodynamicist.
- Hank Rearden (Atlas Shrugged) – A metallurgist and railroad magnate who created Rearden metal.
- David Reed (Creature from the Black Lagoon) – In contrast to Mark Williams, a hypermasculine and ultimately destructive scientist.
- Ellen Ripley (Alien) – An engineer aboard the star ship Nostromo.
- Romilly (Interstellar) – Astrophysicist.
- Menlo Schwartzer (Surf II) – A reputedly brilliant chemist.
- Erik Selvig (Marvel Cinematic Universe) – An astrophysicist who worked with Jane Foster on her Wormhole research, associate of Thor and former partner of Bruce Banner. He later worked for S.H.I.E.L.D. to study the Tessaract.
- Dr. Daisuke Serizawa (Godzilla) – A scientist who invents the Oxygen Destroyer and uses it to kill Godzilla before destroying his notes and sacrificing himself so that his creation can never be misused.
- Dr. Jeffrey Stewart (The Magnetic Monster) – He personally destroyed the dangerous substance serranium.
- Dr. Thomas Stockmann (An Enemy of the People)
- Dr. Ryan Stone (Gravity) – A biomedical engineer at a hospital in Lake Zurich, who becomes a mission specialist at NASA.
- Satnam Surtani (2012) – An Indian astrophysicist.
- Alex Vogel (The Martian) – Chemist, astrophysicist, and astronaut,
- Professor Wayne Szalinski (Honey, I Shrunk the Kids) – The inventor of a shrink ray.
- Mark Watney (The Martian) – A botanist, mechanical engineer, and astronaut.
- Dr. William Weir (Event Horizon) – The designer of the titular spacecraft and its FTL propulsion system, the gravity drive.
- Steve Zissou (The Life Aquatic with Steve Zissou) – An eccentric oceanographer who sets out to exact revenge on a shark referred to as a "jaguar shark".

== In live-action television ==
=== Individual scientist/engineers in live-action television ===
- Reginald Barclay (Star Trek: The Next Generation and Star Trek: Voyager) – A diagnostic technician transferred to the USS Enterprise-D, who later played a key role in a later project which enabled regular contact with the missing Starfleet ship, USS Voyager.
- Janos Bartok (Legend) – A Hungarian scientist and inventor.
- Julian Bashir (Star Trek: Deep Space Nine) – The chief medical officer on Deep Space Nine.
- Beaker and Bunsen Honeydew (The Muppet Show) – Beaker is the assistant scientist of Bunsen, scientist and founder of Muppet Labs.
- Beakman (Beakman's World) – A general scientist who, in a funny and entertaining manner, teaches that science is a fact of life.
- Walter White (Breaking Bad) – A former chemist who, after being diagnosed with terminal lung cancer, begins manufacturing meth to provide for his family.
- Carson Beckett (Stargate Atlantis) – A medical doctor and geneticist who discovers the ATA gene and serves as the chief medical officer for the Atlantis expedition.
- Sam Beckett (Quantum Leap) – A Nobel Prize-winning quantum physicist with multiple doctorates who is caught in his own time-travel experiment; "leaping" into many lives along the span of his own lifetime. He must change the histories of those around him for the better before he can return home.
- Brains (Thunderbirds) – An engineer.
- Samantha Carter (Stargate SG-1) – A United States Air Force officer and astrophysicist whose scientific knowledge and engineering skills are used to combat various threats to her team and to Earth.
- Dr. Pierre Chang (Lost) – An astrophysicist.
- Ravi Chakrabarti (iZombie) – A medical examiner for the Seattle PD. He has studied the biology of zombies and made several attempts to develop a cure for the condition.
- Dr. Sheldon Cooper (The Big Bang Theory) – A theoretical physicist at Caltech.
- Professor Monty Corndog (The Aquabats / The Aquabats! Super Show!) – An eccentric scientist and inventor whose chemical creations transforms a group of ordinary men into the titular superheroes and rock musicians, who fight crime with the aid of the Professor's gadgets.
- Zefram Cochrane (Star Trek: The Original Series and Star Trek: First Contact) – The inventor of the warp drive.
- Beverly Crusher (Star Trek: The Next Generation) – The chief medical officer of the Enterprise-D.
- Data (Star Trek: The Next Generation) – The second officer and chief operations officer of the Enterprise-D, whose duties cover that of a science officer.
- Bill Davis (Family Affair) – A civil engineer.
- Davros (Doctor Who) – A Universal Genius from the planet Skaro and nemesis of the Doctor. He invented the Reality Bomb – a moon-sized machine which creates a wavelength with the ability to cancel the electrical field that holds atoms together using the Reality Bom, who intended to use it to destroy all life in the universes.
- Jadzia Dax (Star Trek: Deep Space Nine) – A science officer on Deep Space Nine.
- Ezri Dax (Star Trek: Deep Space Nine) – A counselor on Deep Space Nine.
- Dr. Richard Daystrom (Star Trek: The Original Series) – The inventor of the duotronic computer systems, the basic principles behind the computers on all Starfleet vessels.
- Dr. Linda Denman (H_{2}O: Just Add Water) – A marine biologist who wanted to prove the existence of merpeople.
- The Doctor (Doctor Who) – A super-intelligent alien who was educated as a scientist and uses his skills extensively in his adventures.
- The Doctor (Star Trek: Voyager) – Voyager's Emergency Medical Hologram.
- Stephen "Steve" Douglas (My Three Sons) – An aeronautical engineer.
- Dr. Amy Farrah Fowler (The Big Bang Theory) – A neurobiologist portrayed by real-life neuroscientist Mayim Bialik.
- Professor Sydney Fox (Relic Hunter) – An archaeologist.
- Stephen Franklin (Babylon 5)
- Dr. Goodfellow (Buck Rogers in the 25th Century)
- Dr. Ross Geller (Friends) – A paleontologist working at a museum in research and administration, and lecturer/professor at New York University.
- Dr. Horace Goodspeed (Lost) – A mathematician.
- Artemus Gordon (The Wild Wild West) – The brainy complement to James West's brawn.
- Max Hamilton (H_{2}O: Just Add Water)
- Professor Roy Hinkley (Gilligan's Island) – The respected de facto leader of the castaways. who usually represents the only real continual hope of rescue. He can make anything out of bamboo and coconuts, but cannot find a way to fix the S.S. Minnow or build a working boat.
- Dr. Leonard Hofstadter (The Big Bang Theory) – An experimental physicist at Caltech.
- Paige Howard (Zoey 101 )
- Dr. Elias Huer (Buck Rogers) – The chief scientist and inventor in the comic strip, movie serial and television series.
- Dr. Daniel Jackson (Stargate) – An archaeologist and linguist who figures out how to open the Stargate; his understanding of cultures and languages comes in handy when dealing with other cultures.
- Jimmy the Robot (The Aquabats / The Aquabats! Super Show!) – An android with advanced skills and knowledge in numerous areas of science and technology.
- Professor Ko (Q18 Quantum Dice: Allegory of the Quantum) – A quantum scientist.
- Dr. Raj Koothrappali (The Big Bang Theory) – An astrophysicist at Caltech.
- Geordi La Forge (Star Trek: The Next Generation) – A chief engineering officer of the Enterprise-D.
- Li Wei (Q18 Quantum Dice: Allegory of the Quantum) – The engineer of the quantum starlight programming.
- Lu Chia-chia (Q18 Quantum Dice: Allegory of the Quantum) – A rational engineer.
- Angus "Mac" MacGyver (MacGyver) – A secret agent who fights the forces of evil using his scientific and engineering knowledge.
- Quinn Mallory (Sliders) – A graduate student who invents the transdimensional gateway.
- Lewis McCartney (H_{2}O: Just Add Water)
- Leonard McCoy (Star Trek: The Original Series) – The chief medical officer of the Enterprise.
- Dr. Rodney McKay (Stargate) – A brilliant but whiny astrophysicist who saves the lost city of Atlantis on a regular basis.
- Miles O'Brien (Star Trek: Deep Space Nine) – The chief operations officer and engineer on Deep Space Nine.
- Walter O'Brien (Scorpion) – 197 IQ genius, hacker, and leader of team Scorpion.
- Dr. Juliet Parrish (V) – A scientist who becomes the principal leader of the resistance against the genocidal alien Visitors.
- Quinn Pensky (Zoey 101) – A 13-year-old aspiring scientist, best known for her "Quinventions" that help out her friends.
- Phlox (Star Trek: Enterprise) – The chief medical officer on the Enterprise-NX01.
- Professor Bernard Quatermass
- Professor John Robinson (Lost in Space (1965)) – Astrophysicist.
- Dr. Maureen Robinson (Lost in Space (1965)) – Biochemist.
- Maureen Robinson (Lost in Space (2018)) – Aerospace engineer.
- Dr. Bernadette Rostenkowski-Wolowitz (The Big Bang Theory) – A microbiologist for a pharmaceutical company.
- Hoshi Sato (Star Trek: Enterprise) – A communication officer of the Enterprise-NX01 and inventor of the universal translator.
- Abby Sciuto (NCIS) – A forensic scientist for the Naval Criminal Investigative Service.
- Montgomery "Scotty" Scott (Star Trek: The Original Series) – The chief engineer of the Enterprise, often described as a miracle worker.
- Dr. Richard Seaton (Skylark) – A super-scientist.
- Seven of Nine (Star Trek: Voyager) – A Borg drone with no official rank or post, but was used as an acting science officer on Voyager due to her access to advanced Borg knowledge.
- Dr. River Song (Doctor Who) – An archeologist, adventurer, and companion of the Doctor.
- Noonien Soong (Star Trek: The Next Generation) – An inventor of the positronic brain, which makes intelligent androids possible.
- Dr. Tolian Soran (Star Trek Generations) – An El-Aurian scientist desperate to return to the Nexus.
- Spock (Star Trek: The Original Series) – A science officer and second-in-command of the Enterprise.
- Dr. Mohinder Suresh (Heroes) – An Indian professor of genetics and parapsychology.
- B'Elanna Torres (Star Trek: Voyager) – The chief engineer of Voyager.
- T'Pol (Star Trek: Enterprise) – The second-in-command of the Enterprise-NX01, though the crew also relies on her as an acting science officer.
- Charles "Trip" Tucker III (Star Trek: Enterprise) – The chief engineer of the Enterprise-NX01.
- Nora Wakeman (My Life as a Teenage Robot) – A scientist and the creator of XJ-9 / Jenny Wakeman.
- Dr. Rudy Wells (The Six Million Dollar Man and The Bionic Woman) – A cyberneticist.
- Howard Wolowitz (The Big Bang Theory) – A aerospace engineer at Caltech.

== In animated television ==
- Alador Blight (The Owl House) – A workaholic engineer who uses a mixture of witchcraft and technology to build weapons and mechanical bodyguards.
- Brain from Pinky and the Brain (1993–1998) and (2020–2023)
- Princess Bubblegum (Adventure Time) – A princess who created the citizens of Candy Kingdom.
- Minerva Campbell (Adventure Time) – Finn's biological mother.
- Sandy Cheeks (SpongeBob SquarePants) – An anthropomorphic squirrel who is one of SpongeBob's best friends.
- Aviva Corcovado (Wild Kratts) – An engineer and inventor who works with the Kratt brothers. Among other inventions, she created the Creature Power Suits, which mimic the abilities of animals.
- Dexter (Dexter's Laboratory) – A child genius who invents world-saving inventions in his secret laboratory.
- Professor Hubert Farnsworth (Futurama) – The creator of an atomic monster, various inventions, and the engines that allow space travel.
- Professor Frink (The Simpsons) – Springfield's greatest scientific and engineering mind.
- Newton Gimmick (The Adventures of Teddy Ruxpin) – An absent-minded inventor whose inventions do not always work, but always come through in the end.
- Dr. Gross (Adventure Time) – A cyborg.
- Prince Gumball (Adventure Time) – A gender-swapped version of Princess Bubblegum.
- Gadget Hackwrench (Chip 'n Dale Rescue Rangers) – A mouse tinkerer/scientist.
- Franz Hopper (Code Lyoko) – A genius in quantum physics and computer programming responsible for the creation of the virtual reality Lyoko, malevolent A.I. XANA, and the hardware that supports both.
- Dr. Fritz Huhnmorder (Robot Chicken) – A scientist who revives a road-killed chicken with cybernetic technology and forces the chicken to watch stop motion comedy sketches.
- Kowalski (The Penguins of Madagascar) – The team's scientist and inventor.
- Doctor Krieger (Archer) – The head of the ISIS applied research department.
- Lisa Loud (The Loud House) – A gifted inventor of the Loud family.
- Randy Marsh (South Park) – A former geologist who previously worked for the United States Geological Survey.
- Professor Membrane (Invader Zim) – A super-scientist, known as "the man without whom this world falls into chaos, and the inventor of Super Toast".
- Mametchi (Tamagotchi)
- Jimmy Neutron (The Adventures of Jimmy Neutron, Boy Genius) – A self-proclaimed boy genius.
- Perceptor (Transformers) – An Autobot scientist.
- Peridot (Steven Universe) – A Gem scientist and member of the Crystal Gems.
- Ford Pines (Gravity Falls) – Author of the three journals, who earned his Ph.D. in Backupsmore University.
- Professor Porter (The Legend of Tarzan)
- Doctor Prince (Adventure Time) – A gender-swapped version of Doctor Princess.
- Doctor Princess (Adventure Time) – A medical official in Ooo.
- Dr. Benton Quest (Jonny Quest)
- Ratchet (Transformers) – A skilled Autobot medic; in the G1 Comics, he sacrifices himself to kill Megatron.
- Rick Sanchez (Rick and Morty) – A sociopathic alcoholic and the smartest man of the universe, who travels through various dimensions with his grandson Morty.
- Asami Sato (The Legend of Korra) – A trained engineer, skilled pilot and driver, and competent unarmed combatant; partner of Avatar Korra and CEO of Future Industries.
- Sokka (Avatar: The Last Airbender) – A self-taught engineer, inventor, and military strategist.
- Twilight Sparkle (My Little Pony: Friendship Is Magic)
- Susan and Mary Test (Johnny Test) – Johnny's twin sisters, who develop gadgets and chemicals and often test them on Johnny.
- Professor Utonium (The Powerpuff Girls) – A scientist who created the Powerpuff Girls, serving as their father figure.
- Varian (Rapunzel's Tangled Adventure)
- Dr. Thaddeus "Rusty" Venture (The Venture Bros.) – A self-proclaimed super-scientist who re-purposes his father Jonas Venture's old inventions.
- Dr. Nuvo Vindi (Star Wars: The Clone Wars)
- Wheeljack (Transformers) – Autobot engineer and inventor.
- Hange Zoe (Attack on Titan) – A scientist in charge of studying Titans and inventing new weapons for the Survey Corps.
- Zoidberg (Futurama) – A lobster-like alien doctor who works at Planet Express.

== In animated films ==
- "9 Scientist" (9 (2009)) – An unnamed scientist who creates nine sentient rag dolls and imparts portions of his soul unto each of them before he dies.
- Dr. Cockroach (Monsters vs. Aliens) – A brilliant engineer with the head, body and abilities of a cockroach.
- Gru (Despicable Me) – A former criminal genius who redeems himself.
- Jumba Jookiba (Lilo & Stitch) – An alien genius who created Stitch and the other experiments.
- Mac (Chicken Run) – A Scottish chicken scientist, who helps the chickens escape the farm using aerodynamics, anatomy, and mechanics.
- Megamind (Megamind) – An alien genius who later redeems himself and becomes a hero.
- Dr. Nefario (Despicable Me) – Gru's scientist ally.
- Victor "Vector" Perkins (Despicable Me)
- Flint Lockwood (Cloudy with a Chance of Meatballs)

== In comics and graphic novels ==
=== DC Comics ===
- Barry Allen / Flash – A police scientist and superhero.
- Brainiac 5 – A Coluan member of the Legion of Super-Heroes who possesses an advanced twelfth-level intellect.
- Jay Garrick / Flash – A research scientist who is the first Flash and a founding member of the Justice Society of America
- Carter Hall / Hawkman – An archaeologist who has been reborn many times, using his knowledge acquired through centuries in his anthropological studies.
- Ted Knight / Starman – An astronomer, expert scientist, and superhero.
- Mar Londo – A Zuunian scientist who experimented with the element zuunium and created robots to mine it. He gave his son, Brin Londo, superpowers using zuunium and died shortly afterward.
- Will Magnus – The creator of the Metal Men, a team of advanced artificially-intelligent robots.
- Jon Osterman / Doctor Manhattan – A nuclear physicist transformed by an accident into a godlike super-being. While publicized as a superhero, Manhattan functions as the ultimate weapon for the United States military and works as one of their sanctioned superheroes.
- Ray Palmer / Atom – A physics professor at Ivy University; he is able to shrink his body to varying degrees, including sub-atomic level.
- Doctor Poison – A scientist and enemy of Wonder Woman who specializes in chemistry and poisons.
- Alan Scott – An engineer who is among the first human Green Lanterns.
- Angela Spica / Engineer
- Martin Stein – A Nobel Prize-winning nuclear physicist and professor, Stein became one half of the hero Firestorm after being caught in a nuclear explosion.
- Tom Strong – A science hero.
- Bruce Wayne / Batman – Reputedly the world's greatest detective, Batman possesses unsurpassed scientific knowledge and forensic and memory skills.

=== Marvel Comics ===
- Dr. Bruce Banner / Hulk – A scientist who developed a gamma bomb for the US government. An accident at the site of a test led to Banner becoming the Hulk; afterwards, he looked for scientific ways to rid himself of the transformation.
- Forge – A mutant engineering genius.
- Dr. Henry (Hank) Philip McCoy / Beast – A world-renowned biochemist and mutant superhero and member of the X-Men.
- Peter Parker / Spider-Man – A superhero with great knowledge of advanced sciences and teacher at Empire State University, the high school he formerly attended. His father Richard has also been portrayed as a scientist and geneticist in the Ultimate Marvel comics, as well as the films The Amazing Spider-Man and its sequel.
- Reed Richards / Mister Fantastic (Fantastic Four) – A scientist and inventor, regarded as one of the most intelligent people on Earth, and leader of the Fantastic Four.
- Ted Sallis – A biochemist who was transformed into the Man-Thing following a failed attempt to recreate the serum that created Captain America. Although struggling with his personal ethics regarding women and girls, he abandoned Operation Sulfer on moral grounds and elected to remain as Man-Thing rather than allow innocents to be killed by the demon Thog.
- Tony Stark / Iron Man – An industrialist and mechanical engineer of incredible ingenuity and inventive genius, whose technology he uses to fight crime also keeps him alive.
- Victor and Janet Stein – Founding members of the Pride and the parents of Chase Stein.
- Professor Charles Francis Xavier / Professor X – The founder, mentor, and occasional leader of the X-Men.
- Dr. Henry "Hank" Pym – A biochemist, who discovers an unusual set of subatomic particles he names Pym Particles. Entrapping the particles within two separate serums, he creates a size-altering formula and a reversal formula, testing them on himself and becoming the original Ant-Man.
- Dr. Cylo (Star Wars: Darth Vader) – A scientist specializing in cybernetics who develops technologies combining organic life with mechanical augmentation, including cybernetically enhanced beings and a system for transferring his personality between bodies.

=== Other comics ===
- Adhemar (The Adventures of Nero) – A child prodigy and professor in many different disciplines, as well as a Nobel Prize laureate and teacher at the universities of Oxford and Cambridge,
- Professor Barabas (Suske en Wiske) – An expert in many inventions, including time travel,
- Brainstorm (The Transformers: More than Meets the Eye) – A scientific genius who invented time travel in order to save his best friend's husband, the consequences of which technically began the Autobot-Decepticon civil war.
- Professor Cuthbert Calculus (The Adventures of Tintin) – A brilliant, if distracted, scientist; responsible for developing the first one-person submarine, the first ultrasonic destruction device, and the first white rose, as well as the leader of the first crewed lunar mission.
- Dilbert – A star engineer of the comic strip series Dilbert.
- Dilton Doiley (Archie Comics) – A teenage inventor and scientific genius,
- Donatello (Teenage Mutant Ninja Turtles) – The most intelligent of the four Turtles, who builds advanced devices.
- Dr. Frankenollie ("Runaway Brain")
- Gyro Gearloose (Donald Duck universe)
- Jeremias Gobelijn (Jommeke) – The self-declared "professor in everything".
- Agatha Heterodyne (Airship Entertainment and Girl Genius) – An heiress to the political background and scientific understanding of the Heterodyne family.
- Professor Kumulus (Piet Pienter en Bert Bibber)
- Fran Madaraki (Franken Fran) – An artificial human created by a biologist; like her creator, she possesses immense medical skills.
- Helen B. Narbon (Narbonic) – A mad geneticist with an odd fascination with gerbils.
- Professor Philip Mortimer (Blake and Mortimer) – The protagonist, a physicist and gentleman scholar.
- Professor Snuffel (Piet Pienter en Bert Bibber)
- Tilly Tailor – A teen wearable technology engineer and leader of the SEWing Circle (Style Engineers Worldwide)
- Ludwig Von Drake (Donald Duck universe) – A professor of science and psychology.
- Wally (Dilbert) – A lazy and disillusioned engineer.
- Dr. Hans Zarkov (Flash Gordon)

== In anime and manga ==
=== Individual scientist/engineers in anime and manga ===
- Jotaro Kujo (JoJo's Bizarre Adventure) – An oceanographer. While unrelated to his role in the various plot arcs he appears in, Jotaro earns a doctorate in oceanography sometime during the summer of 1999 in the series' original timeline, and dolphin and anchor motifs were added to his clothing to reflect his new occupation. He also earns the title of a marine biologist, studying starfishes specifically.
- Ishigami Senku (Dr Stone) - After humanity was wiped out due to a petrifying ray, he rebuild all of society using his scientific prowess.
- Leeron Littner (Gurren Lagann) – The mechanic for team dai-gurren, able to repair and make Gunmen, It is unknown how he knows how to do this, but he is exceptionally intelligent and naturally talented with machinery.
- Professor Brown (Cyborg 009)
- Bulma (Dragon Ball) – The creator of the Dragon Radar and a time machine, which allowed Trunks to travel back in time and avert the conquest of the world by evil androids.
- Heaven Canceller (A Certain Magical Index) – A doctor and medical scientist.
- Kiranin Colbock (Space Runaway Ideon) – A member of a science academy.
- Dr. Cinnamon (TwinBee) – A genius scientist who is the creator of TwinBee and WinBee.
- Caesar Clown (One Piece) – The former marine scientist and former partner of Doctor Vegapunk. He created mass destruction weapons and human experimentation, but was fired and arrested due to his unethical research methods.
- The Doctor (Hellsing) – The lead scientist of Millennium, who created the Nazi vampires and the catboy Schrödinger.
- Professor Kozo Fuyutsuki (Neon Genesis Evangelion) – The right-hand man to Supreme Commander Gendo Ikari and second in command of Nerv.
- Szayelaporro Grantz (Bleach) – An Arrancar scientist.
- Doctor Hogback (One Piece) – The doctor of Gecko Moria's crew who modified dead bodies to create a zombie army with the help of his captain.
- Mototsugu Inukai (Corrector Yui) – A scientist and engineer who developed the virtual reality platform ComNet and the Correctors who fight to maintain it.
- Harumi Kiyama (A Certain Scientific Railgun) – The creator of the Level Upper.
- Ri Kohran (Sakura Wars)
- Lloyd Asplund (Code Geass) – A Britannian scientist who designed the Lancelot Knightmare Frame, a bipedal, humanoid superweapon entrusted to Japanese pilot Suzaku Kururugi.
- Makise Kurisu (Steins;Gate) – A neuroscientist who graduated from university at the age of 17, inspired by her father's work to write a thesis on time travel. She currently works as a researcher at the Viktor Chondria University in the United States.
- Dr. Emil Lang (Robotech) – He was responsible for much of the Earth-based Robotechnology; briefly seen in the original series, he played a much larger role in Robotech II: The Sentinels.
- Professor Ochanomizu – The surrogate father of Astro Boy.
- Manami Okuda (Assassination Classroom)
- Tochiro Oyama (Captain Harlock) – A designer on Harlock's spaceship Arcadia
- Dr. Tem Ray (Mobile Suit Gundam) – The father of Amuro Ray; led the design team that created the RX-78 Gundam.
- Dr. Aki Ross (Final Fantasy: The Spirits Within) – A biologist vowing to stop the aliens that plague the Earth.
- Shiro Sanada (Star Blazers) – The chief technician of the Space Battleship Yamato, called Sandor in Star Blazers.
- Professor Noriyasu Seta (Love Hina)
- Dr. Sid (Final Fantasy: The Spirits Within)
- Skuld (Oh My Goddess!) – A goddess who has the ability to build robots and machines from scrap material.
- James Ray Steam (Steamboy) – A boy genius who helps his father and grandfather save Victorian London from a greedy corporation's superweapons.
- Umataro Tenma (Astro Boy) – A genius engineer who built the titular Astro Boy as a replacement for his deceased son Tobio, only to end up rejecting him.
- Precia Testarossa (Magical Girl Lyrical Nanoha) – A scientist whose grief at her daughter's death drove her to clone said daughter and, later, to pursue the mythical land of Al-Hazard to resurrect her daughter for real.
- Washu (Tenchi Muyo!) – Scientist from the planet Jurai
- Wu Tomoki (JoJo's Bizarre Adventure) – An orthopedic surgeon and cosmetic dermatologist employed at the T.G. University Hospital, notable for his research of the Locacaca fruit.
- Doctor Vegapunk (One Piece) – The leading scientist in the employment of the Marines. His work includes discovering the secrets and uses of Seastone, the secrets of how Devil Fruit powers work, how to get an item to "eat" a Devil Fruit, and other futuristic inventions.
- Hanji Zoe (Attack on Titan) – The head scientist in the survey corps, who performs experiments on captured titans in hopes of finding a way to save humanity.

== In video games ==
=== Scientists in video games ===
- Dr. Alphys (Undertale) – A timid lizard monster and Asgore's royal scientist, who is the creator of the robot Mettaton and the Amalgamates. She has a crush on Undyne, captain of the Royal Guard.
- Dr. Andonuts (EarthBound) – The father of Jeff, one of the Chosen Four.
- Dr. Alex Mercer ([PROTOTYPE]) – The creator of the Blacklight virus.
- Rikako Asakura (Touhou Project) – Known as the "Scientist Searching for Dreams", she is one of the few people in Gensokyo to value using science over magic. Though occasionally using magic in order to enhance her science, she tries to refrain from using magic due to her natural distaste of it.
- Alfred Drevis (Mad Father) – The father of Aya Drevis and husband of Monika Drevis, working to kidnap poor children and turn them into dolls for the sake of "eternal beauty."
- Coco Bandicoot (Crash Bandicoot) – Crash Bandicoot's younger sister. who has a deep intelligence and a love of science. This is in opposition to her brother, an electronics engineer specializing in hacking, computer programming and machine building.
- William Birkin (Resident Evil 2) – A microbiologist working for the pharmaceutical enterprise Umbrella Corporation and creator of the G-virus. He was wounded and injected himself with the G-virus, mutating him into a monster.
- Dr. Bosconovitch (Tekken)
- Ciel (Mega Man Zero) – A young human scientist who awakens Zero in order to save the world.
- Lucrecia Crescent (Final Fantasy VII) – A Shinra scientist and lover of Vincent Valentine.
- Penny Crygor (WarioWare) – Dr. Crygor's granddaughter.
- Dr. Casper Darling (Control) – Head of paranatural research at the United States Federal Bureau of Control.
- Pieter Van Eckhardt (Tomb Raider: The Angel of Darkness)
- Dr. Gordon Freeman (Half-Life) – A theoretical physicist who fights against invading aliens, US Marines and Combine forces with a crowbar and other weapons, alongside doctors Isaac Kleiner, Eli Vance, Judith Mossman and Arne Magnusson.
- Professor E. Gadd (Super Mario series)
- Dr. Gast (Final Fantasy VII) – The former head of the Shinra Company's science department, who has a much stronger moral compass than his successor.
- Dr. W. D. Gaster (Undertale) – A former royal scientist who speaks in the Wingdings font.
- Nicoletta "Nico" Goldstein (Devil May Cry) – Creator of various robotic arms that the player can use when playing as Nero.
- Catherine Halsey (Halo) – The scientist of the Office of Naval Intelligence and creator of Cortana and the SPARTAN-II Program and Mjolnir Powered Assault Armor, as well as supervising the creation of the template for third-generation smart AI.
- Dr. Samuel Hayden (Doom) – Head of the UAC, physicist.
- Viktor Humphries (Slime Rancher)
- Kirin Jindosh (Dishonored 2) – Grand Inventor to Duke Luca Abele and founder of Jindosh Clockworks, which created the Clockwork Soldiers and Clockwork Sentinels.
- Cave Johnson (Portal 2) – The eccentric former owner of Aperture Science, and creator of the portal gun.
- Plague Knight (Shovel Knight) – A rogue member of the Order of No Quarter, who tries to harvest their Essence for the Ultimate Potion to win over someone's heart.
- Dr. Krieger (Far Cry) – A renowned scientist and creator/controller of the Trigens in the first Far Cry game
- Love Lab scientists (Rhythm Heaven) – A male and female scientist who pass ingredients to each other to make love potions to the rhythm of the music
- Dr. Light (Mega Man) – The creator of Mega Man, Roll, Proto Man, X, and various other robots.
- Kurisu Makise (Steins;Gate) – A Japanese neuroscientist who lives in the United States, who builds a machine that allows the user's memories to be converted into data.
- Mei (Overwatch) – A climatologist and one of the heroes in the games and comic series.
- Moira (Overwatch) – A geneticist and one of the playable heroes in the game.
- Daro'Xen vas Moreh (Mass Effect 2) – A Quarian admiral and scientist who believes that the geth, a synthetic race created by the quarians, who rebelled and drove their masters from their homeworld, should be controlled by the quarians once again. Admiral Xen also performed surgery on her childhood toys, much to the quarian squadmate Tali'Zorah's disgust.
- Dr. Otto Wolfgang Ort-Meyer (Hitman) – The creator of Agent 47 and other clone assassins.
- Tobias Planck (Pirate Galaxy) – Named after Max Planck, he is a theoretical physicist and field scientist with a parietal lobe 15% larger than average.
- Miles "Tails" Prower (Sonic the Hedgehog) – An anthropomorphic fox inventor and ally of Sonic.
- Mordin Solus (Mass Effect 2) – A Salarian biologist and tech specialist.
- Egon Stetmann (StarCraft II) – The creator of the Mecha Swarm, who is paranoid and prone to terrazine-induced hallucinations. He was once chief science adviser aboard the Hyperion.
- Dr. Yi Suchong (Bioshock) – A scientist in the city of Rapture, known for creating the Big Daddies, plasmids such as telekinesis and enrage, and helping to turn Jack into Frank Fontaine's "ace in the hole".
- Grimoire Valentine (Final Fantasy VII) – A Shinra scientist and Vincent Valentine's father.
- Wilhelm "Doktor" Voigt (Metal Gear Rising: Revengeance) – A robotics engineer working for Maverick Security Consulting, who assists the player throughout the game.
- Reed Wahl (BioShock 2) – The co-founder of Rapture Central Computing, and co-inventor of the Thinker, main antagonist of the Minerva's Den DLC.
- Albert Wesker (Resident Evil) – A microbiologist working for the pharmaceutical enterprise Umbrella and co-creator of the T-virus. He was killed in the first Resident Evil game by Tyrant T-002, a powerful biological weapon, but resurrected with super-human powers via the T-virus.
- Dr. Zed (Borderlands) – A "doctor".
- Red (Rainbow Friends (game) on Roblox) – The creator of the Rainbow Friends.
- Wilson P. Higgsbury (Don't Starve) – An amateur scientist who blew up the chemistry lab he was working in during university. After this, he was tricked into going to and having to survive in the game's setting, The Constant.
- Yi Sang (Limbus Company) Sinner #1 of Limbus Company, former researcher, discoverer of the "mirror worlds" (alternate realities) and inventor of "the mirror" (a window into them), he is often described as "The ideal researcher".
- Ema Skye (Apollo Justice: Ace Attorney Trilogy) – Forensic scientist and homicide detective.
- The Herta (Honkai Star Rail) – Member #83 of the Genius Society and owner of the Herta Space Station, a very talented scientist.
- Ruan Mei (Honkai Star Rail) – Member #81 of the Genius Society, an expert in biological science.

=== Engineers in video games ===
- Cid (Final Fantasy) – A recurring character throughout the series, often with the occupation of engineer.
- Isaac Clarke (Dead Space) – A space engineer tasked with investigating the U.S.G. Ishimura, and later fighting the Necromorphs.
- The Engineer (Deep Rock Galactic) – A dwarf engineer and employee of the Deep Rock Galactic corporation.
- The Engineer (Team Fortress 2) – One of nine playable classes who is capable of building sentry guns for area denial and other constructions that support allies.
- Otacon (Metal Gear) – A designer of Metal Gear REX and ally of Solid Snake.
- Amanda Ripley (Alien: Isolation) – An engineer who investigates the disappearance of her mother Ellen Ripley on the space station Sevastopol.
- Rory Swann (StarCraft II) – A New Yorker and engineer who runs the mothership of Jim Raynor.
- Torbjörn (Overwatch) – A Swedish engineer and weapons designer who is a founding member of Overwatch.
- Shion Uzuki (Xenosaga) – A "geeky engineer" and "unlikely heroine" who creates KOS-MOS, an "armored gynoid".

== Mad scientists ==
This section lists all the mad scientists in different media appearances:

=== Mad scientists and evil geniuses in literature ===
- Otto Hantzen (Les Mystères de Demain) – A German mad scientist, who, along with female accomplice Hindu mystic Yogha, battles his former colleague Oronius from Mount Everest to Atlantis.
- Victor Frankenstein (Frankenstein) – A scientist who stole body parts from graves and used them to create his monster.
- Dr. Henry Jekyll (Strange Case of Dr Jekyll and Mr Hyde) – A scientist who searches for alteration of the human body and to separate the evil from the good, which led to him developing the evil form of Edward Hyde.
- Mad scientists of Stanisław Lem, quite a few mad geniuses, many of whom strove to "inflict social panacea on entire populations", a part of Lem's philosophical analysis of social engineering.
- Dr. Moreau (The Island of Doctor Moreau) – A vivisectionist who has fled a scandal to live on a remote island in the Pacific to pursue his research of perfecting his Beast Folk.
- Professor Moriarty – The evil genius antagonist of Sherlock Holmes.
- Dr. Julius No (Dr. No)

=== Mad scientists in live-action films ===
- Mr. Barron (Miss Peregrine's Home for Peculiar Children)
- Dr. Simon Barsinister (Underdog) – An adaption of the cartoon character, who was scarred and crippled in an accident.
- Nathan Bateman (Ex Machina)
- Dr. René Emile Belloq (Raiders of the Lost Ark) – An adventuring archeologist and antagonist for Indiana Jones in targeting the Ark of the Covenant.
- Dr. Ralph Benson (The Mad Doctor of Market Street)
- Professor Gerard Beckert (Frostbite) – A mad geneticist and Nazi World War II veteran who creates genetically enhanced vampires out of the unsuspecting youth of a Norrland-town near the Arctic Circle.
- Dr. Theodore Bohmer (The Ghost of Frankenstein)
- Dr. Paul Carruthers (The Devil Bat)
- Dr. Phillip Channard (Hellbound: Hellraiser II)
- Conal Cochran (Halloween III: Season of the Witch) – He plans to resurrect macabre aspects of the Gaelic festival Samhain, which he connects to witchcraft.
- Dr. Franz Edelmann (House of Dracula) – An honorable doctor who was transfused with the blood of Count Dracula, causing him to go insane and become a murderer.
- Dr. Evil (Austin Powers)
- Casanova Frankenstein (Mystery Men) – A criminal mastermind in Champion City.
- Frederick Frankenstein (Young Frankenstein) – The grandson of Victor Frankenstein, who at first is embarrassed by his grandfather's deeds and insists that his name is pronounced "Fronkensteen," but eventually creates his own monster.
- Henry Frankenstein (Frankenstein) – The film's version of Victor Frankenstein.
- Dr. Frank N. Furter (The Rocky Horror Picture Show)
- Dr. Gogol (Mad Love)
- Dr. Lawrence Gordon (Saw) – An uncaring surgeon until he survived a "test" orchestrated by the Jigsaw Killer. After the experience changed his viewpoint on life, Gordon became Jigsaw's apprentice and began applying his medical skills to Jigsaw's traps. Following Jigsaw's death, Gordon became his successor.
- Dr. Josef Heiter (The Human Centipede (First Sequence)) – A Josef Mengele-esque surgeon known for his surgical atrocity, which he calls the "Human Centipede".
- Dr. Hoenneger (The Wolfman) – A German doctor who worked at an insane asylum and used medical torture to "treat" Lawrence Talbot's lycanthropy.
- Dr. Horrible (Dr. Horrible's Sing-Along Blog)
- Dr. Ashley Kafka (The Amazing Spider-Man 2) – A German doctor who experiments on the patients of the Ravencroft Institute.
- John Kramer (Saw) – A former civil engineer who spends the last months of his life testing people's will to live by placing them in deadly traps.
- Dr. Nick Laslowicz (The Centrifuge Brain Project)
- Dr. Mannering (Frankenstein Meets the Wolf Man)
- Dr. Wolfe MacFarlane (The Body Snatcher)
- Dr. Cal Meacham (This Island Earth) – An earth scientist who is kidnapped to solve the problem of defending the planet Metaluna.
- Dr. Harold Medford (Them!) – He led the team that wiped out the giant ants.
- Dr. Gustav Niemann (House of Frankenstein) – A mad doctor who escaped prison for revenge, took over a horror carnival exhibit that included Count Dracula and later encountered Frankenstein's monster and the Wolf Man.
- Philo (UHF)
- Doctor Septimus Pretorius (Bride of Frankenstein) – A mad doctor and Henry Frankenstein's teacher who followed in Henry Frankenstein's footsteps in creating living beings. He blackmailed Frankenstein into helping him to create a female companion for Frankenstein's monster.
- Rotwang (Metropolis)
- Dr. Shinzo Mafune (Terror of Mechagodzilla) – A bitter oceanographer who had previously been ridiculed for his obsessive research into the brain patterns of sea creatures. He allies with the invading Black Hole Planet 3 Aliens, unleashing the mind-controlled kaiju Titanosaurus – whom he had personally discovered – to assist their newly rebuilt Mechagodzilla.
- Dr. Carl Stoner (Sssssss) – A delusional scientist attempting to create a method of transforming humans into snakes.
- Dr. Strangelove (Dr. Strangelove) – A former Nazi scientist who was the scientific advisor to the President of the United States during the brink of apocalypse.
- Dr. Alexander Thorkel (Dr. Cyclops)
- Dr. Jane Tiptree (Carnosaur) – A mad scientist who plans to recreate dinosaurs and destroy humanity.
- Dr. Richard Vollin (The Raven)
- Dr. Eric Vornoff (Bride of the Monster)
- Dr. Herbert West (Re-Animator)
- Peter Weyland (Prometheus)
- Dr. Henry Wu (Jurassic Park) – The chief geneticist at Jurassic Park and head of the team that resurrected dinosaurs via cloning.
- Dr. XXX (The Mad Doctor)

=== Mad scientists in live-action television ===
- Dr. Arthur Arden / Hans Grüper (American Horror Story: Asylum)
- Walter Bishop (Fringe) – A scientist who was responsible for opening a doorway into another universe to save an alternate version of his son Peter from dying. His actions resulted in the gradual breakdown of both universes and inadvertently started a war between them.
- Martin Brenner (Stranger Things) – He was the scientist who experimented on Eleven.
- Davros (Doctor Who) – The creator of the Daleks.
- Dr. Laurence Erhardt (Mystery Science Theater 3000)
- Dr. Clayton Forrester (Mystery Science Theater 3000)
- TV's Frank (Mystery Science Theater 3000)
- Kinga Forrester (Mystery Science Theater 3000)
- Pearl Forrester (Mystery Science Theater 3000)
- Dr. Benjamin Jeffcoat (My Secret Identity)
- Dr. Loveless (The Wild Wild West)
- The Master (Doctor Who) – A renegade alien who seeks universal conquest.
- Masahiko Minami (Kamen Rider 555)
- Isaac Night (Wednesday (TV series))
- Dr. Jonathan Reiss (Lara Croft Tomb Raider: The Cradle of Life) – A disease specialist who sought to obtain Pandora's box.
- Dr. Wilhelm Rolf (Days of Our Lives)
- Dr. Shrinker (Doctor Shrinker)
- Dr. Cornelius Quease (Ninja Turtles: The Next Mutation)
- Dr. Cassandra Spellcraft (Batman)
- Cabala (Batman)
- King Tut / Professor William McElroy (Batman)

=== Mad scientists in animated television ===
- Hugo A-Go-Go (Batfink) – Batfink's most recurring enemy.
- Dr. Arkeville (The Transformers) – A self-proclaimed evil genius who allies himself with the Decepticons.
- Lord Boxman (OK K.O.! Let's Be Heroes) – An evil robotics engineer and CEO of Boxmore.
- Professor Bug (The Backyardigans) – A pseudo-steampunk mad scientist portrayed by Pablo, who bugs all the robots in Mega City in the episode "Robot Rampage".
- Professor Finbarr Calamitous (The Adventures of Jimmy Neutron, Boy Genius) – A recurring enemy of Jimmy Neutron.
- Dr. Cerebral (Atomic Betty) – A mad alien scientist, consisting of a brain with a face floating within a glass tank upon a mechanical body, who seeks to control the universe and wipe out all organic life out of a belief that mechanical beings are more efficient.
- Dr. Claw (Inspector Gadget) – The leader of MAD.
- Dr. Heinz Doofenshmirtz (Phineas and Ferb) – A mad scientist whose goal is to take over the Tri-State Area.
- Dr. Drakken (Kim Possible) – A blue-skinned mad scientist determined to take over the world in order to prove his genius.
- Miles Dredd (Max Steel) – The main antagonist of Max Steel.
- Dr Jhatka (Motu Patlu) - Main inventor of the show.
- Princess Entrapta (She-Ra: Princess of Power and She-Ra and the Princesses of Power) – The Evil Horde's robotics engineer and inventor.
- Dr. Flug (Villainous) – An intelligent and inventive mad scientist who creates the gadgets and machines that Black Hat attempts to sell.
- Mojo Jojo (The Powerpuff Girls) – A mad scientist chimpanzee that plots to take over the world and destroy the Powerpuff Girls. He was also Professor Utonium's former pet and partially responsible for the creation of the Powerpuff Girls.
- Van Kleiss (Generator Rex) – A British scientist who can manipulate the earth.
- Dr. Lullah (StuGo) – She was responsible for turning animals into humanoid mutants, creating other lifeforms, and conducting experiments, as well as passing her island off as a summer camp that six children attend.
- Mandark (Dexter's Laboratory) – Dexter's rival, an evil genius who wants to destroy Dexter's laboratory and take over the world.
- Mane-iac (My Little Pony: Friendship Is Magic) – A mad scientist in chemical engineering, specializing in the production of detergents.
- Marvin the Martian (Looney Tunes) – A would-be planet conqueror.
- Megatron (Transformers) – The leader of the Decepticons.
- Dr. Alphonse Mephesto (South Park) – A mad scientist who specializes in genetic engineering and creates strange creatures with his talents. He also performs experiments ranging from simple DNA tests to creating a genetic clone of Stan Marsh for his son's science project.
- Doctor Mindbender (G.I. Joe: Renegades) – A mad young genius in charge of Cobra's secret Bio-Viper project.
- Dr. Namba (Pokémon) – An evil scientist who works for Team Rocket, where he mostly oversees Cassidy and Butch.
- Plankton (SpongeBob SquarePants) – A copepod evil genius who specializes in building robotic inventions, including his sidekick Karen.
- Vlad Plasmius (Danny Phantom) – A half-ghost evil inventor.
- Dr. Cinnamon J Scudworth (Clone High) – A mad scientist who created clones of historic figures, employed by The Secret Board of Shadowy Figures.
- Dr. Anton Sevarius (Gargoyles) – A mad scientist and geneticist involved in several projects in the Gargoyles storyline. His most notable act is the creation of Talon and the Mutates.
- Jack Spicer (Xiaolin Showdown) – A self-proclaimed evil boy genius.
- Doctor Two-Brains (WordGirl) – A scientist who accidentally fused a mouse brain with his own, giving him an evil split personality.
- Professor Venomous (OK K.O.! Let's Be Heroes) – An international terrorist and evil inventor.
- Dr. Weird (Aqua Teen Hunger Force) – The smartest, maddest, and scientistest scientist in the universe, whose experiments often cause problems for the Aqua Teens.

=== Mad scientists in animated films ===
- Buddy Pine / Syndrome (The Incredibles) – Mr. Incredible's fan/aspiring sidekick-turned-supervillain, who uses his scientific prowess to give himself enhanced abilities.
- Dr. Finkelstein (The Nightmare Before Christmas)
- Dr. Nefario (Despicable Me) – Gru's scientist ally.
- Victor "Vector" Perkins (Despicable Me)

=== Mad scientists in anime and manga ===
- Naoko Akagi (Neon Genesis Evangelion)
- Ritsuko Akagi (Neon Genesis Evangelion) – The daughter of Naoko Akagi.
- Dr. Hiroshi Agasa (Case Closed) – An absent-minded professor who invents several devices to aid Jimmy Kudo.
- Bondrewd (Made in Abyss) – A White Whistle known as "Bondrewd the Novel", who is in charge of Idofront, the Cave Riders' forward Operating Base in the fifth layer. He was responsible for several unethical experiments on children, including the one which transformed Nanachi and Mitty into Hollows.
- Dr. Hell (Mazinger Z) – A mad scientist who is obsessed with taking over the world with his army of robotic monsters known as Mechanical Beast or Kikaiju.
- Senku Ishigami (Dr. Stone) – A genius with vast scientific knowledge, who is able to invent various kinds of tools and gadgets quickly and efficiently. As a child, he designed and built a functioning miniature rocket ship. Senkuu also possesses an analytical mind, being able to correctly discern the situation he is in.
- Mayuri Kurotsuchi (Bleach) – A sadistic and cruel shinigami who uses his position as the leader of the Soul Society's Shinigami Research and Development Institute to conduct experiments.
- Desty Nova (Battle Angel Alita) – A wicked genius whose work is fueled by philosophy, who is highly skilled at nanotechnology.
- Rintaro Okabe (Steins;Gate) – An eccentric yet kind-hearted inventor who embraces the typical image of a mad scientist. His experiments lead to the invention of time travel.
- Orochimaru (Naruto) – A shinobi obsessed with immortality and obtaining knowledge of all jutsu. He conducted many illegal and unethical experiments that resulted in him becoming a wanted criminal.
- Franken Stein (Soul Eater)
- Kaolla Su (Love Hina) – An exchange student and princess of the island of Molmol. She frequently invents dangerous devices and wants to turn her kingdom into a technological powerhouse that will conquer Japan.
- Professor Souichi Tomoe (Sailor Moon) – The father of Hotaru Tomoe and the leader of Death Busters, who was once a world-renowned scientist in the field of genetic engineering. After being forced out of the scientific community for his unethical experiments, he sold his findings to companies and bought the Sankakusu District to continue his research to create "Super Beings". He vesselized one of the Daimon eggs, Germatoid, to become a human-Daimon hybrid, selling his soul to Master Pharaoh 90 and willfully discarding his humanity. After becoming a hybrid, he creates various Daimons while working to perfect the stability of Daimon/human hybrids.
- Daruma Ujiko (My Hero Academia) – A mad scientist associated with the series' main antagonists, the League of Villains.
- Dr. Xeno Houston Wingfield (Dr. Stone) - Originally a NASA scientist, Xeno became the leader of the American Colony, before eventually joining the Kingdom of Science. Before the petrification, he mentored Senku, helping him to be a better scientist.
- Kabuto Yakushi (Naruto) – Orochimaru's assistant who takes part in many of his master's illegal experiments in addition to conducting his own, which include raising the dead.
- Dr. Z (Dinosaur King) – The leader of the Alpha Gang who wanted to use the Dinosaur Cards to rule the world.

=== Mad scientists in comics ===
==== Mad scientists in DC Comics ====
- Doctor Death – The first supervillain Batman ever faces, a chemist and producer of biological weapons.
- Dollmaker – A serial killer and insane surgeon who makes dolls out of human flesh.
- Gorilla Grodd
- Professor Ivo – A supervillain and creator of Amazo, who is obsessed with immortality.
- Lex Luthor – A scientific genius who is the nemesis of Superman.
- Man-Bat
- Mr. Freeze
- Orca
- Doctor Poison – An enemy of Wonder Woman and a mad scientist, who specializes in chemistry and poisons.
- Poison Ivy – A supervillain scientist with an affinity towards plant life.
- Doctor Sivana – The world's wickedest scientist and archenemy of Captain Marvel.
- Hugo Strange – A mad scientist and enemy of Batman who deduced his secret identity.
- T. O. Morrow
- Ultra-Humanite

==== Mad scientists in Marvel Comics ====
- Curt Connors – A college professor and expert on reptiles, who created a formula to regrow his missing arm, but ended up turning himself into the Lizard.
- Doctor Doom – An evil scientist, engineer, genius, and conqueror. Like Mister Fantastic, he is regarded as one of the most intelligent people on Earth.
- Doctor Octopus – A narcissistic roboticist and nuclear physicist who is an enemy of Spider-Man.
- High Evolutionary – A British scientist who specializes in mutating animals into anthropomorphic forms.
- Jackal – A college professor who has a vendetta against Spider-Man due to the death of his girlfriend Gwen Stacy, whom he secretly loved. He creates multiple clones of the Spider-Man as well as a clone of Gwen to attack and torment him, eventually turning himself into a jackal-like beast.
- Leader – An enemy of the Hulk who was mutated by gamma radiation and possesses superhuman intelligence.
- Mister Sinister – An enemy of the X-Men who specializes in genetic engineering.
- Morbius – A scientist whose experiment with vampire bat DNA turned him into a pseudo-vampire.
- Norman Osborn – A billionaire CEO of Oscorp and Spider-Man's nemesis, who is sometimes portrayed as a scientist with brilliant intellect. He crafts a Halloween-themed costume called the Green Goblin while having developed a personality associated with it.
- Bolivar Trask – A scientist who created the Sentinels, a series of mutant-hunting robots.
- Baron Zemo – A Nazi and archenemy of Captain America.
- Arnim Zola – A former Nazi scientist who escaped death by transferring his consciousness into a mechanical body. In the present day, he is a member of the Hydra terrorist organization.
- Mad Thinker – Creator of the Awesome Android and frequent enemy of the Fantastic Four.
- Count Nefaria – Ionic aristocrat, a head of the Maggia, and enemy of the Avengers.
- Graviton – Master of gravity and foe to the Avengers.

==== Mad scientists in other comics ====
- Dr. Jonathan Septimus (Blake and Mortimer) – A mad scientist vengeful due to perceived slights by his colleagues, who appears in The Yellow "M" and The Septimus Wave.
- Joachim Sickbock (Tom Poes) – A mad scientist who often proves to be a threat to the protagonists.
- Baxter Stockman (Teenage Mutant Ninja Turtles) – A mad scientist and archenemy of the Teenage Mutant Ninja Turtles. Other media adaptions had him working for Shredder and the Foot Clan.
- Othar Tryggvassen (Girl Genius) – A powerful "spark", or mad scientist, bent on destroying all sparks, including himself.

=== Mad scientists in video games ===
- Doctor Nitrus Brio (Crash Bandicoot) – A timid and meek scientist who assisted Doctor Neo Cortex in the first game, often using beakers of chemicals.
- Doctor Neo Cortex (Crash Bandicoot) – An evil doctor who is the creator and archenemy of the franchise's titular hero Crash Bandicoot and has an oversized head. He seeks to conquer the world using Power Crystals.
- Dr. Crygor (WarioWare)
- Dr. Daniel Dickens (Angels of Death) – The main character's therapist.
- Victor Donovan (Dead or Alive) – The main antagonist of the Dead or Alive series.
- Dr. "Mundo" Edmundo (League of Legends) – A sociopath medical doctor who specializes in the study of the pain response and how to inflict pain. His experiments have caused him to take on a monstrous form and a deceptively dimwitted speech pattern.
- Dr. Ivo "Eggman" Robotnik (Sonic the Hedgehog) – A mad scientist and archenemy of Sonic the Hedgehog, who specializes in robotics and other fields of engineering and invents various aircraft, robots and vehicles, imprisoning animals inside of working robotic shells and experimenting with types of mutations. He aims to capture the Chaos Emeralds.
- Doctor N. Gin (Crash Bandicoot) – A masochistic scientist who assists Neo Cortex.
- GLaDOS/Caroline (Portal) – The main antagonist of the Portal franchise. She was Cave Johnson's assistant before taking over the facility.
- Professor Hojo (Final Fantasy VII) – The head of Shinra's science department. He is a sociopathic, amoral bioengineer whose experiments drive the game's plot forward, having a role in the backstories of Cloud Strife, Zack Fair, Vincent Valentine, and Sephiroth.
- Alexandria Hypatia (Dishonored 2) – The chief alchemist at the Addermire Institute who gains a separate serial killer personality after an experiment goes wrong.
- Elijah Kamski (Detroit: Become Human)
- Professor Von Kriplespac (Conker's Bad Fur Day)
- Dr. M (Sly Cooper) – A mandrill who was the brains of Sly's father's gang. Feeling that he was being held back, he set up a fortress on Kaine Island to break into the Cooper Vault and claim the wealth for himself.
- The Medic (Team Fortress 2) – One of nine playable classes, who rejects the Hippocratic Oath. He is able to heal other characters and temporarily make them invincible using his Medigun. He previously had a medical licence, but lost it due to misplacing a patient's skeleton.
- Dr. Nefarious (Ratchet & Clank) – A recurring adversary to Ratchet and Clank and Captain Qwark.
- Rintarō Okabe / Kyōma Hōōin (Steins;Gate) – A self-proclaimed mad scientist in his Kyōma Hōōin persona, taken from a television show he watched as a child.
- General Wilhelm "Deathshead" Strasse (Wolfenstein) – The major antagonist of the series, who leads the Nazis' research projects.
- Draedon (Calamity Mod) – An amoral robot with feats such as creating war machines, infesting a jungle's fauna with nanomachines to act as a plague, and working with one of the main characters, Yharim, in his Crusades. Also known as an engineer, and he has created technology far above the current societies' level.
- Wagstaff (Don't Starve) – Responsible for a large part of the sequel's plot, Wagstaff is a scientist who is primarily focused with researching the unique world in the game (The Constant) and potential applications for it, taking advantage of the local wildlife and survivors present to further his goals.
- Agnes Tachyon (Umamusume: Pretty Derby) – An eccentric scientist based on the real-life racehorse of the same name obsessed with experimentation and research to enhance the capabilities of Umamusume. She regularly bothers her peers and the player trainer to participate in her experiments as her "guinea pig", with her junior Daiwa Scarlet being one of the willing few. She is the co-protagonist of the film Umamusume: Pretty Derby – Beginning of a New Era.
- Vexen (Kingdom Hearts) – A founding member of Organization XIII and the head of the Replica Program, which creates artificial humanoids that serve as vessels for hearts.
- Viktor (League of Legends) – A scientist who replaced his body with a machine and wants to enhance the human race.
- Dr. Wily (Mega Man) – The primary antagonist of the original Mega Man series.
- Yuri (Red Alert 2) – A Soviet psychic and founder of the Psychic Corps. During World War II, he took part in Joseph Stalin's secret project, whose aim was to create mind-control technology, and an army which specialized in psychic warfare.

== Other ==
- Henry Emily (Five Nights at Freddy's) – Henry was the creator of the springlock animatronics, and possibly the original four animatronics. He is business partners with William Afton and is the father of Charlie Emily and Sammy Emily.
- Dr. Baron von Kluckinstein (Radioactive Chicken Heads)
- Morgus the Magnificent – A horror host of late-night science fiction and horror movies and television shows that originated in the New Orleans, Louisiana market.
- Professor Nebulous (Nebulous) – The leader of an eco-troubleshooting team.
- Professor Jocelyn Peabody (Dan Dare) – The scientific brains behind many of the team's most inventive ideas.

== Teams of scientists/engineers ==
- A team of scientists who investigate a deadly disease in The Andromeda Strain
- Arcot, Wade, and Morey – A group of scientist-inventors in science fiction stories by John W. Campbell.
- The Baltimore Gun Club in From the Earth to the Moon – Three of its wealthy members, Victor Barbicane, Stuyvesant Nicholl, and Ben Sharpe, build a giant gun which launches an occupied capsule to the Moon.
- The Challengers of the Unknown – A group of explorers and scientists.
- Edward Elric and Alphonse Elric (Fullmetal Alchemist) – Alchemist brothers who seek the legendary Philosopher's stone and end up saving their country with their alchemical skills.
- Eureka – A hidden town in Oregon where everyone is a scientific genius.
- Forensic scientists who use their skills to solve crimes in CSI: Crime Scene Investigation, CSI: NY and CSI: Miami
- Ghostbusters – Most of the central characters, including Peter Venkman, Raymond Stantz, Egon Spengler, and Winston Zeddemore, are parapsychologists who battle ghosts and other supernatural menaces with equipment of their own design.
- Global Dynamics (Eureka) – A major research facility in the town of Eureka, where most of America's top-secret government experiments are conducted.
- The K-science team: Hong Kong Shatterdome (Newton Geiszler and Hermann Gottlieb) – Heads of the kaiju science research team (Pacific Rim)
- The Kihara family of mad scientists in A Certain Magical Index, who are dedicated to the pursuit of science, regardless of the cost and often serve as antagonists.
- The Last Three of Venus – Venusian scientists and adversaries of Dan Dare.
- The Lone Gunmen – A group of ardent conspiracy theorists and computer hackers who often assist Mulder and Scully, though sometimes have their own adventures
- LOVEMUFFIN (Phineas and Ferb) – A group of mad scientists that Dr. Doofenshmirtz is a member of.
- STUDY (A Certain Scientific Railgun S) – A group of frustrated young adult scientists who serve as antagonists.
- The Speedwagon Foundation – A group consisting of doctors and archaeologists founded by Robert E. O. Speedwagon somewhere between the story arcs of Phantom Blood and Battle Tendency in JoJo's Bizarre Adventure, who are extremely knowledgeable on Stands, Pillar Men and Dio.
- Unorthodox Engineers – A misfit bunch of engineers who solve problems of alien technology/weird planets in the future.
