= Daisuke Serizawa =

Character from Godzilla film series

Dr. Daisuke Serizawa
- Godzilla character
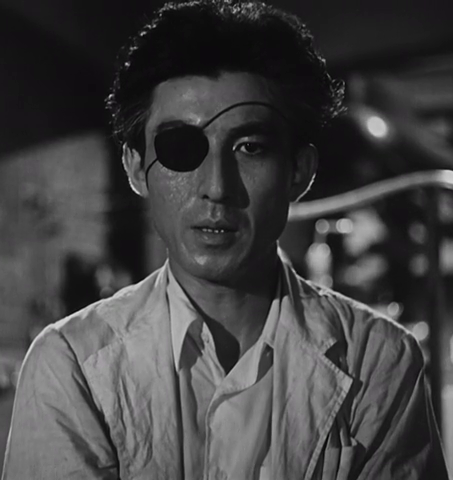
- Serizawa, as portrayed by Akihiko Hirata in Godzilla (1954)
- First appearance: Godzilla (1954)
- Portrayed by: Akihiko Hirata
- Voiced by: James Hong (Note: Hong dubbed Serizawa's dialogue in Godzilla, King of the Monsters! (1956))

In-universe information
- Occupation: Chemist
- Nationality: Japanese

Dr. Daisuke Serizawa is a fictional character from the 1954 film Godzilla. Portrayed by Akihiko Hirata, he is depicted as a Japanese scientist who invents the "Oxygen Destroyer", a devastating superweapon capable of liquefying organic matter by removing oxygen from water. Horrified by its potential for misuse in an era of nuclear proliferation, Serizawa uses it only once to kill Godzilla at the cost of his own life to ensure the technology is never replicated. The character embodies themes of scientific responsibility, the horrors of war, and the moral dilemmas of invention in the post-World War II context.

Film critics and scholars commonly read Serizawa as an analogue for postwar Japanese anxieties about nuclear weapons and scientific responsibility, comparing his sacrifice to the moral burden associated with figures such as J. Robert Oppenheimer.

Although Godzilla was his only film appearance, along with the 1956 American re-edit, Godzilla, King of the Monsters!, he has been referenced or reimagined in other subsequent media in the Godzilla franchise. He is often hailed as a tragic hero and was the first character to have killed Godzilla in the franchise. He would later appear in the 1995 film Godzilla vs. Destoroyah and the 2002 film Godzilla Against Mechagodzilla through stock footage from the original 1954 film.

Scholars interpret Serizawa as a post-war Japan symbol, with his scarred visage and aversion to weaponizing science mirroring atomic bombing trauma and the urgency to avoid repeating atrocities, as explored in kaiju cinema analyses.

== Development and portrayals ==
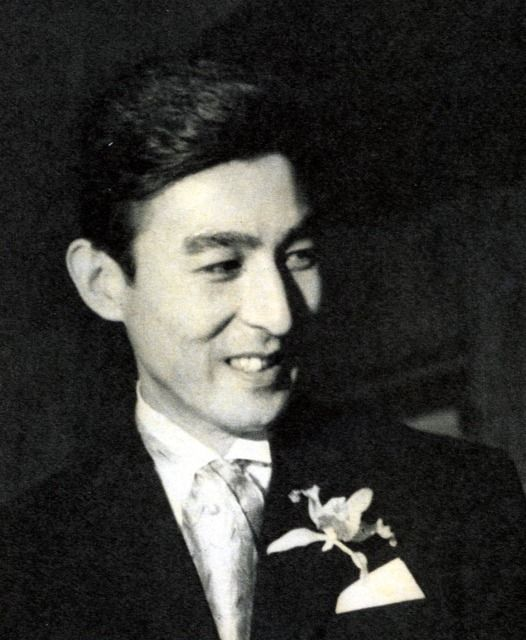
Akihiko Hirata (pictured in 1957) portrayed the character in Godzilla.

Shigeru Kayama wrote Serizawa as a J. Robert Oppenheimer-like figure whose invention raises questions about whether scientific discovery should be weaponized; Kayama's original story and later scholarship emphasize Serizawa's internal conflict, regretting creating a weapon of mass-destruction that's capable of killing Godzilla, and his eventual decision to destroy his research. Him having an eyepatch was a screenwriter's choice to show his injury from war. Serizawa's eyepatch and scarred demeanor are frequently interpreted as visual shorthand for wartime trauma and the broader wounds of post-war Japan. Kayama remarks that his "core intention was fulfilled" by Serizawa.

Serizawa was portrayed by Akihiko Hirata in Godzilla (1954). Hirata's performance as Serizawa was praised, marking it as one of his most iconic roles in film. Hirata also played roles of other scientist characters in the Godzilla film series. In the 1956 American re-edit, Godzilla, King of the Monsters!, Hirata's performance was dubbed in English by James Hong.

== Character biography ==
Dr. Daisuke Serizawa was a junior colleague of the paleontologist Dr. Kyohei Yamane, and was secretly in love with his daughter Emiko. Serizawa also served in the military during World War II, in which he lost his right eye in a battle; he wore an eyepatch to cover his empty eye-socket.

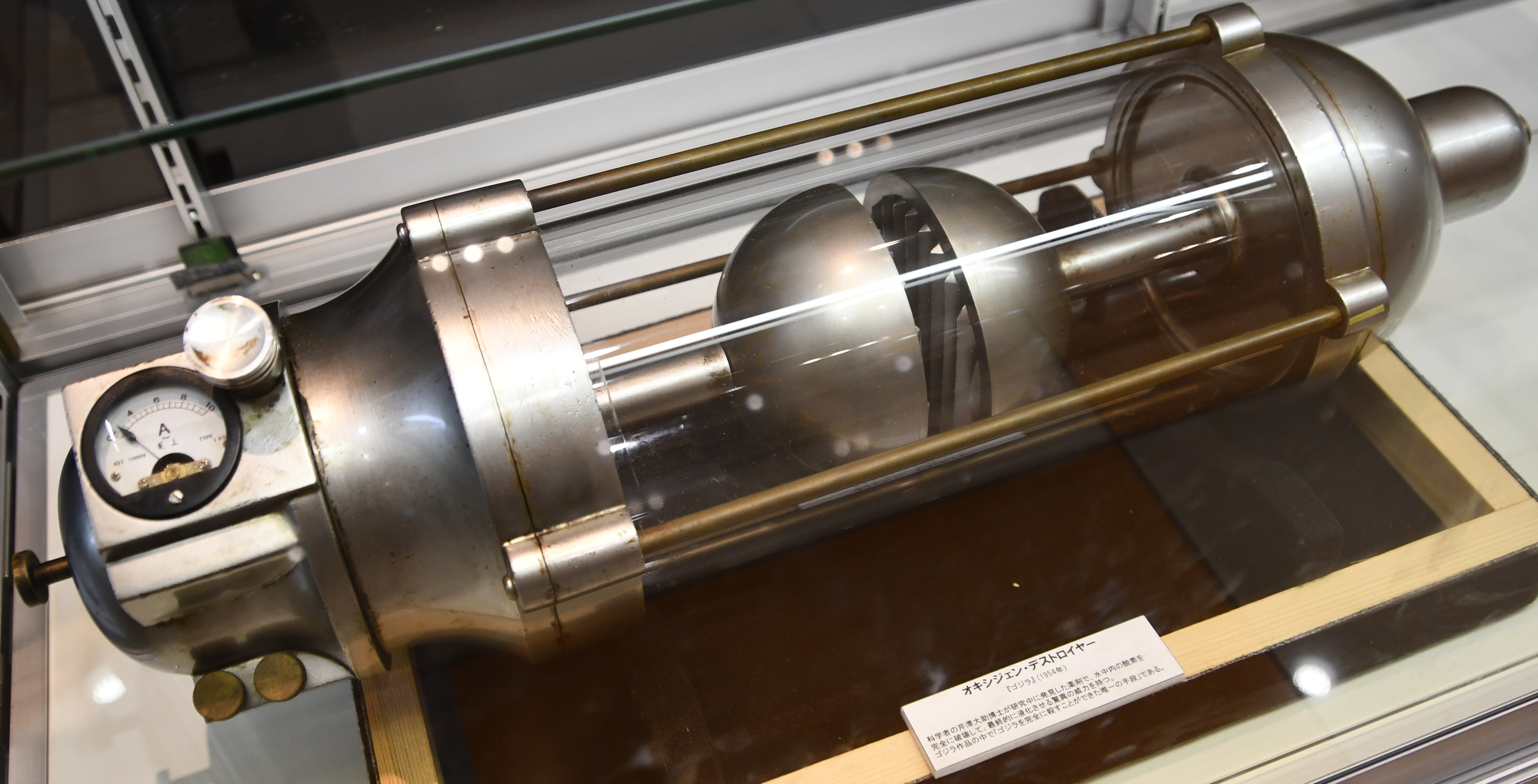
A prop of the Oxygen Destroyer, the device that Serizawa invented

After the war, Serizawa focused his life onto studying science. While studying oxygen, he accidentally created a deadly superweapon, the "Oxygen Destroyer." The resulting reaction from the device would split oxygen atoms into a fluid, which would then forcibly remove the oxygen from water and liquify any organic material.

Shortly after witnessing Godzilla's first attack, Serizawa decided to reveal the Oxygen Destroyer to Emiko. After horrifying her with the destructive effects from the Oxygen Destroyer, Serizawa made her promise to keep the invention a secret, explaining that he would not let the world know anything about his weapon of mass-destruction at all. Serizawa remained inside of his lab during Godzilla's remaining attacks on Tokyo, where he continued his research and experimentations on oxygen.

After Godzilla's second attack on Tokyo, Emiko chose to break her promise she made with Serizawa and told Hideto Ogata about the Oxygen Destroyer, believing that it would be the only way to stop Godzilla. Emiko and Ogata both went to Serizawa's lab, hoping to convince him to use the Oxygen Destroyer against the giant monster. At first, Serizawa refused to use it, hypothesizing that people would exploit the use of his weapon in the future, claiming it would cause more destruction than nuclear weapons. He was briefly upset with Ogata in defense of his decision, but paused when he saw a news report on the television, showing the apocalyptic state Tokyo was in after Godzilla's attack. Shaken by the devastation in Tokyo, Serizawa agreed to use the Oxygen Destroyer once.

Serizawa, intending to make sure that the secret behind his Oxygen Destroyer remained a secret, burned all of his research notes, assuring Emiko that this would be the only way to prevent his secret from being exploited in the future. Serizawa and Ogata went with a group of scientists and reporters onboard a boat to Tokyo Bay, finding Godzilla resting on the seabed. Serizawa and Ogata dove to the bottom of the ocean after checking that the Oxygen Destroyer was going to be used correctly. Serizawa detonated the device, and Ogata was raised back to the surface of Tokyo Bay. Noticing his device was working, Serizawa told Emiko and Ogata to live a happy life together before he severed his line, taking the secret of the Oxygen Destroyer to his grave, with the device killing himself and Godzilla in the process.

=== Later film appearances ===
In the 1995 film Godzilla vs. Destoroyah, it features scientist Kensaku Ijuin developing "Micro-Oxygen," a substance echoing Serizawa's work. Emiko, now older, warns her niece Yukari Yamane of its dangers, drawing direct parallels to the Oxygen Destroyer. Serizawa briefly appears in stock footage from the original film and in photos inside of Emiko's home.

In the 2002 film Godzilla Against Mechagodzilla, it recaps the events of the original film in which Serizawa kills the original Godzilla with the Oxygen Destroyer via some stock footage from said film.

== Reception and analysis ==
Serizawa has been praised for his complexity as a character in early kaiju cinema, diverging from typical mad scientist tropes prevalent in Western media. Film scholar William Tsutsui notes that scientists in the Godzilla series, including Serizawa, are often depicted as honorable truth-seekers rather than villains, aligning with postwar Japanese views on scientific ethics; commentators emphasize his choice to burn his notes and die with the Oxygen Destroyer as a critique of the nuclear arms race and as an act intended to prevent further weaponization. Critics also connect Serizawa's decision to contemporaneous events, such as the Lucky Dragon No. 5 incident, arguing that the film channels national anxieties about nuclear testing and its consequences.

Critics have frequently interpreted Serizawa as a symbol of nuclear regret and the moral weight of scientific discovery. In the original film, his reluctance to deploy the Oxygen Destroyer reflects real-world anxieties following the 1954 Lucky Dragon No. 5 incident, which inspired Godzilla's creation. Physicist Sidney Perkowitz compares Serizawa's invention to nuclear weapons, noting its initial peaceful intent before its weaponization, and emphasizes his self-sacrifice to avert an arms race escalation. This act of atonement is seen as evoking J. Robert Oppenheimer's remorse over the Manhattan Project, positioning Serizawa as a tragic hero in anti-nuclear narratives.

=== Ishirō Serizawa ===
Ishirō Serizawa
- Monsterverse character
- Ishirō Serizawa, as portrayed by Ken Watanabe in Godzilla (2014)
- First appearance: Godzilla (2014)
- Last appearance: Godzilla: King of the Monsters (2019)
- Portrayed by: Ken Watanabe

In-universe information
- Occupation: Biologist
- Affiliation: Monarch
- Family: Eiji Serizawa (father)
- Children: Ren Serizawa (son)
- Nationality: Japanese

Serizawa's character has endured as a prototype for scientists in the Godzilla franchise, influencing subsequent iterations and homages. In analyses of the series, he is positioned as the "original" Serizawa, whose themes of sacrifice recur in later versions, such as Ishirō Serizawa, who first appears in the 2014 Monsterverse film Godzilla. Ishirō Serizawa echoes Daisuke's self-sacrifice by manually detonating a nuclear warhead to revive Godzilla in Godzilla: King of the Monsters (2019), directly referencing the original Serizawa's moral dilemmas. His first name "Ishirō" is after the director of the original 1954 film, Ishirō Honda.

== See also ==
- List of fictional scientists and engineers

== Bibliography ==
- Svensson, Arne (1971). Japan. A. Zwemmer Limited. ISBN 978-0-498-07654-1.
- Ryfle, Steve (1998). Japan's Favorite Mon-star: The Unauthorized Biography of "The Big G". ECW Press. ISBN 978-1-55022-348-4.
- Erb, Cynthia Marie (1998). Tracking King Kong: A Hollywood Icon in World Culture. Wayne State University Press. ISBN 978-0-8143-2686-2.
- Solomon, Brian (2000-01-01). Godzilla FAQ: All That's Left to Know About the King of the Monsters. Bloomsbury Publishing PLC. ISBN 978-1-4950-9399-9.
- Glut, Donald F. (2001-01-30). Jurassic Classics: A Collection of Saurian Essays and Mesozoic Musings. McFarland. ISBN 978-0-7864-6246-9.
- Bowyer, Justin (2004). The Cinema of Japan & Korea. Wallflower Press. ISBN 978-1-904764-11-3.
- Balmain, Colette (2008-10-14). Introduction to Japanese Horror Film. Edinburgh University Press. ISBN 978-0-7486-3059-2.
- Jess-Cooke, Carolyn (2009-02-02). Film Sequels: Theory and Practice from Hollywood to Bollywood. Edinburgh University Press. ISBN 978-0-7486-3133-9.
- Bogue, Mike (2017-09-14). Apocalypse Then: American and Japanese Atomic Cinema, 1951-1967. McFarland. ISBN 978-1-4766-6841-3.
- Rhoads, Sean; McCorkle, Brooke (2018-02-12). Japan's Green Monsters: Environmental Commentary in Kaiju Cinema. McFarland. ISBN 978-1-4766-6390-6.
- Nollen, Scott Allen (2019-03-11). Takashi Shimura: Chameleon of Japanese Cinema. McFarland. ISBN 978-1-4766-3569-9.
- Skipper, Graham (2022). Godzilla: The Official Guide to the King of the Monsters (in English and Japanese). Welbeck Publishing. ISBN 9781802790009.
- Barr, Jason (2023-10-02). The Kaiju Connection: Giant Monsters and Ourselves. McFarland. ISBN 978-1-4766-5150-7.
