= Godzilla (1954 film) =

Japanese monster film by Ishirō Honda

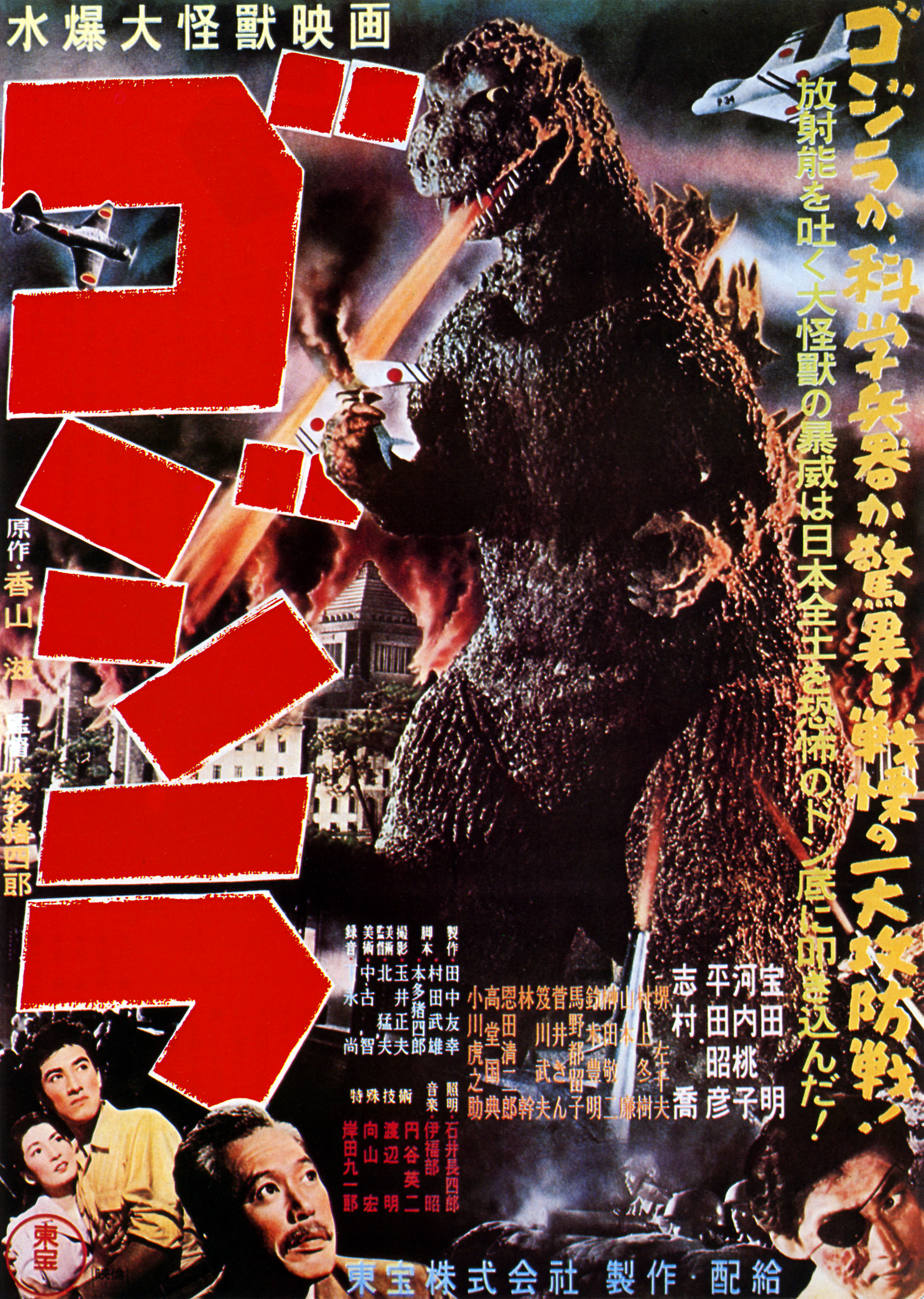
- Theatrical release poster

Japanese name
- Katakana: ゴジラ
Transcriptions
- Revised Hepburn: Gojira
- Directed by: Ishirō Honda
- Screenplay by: Takeo Murata; Ishirō Honda
- Story by: Shigeru Kayama
- Produced by: Tomoyuki Tanaka
- Starring: Akira Takarada; Momoko Kōchi; Akihiko Hirata; Takashi Shimura
- Cinematography: Masao Tamai
- Edited by: Taichi Taira
- Music by: Akira Ifukube
- Production company: Toho
- Distributed by: Toho
- Release dates: October 27, 1954 (Nagoya); November 3, 1954 (Japan)
- Running time: 96 minutes
- Country: Japan
- Language: Japanese
- Budget: ¥62.9 million (Note: According to Steve Ryfle, the film had a production budget of approximately ¥62,893,455, equal to roughly US$900,000 in 1954. Print and advertisement costs brought the total budget to ¥100 million, roughly US$1.5 million in 1954.) ($900,000)
- Box office: $2.25 million

Godzilla (Japanese: ゴジラ, Hepburn: Gojira) (Note: In 2004, Rialto Pictures released the film in a limited theatrical run as Godzilla. In 2006, Classic Media released the film on DVD/Blu-ray as Gojira. In 2012, The Criterion Collection released its own remastered version on DVD/Blu-ray as Godzilla. In 2014, Rialto Pictures re-released the film in a limited theatrical run as Godzilla: The Japanese Original to avoid confusion with Legendary's Godzilla film.) is a 1954 Japanese epic (Note: Attributed to multiple references:) kaiju film directed and co-written by Ishirō Honda, with special effects by Eiji Tsuburaya. Produced and distributed by Toho, it is the first film in the Godzilla franchise. The film stars Akira Takarada, Momoko Kōchi, Akihiko Hirata, Takashi Shimura, with Haruo Nakajima and Katsumi Tezuka as Godzilla. In the film, Japanese authorities deal with the sudden appearance of a gigantic monster, mutated from nuclear bomb testing.

Godzilla entered production after a Japanese-Indonesian co-production collapsed. Tsuburaya originally proposed a giant octopus before the filmmakers decided on a dinosaur-inspired creature. Godzilla pioneered a form of special effects called suitmation in which a stunt performer wearing a suit interacts with miniature sets. Principal photography ran 51 days, and special effects photography ran 71 days.

Godzilla premiered in Nagoya on October 27, 1954, and received a wide release in Japan on November 3. It was met with mixed reviews upon release but was a box-office success, winning the Japanese Movie Association Award for Best Special Effects. The film earned ¥183 million in distributor rentals, making it the eighth-highest-grossing Japanese film of that year. In 1956, Trans World Releasing Corp. released the film in the United States as Godzilla, King of the Monsters!, a heavily re-edited "Americanized" version that toned down many of the film's political themes and integrated new footage of Raymond Burr as the lead. Body doubles, trick photography, and careful editing were utilized to make Burr seem as if he was part of the original Japanese production.

Godzilla spawned a multimedia franchise that was recognized by Guinness World Records as the longest-running film franchise in history; the film and Tsuburaya have also been largely credited for establishing the template for tokusatsu media. The film received reappraisal in later years and is widely regarded as one of the greatest monster films ever made, while its title character is recognised as an icon of international popular culture.

The film was followed by Godzilla Raids Again, released on April 24, 1955.

== Plot ==
After the Japanese freighter Eiko-maru is destroyed near Odo Island, another ship—the Bingo-maru—is sent to investigate, only to meet the same fate with few survivors. A fishing boat from Odo is also destroyed, with one survivor. Fishing catches mysteriously drop to zero, blamed by an elder on the ancient sea creature known as "Godzilla". Reporters arrive on Odo Island to further investigate. A villager tells one of the reporters that something in the sea is ruining the fishing. That evening, a storm strikes the island, destroying the reporters' helicopter, and Godzilla, briefly seen, destroys 17 homes, kills nine people, and kills 20 of the villagers' livestock.

Odo residents travel to Tokyo to demand disaster relief. The villagers' and reporters' evidence describes damage consistent with something large crushing the village. The government sends paleontologist Kyohei Yamane to investigate the island, where giant radioactive footprints and a trilobite are discovered. The village alarm bell is rung, and Yamane and the villagers rush to see the monster, but immediately retreat after interpreting it as a giant dinosaur. Yamane presents his findings in Tokyo, estimating that Godzilla is 50 metres (160 ft) tall and has evolved from an ancient sea creature, becoming a terrestrial creature. He concludes that Godzilla has been disturbed by underwater hydrogen bomb testing. Debate ensues about notifying the public about the danger of the monster. Meanwhile, 17 ships are lost at sea.

Ten frigates are dispatched to attempt to kill the monster using depth charges. The mission disappoints Yamane, who wants Godzilla to be studied. When Godzilla survives the attack, officials appeal to Yamane for ideas on how to kill the monster. Still, Yamane tells them that Godzilla is unkillable, having survived H-bomb testing, and that it must be studied. Yamane's daughter, Emiko, decides to break off her arranged engagement to Yamane's colleague, Daisuke Serizawa, because of her love for Hideto Ogata, a salvage ship captain. When a reporter arrives and asks to interview Serizawa, Emiko escorts the reporter to Serizawa's home. After Serizawa refuses to divulge his current work to the reporter, he gives Emiko a demonstration of his recent project on the condition that she must keep it a secret. The demonstration horrifies her, and she leaves without mentioning the engagement. Shortly after she returns home, Godzilla surfaces from Tokyo Bay and attacks Shinagawa. After attacking a passing train, Godzilla returns to the ocean.

After consulting international experts, the Japan Self-Defense Forces constructs a 30 metres (98 ft) tall and 50,000 volt electrified fence along the coast and deploys forces to kill Godzilla. Dismayed that there is no plan to study Godzilla for its resistance to radiation, Yamane returns home, where Emiko and Ogata await, hoping to get his consent for them to wed. When Ogata disagrees with Yamane, arguing that Godzilla's threat outweighs any potential benefits from studying the monster, Yamane tells him to leave. Godzilla resurfaces and breaks through the fence to Tokyo with its atomic breath, unleashing more destruction across the city. Further attempts to kill the monster with tanks and fighter jets fail, and Godzilla returns to the ocean. The day after, hospitals and shelters are crowded with the maimed and the dead, with some survivors suffering from radiation sickness.

Distraught by the devastation, Emiko tells Ogata about Serizawa's research, a weapon called the "Oxygen Destroyer", which disintegrates oxygen atoms and causes organisms to asphyxiate, then dissolve, leaving nothing behind. Emiko and Ogata go to Serizawa to convince him to use the Oxygen Destroyer. Still, he initially refuses, explaining that if he uses the device, the world's superpowers will force him to construct more Oxygen Destroyers as a superweapon. After watching a program displaying the nation's current tragedy, Serizawa finally accepts their pleas. As Serizawa burns his notes, Emiko breaks down crying.

A navy ship takes Ogata and Serizawa to plant the device in Tokyo Bay. After finding Godzilla, Serizawa activates the device and cuts off his air supply, taking the secret of the Oxygen Destroyer to his grave. The Oxygen Destroyer successfully kills Godzilla and disintegrates its body; many mourn Serizawa's death. Yamane believes that if nuclear weapons testing continues, another Godzilla may rise in the future.

== Cast ==
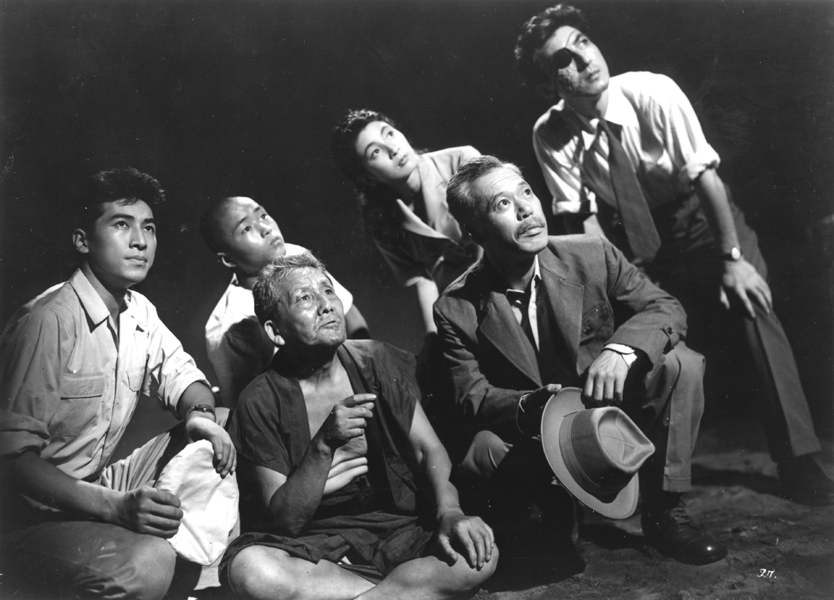
Left to right: Hideto Ogata (Akira Takarada), Shinjiki Yamada (Toyoaki Suzuki), the old fisherman (Kuninori Kōdō), Emiko Yamane (Momoko Kōchi), Kyohei Yamane (Takashi Shimura), and Daisuke Serizawa (Akihiko Hirata).

- Akira Takarada as Hideto Ogata
- Momoko Kōchi as Emiko Yamane
- Akihiko Hirata as Dr. Daisuke Serizawa
- Takashi Shimura as Dr. Kyohei Yamane
- Fuyuki Murakami as Dr. Tanabe
- Sachio Sakai as Hagiwara
- Ren Yamamoto as Masaji Yamada
- Toyoaki Suzuki as Shinkichi Yamada
- Toranosuke Ogawa as the President of the Nankai Shipping Company
- Hiroshi Hayashi as the Chairman of Diet Committee
- Seijiro Onda as Oyama, Diet Committee member
- Kin Sugai as Ozawa, Diet Committee member
- Shoichi Hirose as a member of the Diet Committee
- Kuninori Kōdō as the old fisherman
- Yū Fujiki as Eiko-Maru wireless communications officer
- Kenji Sahara as a reporter and a partygoer
- Ishirō Honda as a substation worker
- Haruo Nakajima as Godzilla, a newspaper reporter, and a substation engineer
- Katsumi Tezuka as Godzilla and a newspaper deskman

Cast taken from Japan's Favorite Mon-Star, except where cited otherwise.

== Themes ==
In the film, Godzilla symbolizes nuclear holocaust from Japan's perspective and has since been culturally identified as a strong metaphor for nuclear weapons. Producer Tomoyuki Tanaka stated, "The theme of the film, from the beginning, was the terror of the bomb. Mankind had created the bomb, and now nature was going to take revenge on mankind." Director Ishirō Honda filmed Godzilla's Tokyo rampage to mirror the atomic bombings of Hiroshima and Nagasaki and stated, "If Godzilla had been a dinosaur or some other animal, he would have been killed by just one cannonball. But if he were equal to an atomic bomb, we wouldn't know what to do. So, I took the characteristics of an atomic bomb and applied them to Godzilla."

On March 1, 1954, just a few months before the film was made, the Japanese fishing vessel Daigo Fukuryū Maru ("Lucky Dragon No. 5") had been showered with radioactive fallout from the U.S. military's 15-megaton "Castle Bravo" hydrogen bomb test at nearby Bikini Atoll. The boat's catch was contaminated, spurring a panic in Japan about the safety of eating fish, and the crew was sickened, with one crew member eventually dying from radiation sickness. The event led to the emergence of a large and enduring anti-nuclear movement that gathered 30 million signatures on an anti-nuclear petition by August 1955 and eventually became institutionalized as the Japan Council against Atomic and Hydrogen Bombs. The film's opening scene of Godzilla destroying a Japanese vessel is a direct reference to these events and had a strong impact on Japanese viewers, with the recent event still fresh in the mind of the public.

Academics Anne Allison, Thomas Schnellbächer, and Steve Ryfle have said that Godzilla contains political and cultural undertones that can be attributed to what the Japanese had experienced in World War II and that Japanese audiences were able to connect emotionally to the monster. They theorized that the viewers saw Godzilla as a victim and felt that the creature's backstory reminded them of their experiences in World War II. The academics have also claimed that as the atomic bomb testing that woke Godzilla was carried out by the United States, the film can in a way be seen to blame the United States for the problems and struggles that Japan experienced after World War II had ended. They also felt that the film could have served as a cultural coping method to help the people of Japan move on from the events of the war.

Brian Merchant from Motherboard called the film "a bleak, powerful metaphor for nuclear power that still endures today," and on its themes, he stated: "It's an unflinchingly bleak, deceptively powerful film about coping with and taking responsibility for the incomprehensible, man-made tragedy. Specifically, nuclear tragedies. It's arguably the best window into post-war attitudes towards nuclear power we've got—as seen from the perspective of its greatest victims." Terrence Rafferty from The New York Times said Godzilla was "an obvious gigantic, unsubtle, grimly purposeful metaphor for the atomic bomb" and felt the film was "extraordinarily solemn, full of earnest discussions".

Mark Jacobson from the website of New York magazine said that Godzilla "transcends humanist prattle. Very few constructs have so perfectly embodied the overriding fears of a particular era. He is the symbol of a world gone wrong, a work of man that once created cannot be taken back or deleted. He rears up out of the sea as a creature of no particular belief system, apart from even the most elastic version of evolution and taxonomy, a reptilian id that lives inside the deepest recesses of the collective unconscious that cannot be reasoned with, a merciless undertaker who broaches no deals." Regarding the film, Jacobson stated, "Honda's first Godzilla... is in line with these inwardly turned post-war films and perhaps the most brutally unforgiving of them. Shame-ridden self-flagellation was in order, and who better to supply the rubber-suited psychic punishment than the Rorschach-shaped big fella himself?"

Tim Martin from The Daily Telegraph said that the original 1954 film was "a far cry from its B-movie successors. It was a sober allegory of a film with ambitions as large as its thrice-normal budget, designed to shock and horrify an adult audience. Its roster of frightening images—cities in flames, overstuffed hospitals, irradiated children—would have been all too familiar to cinema-goers for whom memories of Hiroshima and Nagasaki were still less than a decade old, while its script posed deliberately inflammatory questions about the balance of postwar power and the development of nuclear energy." Martin also commented on how the film's themes were omitted in the American version by stating, "Its thematic preoccupation with nuclear energy proved even less acceptable to the American distributors who, after buying the film, began an extensive reshoot and re-cut for Western markets."

Some Japanese right-wing critics and film scholars interpret Godzilla spiritually as the unquiet souls of Japanese soldiers killed in the Pacific War. Inspired by Kunio Yanagita's folklore studies, the idea gained prominence in the 1990s, possibly first proposed by folklorist Norio Akasaka around 1992. It was popularized by critic Saburo Kawamoto in his 1994 book Revisiting Postwar Japanese Film. Kawamoto theorized that these restless spirits manifested as Godzilla to exact vengeance on postwar Japan, citing the creature's apparent refusal to attack the Imperial Palace as evidence of this intent. In this framework, Godzilla functions as an onryō, a wrathful vengeful spirit. The film's composer Akira Ifukube also endorsed this interpretation. Filmmaker Shusuke Kaneko later incorporated it into Godzilla, Mothra and King Ghidorah: Giant Monsters All-Out Attack (2001).

== Production ==
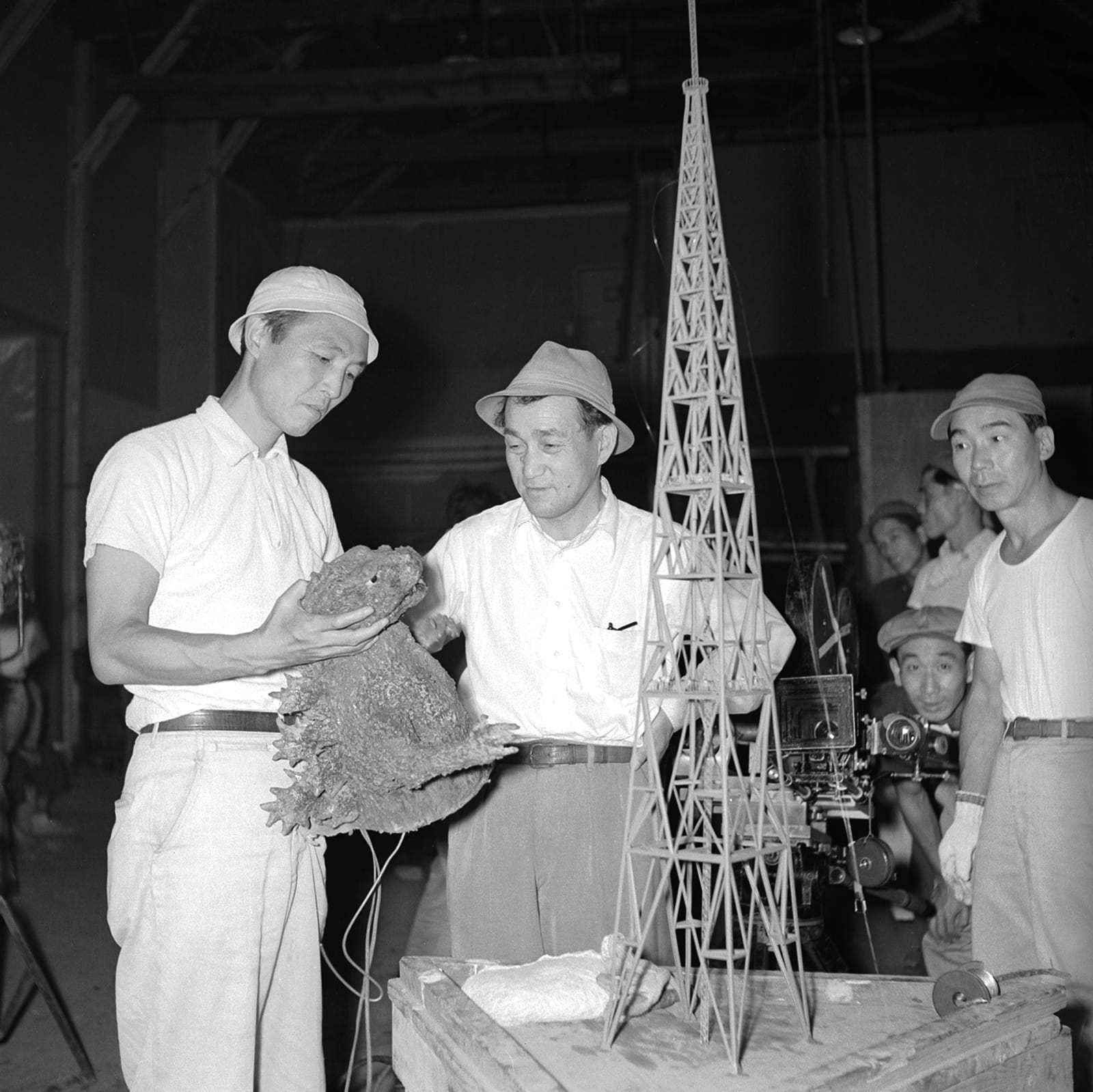
Ishirō Honda (left) and Eiji Tsuburaya (center) on the set of Godzilla

=== Crew ===
- Ishirō Honda – director, co-writer
- Eiji Tsuburaya – special effects director
- Kōji Kajita – assistant director
- Teruo Maki – production manager
- Choshiro Ishii – lighting
- Takeo Kita – chief art director
- Satoshi Chuko – art director
- Akira Watanabe – special effects art director
- Kuichirō Kishida – special effects lighting
- Teizō Toshimitsu – monster builder
- Hisashi Shimonaga – sound recording
- Ichiro Minawa (Note: Sometimes credited as Ichiro Mitsunawa.) – sound and musical effects

Personnel taken from The Criterion Collection.

=== Development ===
"[If] our hearts were not in it 100 percent it would not have worked. We wanted [the monster] to possess the terrifying characteristics of an atomic bomb. This was our approach, without any reservations."

— Honda on his and the crew's vision for the film.

In 1954, Toho originally planned to produce In the Shadow of Glory (栄光のかげに, Eikō no Kage ni), (Note: Also known as Behind the Glory and In the Shadow of Honor.) a Japanese-Indonesian co-production that would have starred Ryō Ikebe as a former Japanese soldier who was stationed in the Dutch East Indies during the Japanese occupation of Indonesia, and Yoshiko Yamaguchi as his half-Indonesian love interest. However, anti-Japanese sentiment in Indonesia put political pressure on the government to deny visas for Japanese filmmakers. Another potential factor for the film's cancellation was because of then-ongoing disagreements between the Japanese and Indonesian governments over World War II-era colonial reparations, an issue that would not be resolved until 1958. The film was to be co-produced with Perfini, filmed on location in Jakarta in color, a first for a major Toho production, and was to open markets for Japanese films in Southeast Asia.

Producer Tomoyuki Tanaka flew to Jakarta to renegotiate with the Indonesian government but was unsuccessful. On the flight back to Japan, he conceived the idea for a giant monster film, inspired by the 1953 film The Beast from 20,000 Fathoms and the Daigo Fukuryū Maru incident, which happened in March 1954. The film's opening sequence is a direct reference to the incident. Tanaka felt the film had potential because nuclear fears were generating news and monster films were becoming popular because of the financial success of The Beast from 20,000 Fathoms and the 1952 re-release of King Kong, the latter of which earned more money than previous releases.

During his flight, Tanaka wrote an outline with the working title The Giant Monster from 20,000 Leagues Under the Sea (海底二万哩から来た大怪獣, Kaitei ni man-mairu kara kita Daikaijū), and pitched it to executive producer Iwao Mori. Mori approved the project in mid–April 1954 after special effects director Eiji Tsuburaya agreed to do the film's effects and confirmed that the film was financially feasible. Mori also felt the project was perfect as a vehicle for Tsuburaya and to test the storyboarding system that he instituted at the time. Mori also approved Tanaka's choice to have Ishirō Honda direct the film and shortened the title of the production to Project G (G for Giant), as well as giving the production classified status and ordered Tanaka to minimize his attention on other films and mainly focus on Project G.

Toho originally intended for Senkichi Taniguchi to direct the film, as he was originally attached to direct In the Shadow of Glory. However, Taniguchi declined the assignment. Honda was not Toho's first choice for the film's director, but his wartime experience made him an ideal candidate for the film's anti-nuclear themes. Several other directors passed on the project, feeling the idea was "stupid," but Honda accepted the assignment because of his interest in science and "unusual things" and stated, "I had no problem taking it seriously." It was during the production of Godzilla that Honda worked with assistant director Kōji Kajita for the first time. Afterwards, Kajita would go on to collaborate with Honda as his chief assistant director for 17 films over the course of 10 years. Science fiction films lacked respect from film critics so Honda, Tanaka, and Tsuburaya agreed on depicting a monster attack as if it were a real event, with the serious tone of a documentary.

=== Writing ===
Tsuburaya submitted an outline of his own that was written three years before Godzilla and featured a giant octopus attacking ships in the Indian Ocean. However, Tanaka sought sci-fi and horror writer Shigeru Kayama to write the story based on Tanaka's ideas, who accepted the job on May 12, 1954. Kayama was initially hesitant, feeling that the subject matter was "too sensitive" and could easily be mocked under the wrong direction, but he found the idea of protesting nuclear weapons intriguing. According to Kayama's diaries, he had completed a 50-page treatment in 11 days. His treatment borrowed elements from films such as The Lost World, King Kong, The Beast from 20,000 Fathoms, and from his own 1952 short story, Jira Monster, which featured a reptilian creature with hind legs terrorizing primitive civilians and withstanding weaponry.

In Kayama's treatment, Dr. Yamane is depicted wearing dark shades, a cape, and living in a European-style house from which he emerged only at night. Godzilla was portrayed as more animal-like by coming ashore to feed on animals, with an ostensibly gorilla-like interest in females. Kayama's story also featured less destruction and borrowed a scene from The Beast from 20,000 Fathoms by having Godzilla attack a lighthouse. Kayama added his own critical stance on nuclear weapons by opening with a voice-over detailing and criticizing the 1952 and 1954 hydrogen bomb tests. This was followed by a montage of shots that included real footage of the Daigo Fukuryū Maru aftermath, its victims, and the paranoia that followed.

Takeo Murata and Honda co-wrote the screenplay in three weeks and confined themselves in a Japanese inn in Tokyo's Shibuya ward. On writing the script, Murata stated, "Director Honda and I...racked our brains to make Mr. Kayama's original treatment into a full, working vision." Murata said that Tsuburaya and Tanaka pitched their ideas as well. Tanaka requested that they do not spend too much money, but Tsuburaya encouraged them to "do whatever it takes to make it work." Murata and Honda redeveloped key characters and elements by adding Emiko's love triangle. In Kayama's story, Serizawa was depicted as merely a colleague of Dr. Yamane's. Godzilla's full appearance was to be revealed during the Odo Island hurricane, but Honda and Murata opted to show parts of the creature as the film built up to his full reveal. Honda and Murata also introduced the characters Hagiwara and Dr. Tanabe in their draft, but the role of Shinkichi, who had a substantial role in Kayama's story, was cut down.

Honda toned down much of Kayama's political criticism, especially the opening because he felt it was inappropriate to use the Daigo Fukuryū Maru incident and wanted to depict Godzilla as an invisible fear.

A novelization, written by Kayama, was published on October 25, 1954, by Iwaya Shoten as Monster Godzilla (怪獣ゴジラ, Kaijū Gojira). Another novelization by Kayama of the film and its first sequel was published by Shimamura Shuppan in July 1955 as Godzilla: Tokyo/Osaka Editions (ゴジラ 東京・大阪篇, Gojira: Tōkyō/Ōsaka-hen); the latter was later published under the title Godzilla and Godzilla Raids Again on October 3, 2023 by University of Minnesota Press in an English translation by Jeffrey Angles.

=== Creature design ===
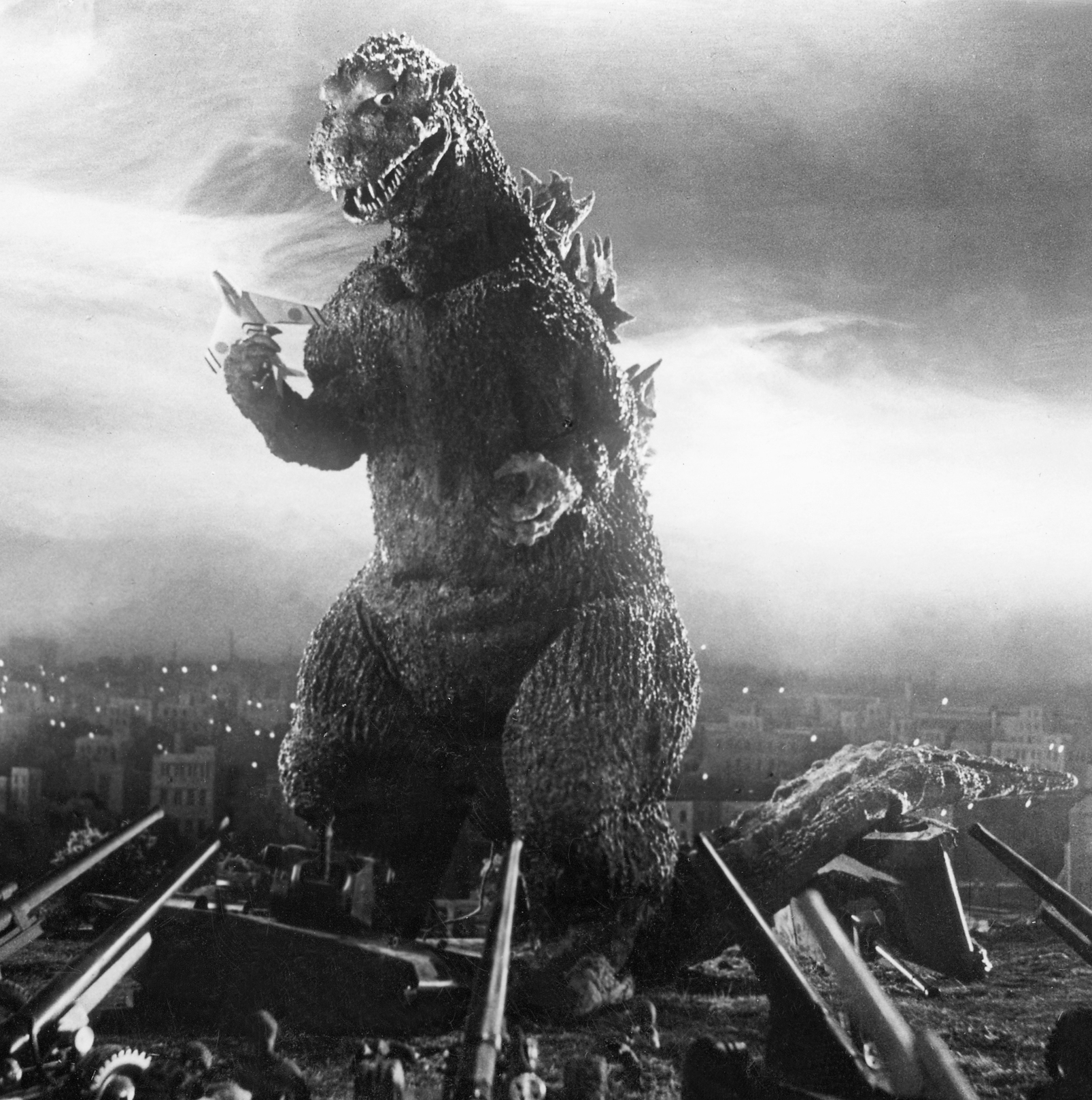
The filmmakers took inspiration from various dinosaurs to shape Godzilla's final design.

Godzilla was designed by Teizō Toshimitsu and Akira Watanabe under Eiji Tsuburaya's supervision. Early on, Tanaka contemplated having the monster be gorilla-like or whale-like in design because of the name "Gojira", a combination of the Japanese words for gorilla (ゴリラ, gorira) and whale (クジラ, kujira), but he eventually settled on a dinosaur-like design. Wasuke Abe was hired earlier to design Godzilla, but his ideas were later rejected since Godzilla looked too humanoid and mammalian, with a head shaped like a mushroom cloud; however, Abe was retained to help draw the film's storyboards.

Toshimitsu and Watanabe decided to base Godzilla's design on dinosaurs and, by using dinosaur books and magazines as a reference, combined elements of a Tyrannosaurus, Iguanodon and the dorsal plates of a Stegosaurus. Despite wanting to use stop motion animation, Tsuburaya reluctantly settled on suitmation. Toshimitsu sculpted three clay models on which the suit would be based. The first two were rejected, but the third was approved by Tsuburaya, Tanaka, and Honda.

The Godzilla suit was constructed by Kanju Yagi, Yasuei Yagi, and Eizo Kaimai, who used thin bamboo sticks and wire to build a frame for the interior of the suit and added metal mesh and cushioning over it to bolster its structure and finally applied coats of latex. Coats of molten rubber were additionally applied, followed by carved indentations and strips of latex glued onto the surface of the suit to create Godzilla's scaly hide. This first version of the suit weighed 100 kilograms (220 pounds). For close-ups, Toshimitsu created a smaller-scale, mechanical, hand-operated puppet that sprayed streams of mist from its mouth to act as Godzilla's atomic breath.

Haruo Nakajima and Katsumi Tezuka were chosen to perform in the Godzilla suit because of their strength and endurance. At the first costume fitting, Nakajima fell down inside the suit since it had been created by using heavy latex and inflexible materials. This first version of the suit was cut into two and used for scenes requiring only partial shots of Godzilla or close-ups, with the lower half fitted with rope suspenders for Nakajima to wear. For full-body shots, a second identical suit was created, which was made lighter than the first suit, but Nakajima could still be inside for only three minutes before passing out. Nakajima lost 20 pounds during the production of the film. Nakajima would go on to portray Godzilla and other monsters until his retirement in 1972. Tezuka filmed scenes in the Godzilla suit, but his older body made him unable to fully commit to the physical demands required by the role. As a result, few of his scenes made it to the final cut, as very few scenes were considered usable. Tezuka filled in for Nakajima when he was unavailable or needed relief from the physically demanding role.

=== Name ===
Godzilla's name was also a source of consternation for the filmmakers. Because the monster had no name, the first draft of the film was not titled after the monster but rather titled G, also known as Kaihatsu keikaku G ("Development Plan G"); the "G" stood for "Giant." Nakajima confirmed that Toho held a contest to name the monster. The monster was eventually named Gojira. A prevalent rumor suggested that Gojira was taken from the nickname of a hulking Toho stagehand. Tanaka became indirectly responsible for the rumor after having confirmed that the name Gojira was suggested to him by a colleague who knew a burly employee nicknamed as such, stating that no one took the name seriously but eventually all realized that it was a "fitting name" for the monster. Fumio Saito, a former member of Toho's literature department, further spurred the rumor, stating that due to the secrecy behind the production, the film couldn't be properly promoted in any way. So much so that he alleged that the "real man behind the nickname Gojira complained to us."

In a 1998 BBC documentary on Godzilla, Kimi Honda, the widow of the director, dismissed the employee-name story as a tall tale and stated that she believed that Honda, Tanaka, and Tsuburaya gave "considerable thought" to the name of the monster, "the backstage boys at Toho loved to joke around with tall stories, but I don't believe that one." In 2003, a Japanese television special claimed to have identified the anonymous hulking Toho stage hand as Shiro Amikura, a Toho contract actor from the 1950s. However, Nakajima noted that the identity of Amikura "came out of the blue."

Film scholars Steve Ryfle and Ed Godziszewski noted inconsistencies in testimonies from those that verified the employee-name rumor, mostly citing faulty memory. They alluded to Kayama's diaries that showed he had already coined the name Gojira before the rumor ever surfaced and that the name was likely derived from Kayama's short story Jira Monster. As for the English variation of the name, they surmised that it was conceived by Toho's international sales department for export (no one has claimed credit for it) and that the English name is a "phonetic translation of the three monosyllabic katakana characters (Go-Dzi-La)."

=== Special effects ===
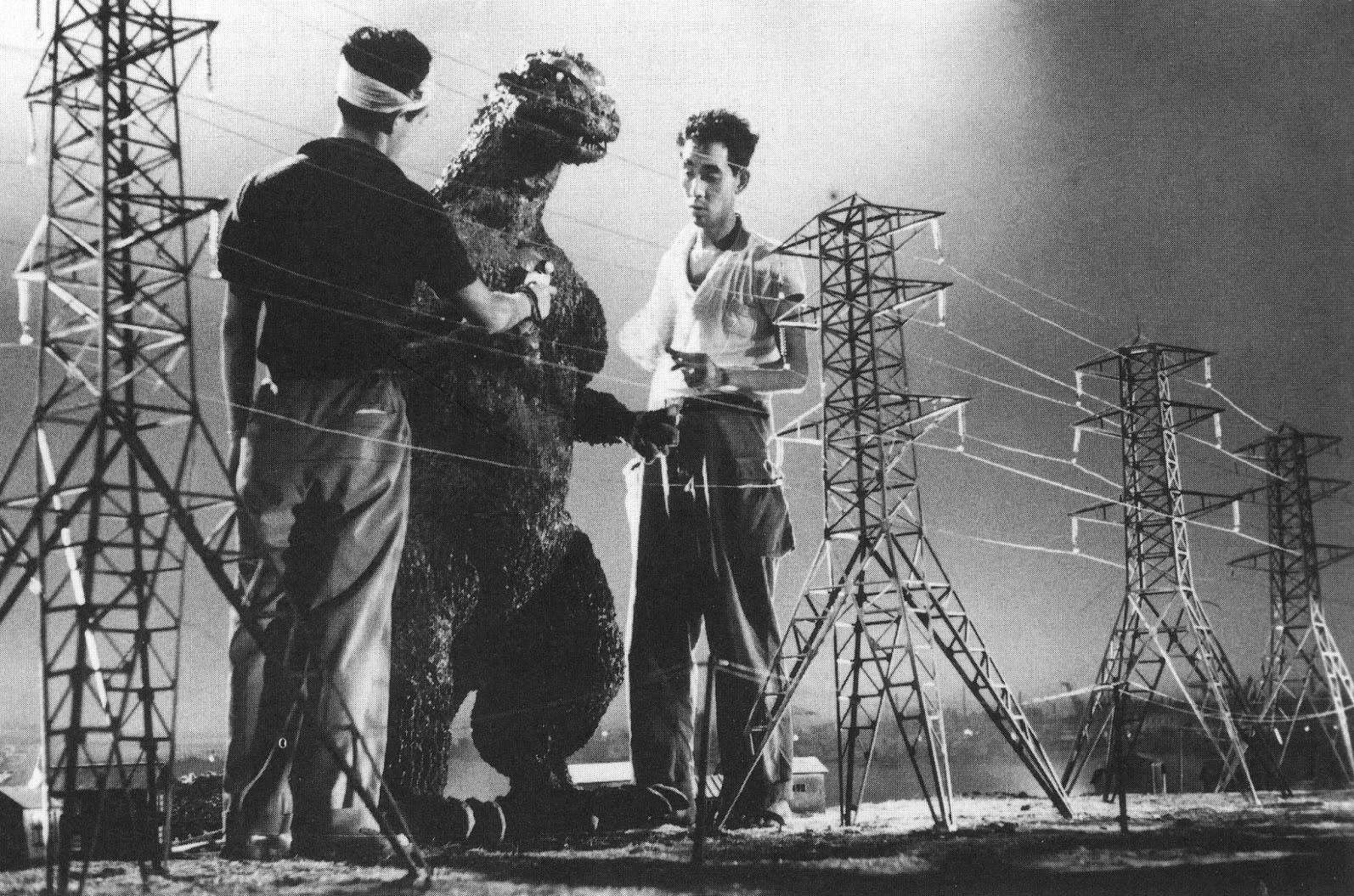
The Godzilla suit was produced with rough materials, resulting in a heavy suit that forced performer Haruo Nakajima only being able to act for three minutes before he would pass out from heat and exhaustion. The miniatures were constructed at certain scales to appear smaller than the suit.

The film's special effects were directed by Eiji Tsuburaya. Part of the reason why Mori approved the film was because he saw it as an opportunity for Toho to reclaim its status as Japan's leading studio in special effects filmmaking. After Tsuburaya launched Toho's special effects division in the late 1930s, he supervised the effects for war dramas financed by the Imperial Japanese Navy. Tsuburaya proved to be such an important figure that he was placed in charge of a factory that produced detailed miniatures used in educational training films on behalf of the Imperial Navy. While Tsuburaya was banned from Japan's film industry during the Occupation of Japan, he was hired back by Mori once the Occupation ended — albeit as a contractor, rather than an employee.

For the effects footage to sync with the live-action footage, Honda and Tsuburaya would develop plans early during development and briefly meet prior to the day's shoot. Kajita would shuttle Tsuburaya to Honda's set to observe how a scene was being shot and where the actors were being positioned. Kajita also ushered Honda to the effects stage to observe how Tsuburaya was shooting certain effects. Honda edited the live-action footage, and he left blank leaders for Tsuburaya to insert the effects footage. At times, Honda had to cut out certain effects footage. Tsuburaya disapproved of these decisions because Honda's cuts did not match the effects; however, Honda had the final say in those matters.

Tsuburaya originally wanted to use stop motion for the film's special effects but realized that it would have taken seven years to complete based on the current staff and infrastructure at Toho. Settling on suitmation and miniature effects, Tsuburaya and his crew scouted the locations that Godzilla was to destroy and was nearly arrested after a security guard overheard their plans for destruction but were released after they showed the police their Toho business cards. Kintaro Makino, the chief of miniature construction, was given blueprints by Akira Watanabe for the miniatures and assigned 30 to 40 workers from the carpentry department to build them, which took a month to build the scaled-down version of Ginza. Most of the miniatures were built at a 1:25 scale, but the Diet Building was scaled down to a 1:33 scale to look smaller than Godzilla. It proved to be too expensive to use stop-motion extensively throughout the picture, but the final film included a stop-motion scene of Godzilla's tail destroying the Nichigeki Theater Building.

The buildings' framework was made of thin wooden boards reinforced with a mixture of plaster and white chalk. Explosives were installed inside miniatures that were to be destroyed by Godzilla's atomic breath. Some were sprayed with gasoline to make them burn more easily; others included small cracks so they could crumble easily. Optical animation techniques were used for Godzilla's glowing dorsal fins by having hundreds of cells, which were drawn frame by frame. Haruo Nakajima perspired inside the suit so much that the Yagi brothers had to dry out the cotton lining every morning and sometimes reline the interior of the suit and repair damages.

The typhoon waves were created by stagehands who overturned barrels of water into a water tank where the miniature Odo Island shoreline was built. Multiple composition shots were used for the Odo Island scenes. Most of the Odo Island scenes were filmed near rice fields. Toho hired en masse part-time employees to work on the film's optical effects. Half of the 400 hired staff were mostly part-timers with little to no experience. An early version of Godzilla's full reveal was filmed that featured Godzilla, via hand-operated puppet, devouring a cow. Sadamasa Arikawa thought the scene was too gruesome and convinced Tsuburaya to refilm it. Optical effects were utilized for Godzilla's footprints on the beach by painting them onto glass and inserting them into an area of the live-action footage. Special effects photography lasted for 71 days.

=== Filming ===
On the first day of filming, Honda addressed a crew of 30 to read the script and to leave the project if they did not feel convinced since he wanted to work only with those who had confidence in him and the film. Most of the film was shot in the Toho lot. Honda's team also filmed on location in the Shima Peninsula in Mie Prefecture to film the Odo Island scenes, which used 50 Toho extras, and Honda's team established their base in the town of Toba. Local villagers were also used as extras for the Odo Island scenes. The dance ritual scene was filmed on location in Mie Prefecture, with local villagers performing as the dancers. The cast and crew commuted every morning by boat to Toba, Mie, and worked under harsh weather temperatures. Honda worked shirtless and so suffered a blistering sunburn on his back that left permanent scars.

Toho had negotiated with the Japan Self-Defense Forces (JSDF) to film scenes requiring the military and filmed target practices and drills for the film. Honda's team followed a convoy of JSDF vehicles for the convoy dispatch scene. Two thousand girls were used from an all-girls high school for the prayer-for-peace scene. The filmmakers had little co-operation from the JSDF and had to rely on World War II stock footage, provided by the Japanese military, for certain scenes. The stock footage was sourced from 16 mm prints. Honda's team spent 51 days shooting the film.

== Music and sound effects ==
The film's score was composed by Akira Ifukube. After meeting with Tomoyuki Tanaka, Eiji Tsuburaya, and Ishirō Honda, Ifukube enthusiastically accepted the job. After learning that the main character was a monster, Ifukube said, "I couldn't sit still when I heard that in this movie the main character was a reptile that would be rampaging through the city." Ifukube was not shown the final film and had only a week to compose his music. Within that time, he was shown only a model of Godzilla and the screenplay. Tsuburaya briefly showed Ifukube some footage but with the effects missing and Tsuburaya attempted to describe how the scene would unfold. Ifukube recalled, "I was very confused. So I tried to make music that would remind you of something enormous." Ifukube used low-pitch brass and string instruments.

It was Honda's idea to make Godzilla roar. Shimonaga and Minawa were originally tasked with creating the roar, but Ifukube became involved after taking an interest in creating sound effects. Ifukube and Honda discussed what type of sounds were going to be used in certain scenes and other details concerning sounds. Minawa went to the zoo and recorded various animal roars and played them back at certain speeds. However, the sounds proved unsatisfactory and went unused. Ifukube borrowed a double bass from the Japan Art University's music department and created Godzilla's roar by loosening the strings and rubbing them with a leather glove. The sound was recorded and played at a reduced speed, which achieved the effect of the roar used in the film. The technique would be adopted by Toho as a standard method in creating monster roars in the following years.

There are conflicting reports as to how Godzilla's footsteps were created. One claim states that they were created with a knotted rope hitting a kettle drum that was recorded and processed through an echo box. Some Japanese texts claim that the footsteps were sourced from an explosion with the ending clipped off and processed through an electronic reverb unit. However, Ifukube told Cult Movies that the footsteps were created using a primitive amplifier that made a loud clap when struck. The optical recording equipment contained four audio tracks: one for principal dialogue, one for background chatter, ambient noises, tanks, planes, and one for the roars and footsteps. An independent audio track was used to prevent bleeding over other audio.

The music and sound effects of Godzilla's rampage were recorded live simultaneously. While Ifukube conducted the NHK Philharmonic Orchestra, foley artists watched Godzilla's rampage projected on a screen and used tin, concrete debris, wood, and other equipment to simulate sounds that would sync with the footage. A new take would be needed if the foley artist had missed a cue. Many of Ifukube's themes and motifs associated with Godzilla were introduced in the film, such as the March, the Horror theme, and the Requiem. The "Self Defense Force March" had become so synonymous with Godzilla that Ifukube later referred to it as "Godzilla's theme." Ifukube considered his music for the film his finest film score.

== Release ==
=== Marketing ===
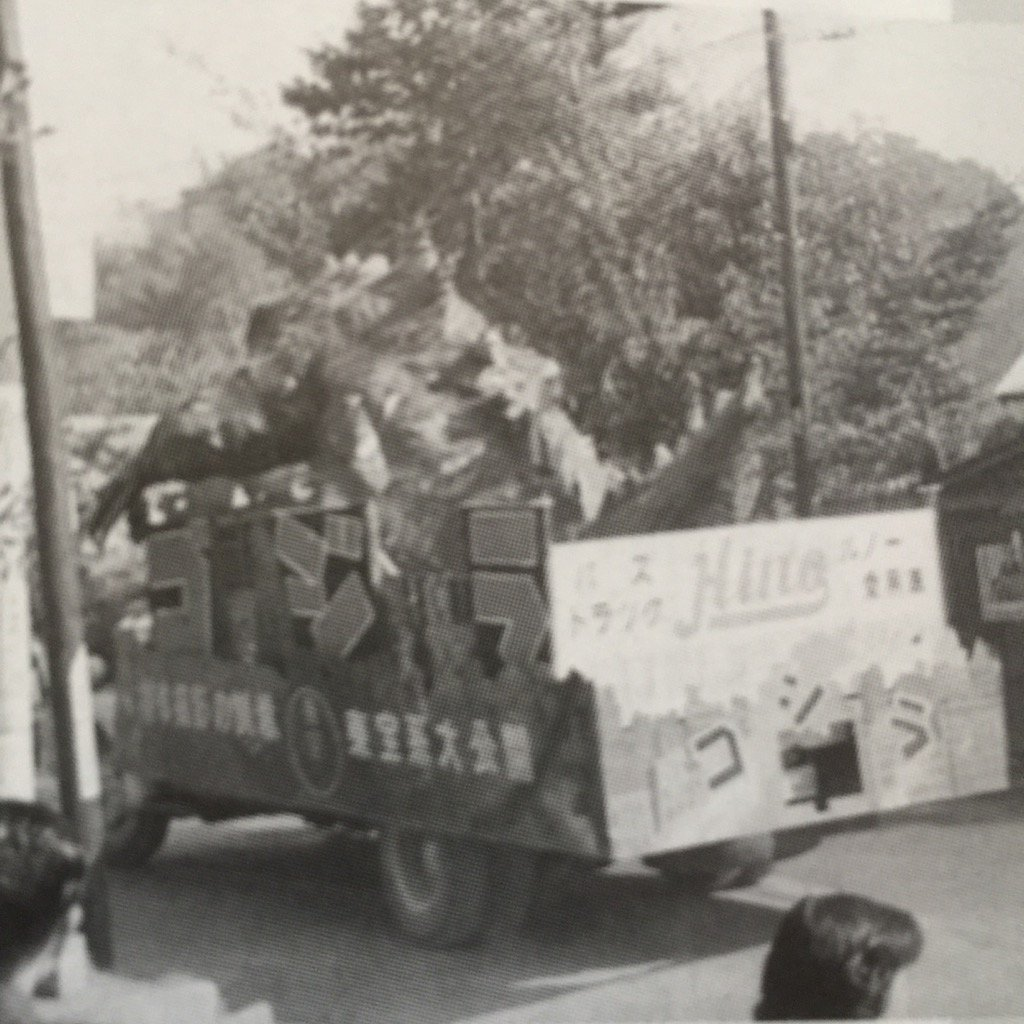
As part of the film's marketing strategy, Toho hired trucks with a model of Godzilla mounted in the back and driven around Tokyo.

During production, Mori devised promotional strategies to generate public interest such as a radio play, Monster Godzilla (怪獣ゴジラ, Kaijū Gojira); 11 episodes were produced based on the screenplay and were aired on Saturdays on the NHK radio network from July 17 to September 25, 1954.

In an attempt to build mystery, Mori banned reporters from the set and kept the special effects techniques and other behind-the-scenes crafts secret. Nakajima's suit performance as Godzilla would not be revealed until the 1960s. However, Godzilla's image was widely publicized. Godzilla's image was added to the company stationery, cut-out pictures and posters were displayed in theaters and stores, large advertisement balloons were flown to major Japanese cities, and a Godzilla doll was mounted onto a truck and driven around Tokyo. The film's theatrical trailer debuted in theaters on October 20, 1954.

=== Theatrical ===
Godzilla was first released in Nagoya on October 27, 1954, and released nationwide on November 3, 1954. At the time of the film's release, it set a new opening day record for any Toho film by selling 33,000 tickets at Toho's cinemas in Tokyo and selling out at Nichigeki Theater. As a result, Toho's CEO personally called Honda to congratulate him. Honda's wife, Kimi, commented "That sort of thing didn't usually happen." An 84-minute cut of the Japanese version was theatrically released in West Germany on April 10, 1956, as Godzilla. That version removes the Japanese Diet argument, the acknowledgment of Godzilla as a "child of the H-bomb," references to Hiroshima and Nagasaki, and an altered translation of the mother holding her children.

From 1955 to the 1960s, Godzilla played in theaters catering to Japanese-Americans in predominantly Japanese neighborhoods in the United States. In the summer of 1982, an English-subtitled version was shown at film festivals and art house cinemas in New York, Chicago, and other U.S. cities, including The Film Center of the School of the Art Institute of Chicago, where it was screened in late August of that year. Later that year, the film was re-released theatrically in Japan on November 21, to commemorate Toho's 50th anniversary. Since its release, the 1954 film remained unavailable officially in the United States until 2004.

To coincide with the film's 50th anniversary, art-house distributor Rialto Pictures gave the film a traveling tour-style limited release, coast-to-coast, across the United States, on May 7, 2004. It ran uncut with English subtitles until December 19, 2004. The film never played on more than six screens at any given point during its limited release. The film played in roughly sixty theaters and cities across the United States during its 7 1/2-month release. In October 2005, the British Film Institute theatrically released the Japanese version in the United Kingdom.

On April 18, 2014, Rialto re-released the film in the United States, coast-to-coast, using another limited-style traveling tour. That coincided with Godzilla's 60th anniversary but also celebrated the American Godzilla film, which was released that same year. To avoid confusion with the Hollywood feature, the Rialto release was subtitled The Japanese Original. It was screened in 66 theaters in 64 cities from April 18 to October 31, 2014.

For its 67th anniversary, a 4K remaster of the film, along with other Godzilla films, was screened in Alamo Drafthouse Cinema locations on November 3, 2021.

In 2008, images surfaced online of posters for an alleged unofficial Filipino remake of the film titled Tokyo 1960; purportedly directed by Teodorico C. Santos and starring Tessie Quintana and Eddie del Mar. However, the supposed film's existence has not been verified by Toho or other official parties, and no videos or screenings have ever surfaced.

=== American version ===
After the film's success in Japan, Toho sold the American rights to Joseph E. Levine for $25,000. A heavily altered version of the film was released in the United States and worldwide as Godzilla, King of the Monsters! on April 27, 1956. This version trimmed the original down to 80 minutes and featured new footage with Canadian actor Raymond Burr interacting with body doubles mixed with Honda's footage to make it seem as if he were part of the original Japanese production. Many of the film's political themes were trimmed or removed completely. It was this version of the original Godzilla film that introduced audiences worldwide to the character and franchise and the only version to which critics and scholars had access until 2004 when the 1954 film was released in select theaters in North America. Godzilla, King of the Monsters! grossed $2 million during its theatrical run, more than what the 1954 film grossed in Japan.

Honda was unaware that Godzilla had been re-edited until Toho released Godzilla, King of the Monsters! in Japan in May 1957 as Monster King Godzilla. Toho converted the entire film from its original scope to a widescreen 2.35:1 scope, which resulted in an awkward crop for the entire film. Japanese subtitles were given to the Japanese actors since their original dialogue differed greatly from the original script and were dubbed in English. Since the release of the film, Toho has adopted the epithet "King of the Monsters" for Godzilla, which has since appeared in official marketing, advertisement, and promotional materials.

== Home media ==
=== Japan ===
In 1985, the Japanese version of Godzilla was released on LaserDisc in Japan by Toho, followed by a VHS release in 1988. Toho released the film on DVD in 2001 and on Blu-ray in 2009. In 2008, Toho remastered the film in high-definition and premiered it on the Japanese Movie Speciality Channel, along with the rest of the Godzilla films that were also remastered in HD.

In March 2021, Toho premiered a 4K remaster of the film on the Nippon Classic Movie Channel, along with seven other Godzilla films also remastered in 4K. The 4K remaster, which uses two dupe negatives made in the 1970s and a fine-grain positive print (the best remaining elements), was downscaled to 2K for broadcast and released on 4K Blu-ray in October 2023.

In June 2025, a man from Osaka was arrested for selling 1,500 unauthorized DVDs of an AI-colorized version of Godzilla. He had advertised the products as being "legal" when selling them on flea market sites between January and May 2025, profiting around ¥1.7 million.

=== International ===
The American version was released on VHS and DVD by Simitar Entertainment in 1998 and Classic Media in 2002. In 2005, the British Film Institute released the Japanese version on DVD in the United Kingdom that includes the original mono track and several extra features, such as documentaries and commentary tracks by film historians Steve Ryfle, Ed Godziszewski, and Keith Aiken. The DVD also includes a documentary about the Daigo Fukuryū Maru, a Japanese fishing boat that was caught in an American nuclear blast and partially inspired the creation of the film.

In 2006, Classic Media released the Japanese and American versions on a two-disc DVD in the United States and Canada. This release features trailers and audio commentaries for both films by Ryfle and Godziszewski (separate from the BFI commentaries), two 13-minute documentaries titled "Godzilla Story Development" and "Making of the Godzilla Suit," and a 12-page essay booklet by Ryfle. This release also restores the original ending credits of the American film, which hitherto was thought to have been lost. Classic Media would re-issue the Japanese version on Blu-ray in 2009 and both cuts of the film on DVD in 2014; the latter was released to coincide with Legendary Pictures' Godzilla film.

In 2012, The Criterion Collection released a "new high-definition digital restoration" of Godzilla on Blu-ray and DVD. This release, which uses a 1983 print sourced from one of the dupe negatives, includes a remaster of the American version, Godzilla, King of the Monsters!, as well as other special features such as interviews with Akira Ikufube, Japanese film critic Tadao Sato, actor Akira Takarada, Godzilla performer Haruo Nakajima, effects technicians Yoshio Irie and Eizo Kaimai and audio commentaries on both films by film historian David Kalat. Criterion re-released the film on 4K Blu-ray on November 5, 2024.

In 2017, Janus Films and the Criterion Collection streamed both cuts of the film, as well as other Godzilla titles, on Starz and FilmStruck. In 2019, both cuts were included in the Blu-ray box set Godzilla: The Showa Era Films, released by the Criterion Collection; it featured all 15 films from the franchise's Shōwa era. In May 2020, the Japanese and American version became available on HBO Max upon its launch.

== Reception ==
=== Box office ===
During its initial Japanese theatrical run, the film set an opening record with the highest first-day ticket sales in Tokyo, before it went on to sell 9.69 million tickets; it was the eighth best-attended film in Japan that year. The film earned ¥183 million (just under $510,000) in distributor rentals during its initial run, with total lifetime gross receipts of $2.25 million. Adjusted for inflation, the film's original Japanese box office run in 1954 was equivalent to ¥13.7 billion in 1998.

During its 2004 limited theatrical release in North America, the film grossed $38,030 on its opening weekend and grossed $412,520 by the end of its limited run. For the 2014 limited re-release in North America, it grossed $10,903 after playing in one theater in New York and grossed $150,191 at the end of its run. In the United Kingdom, the film sold 3,643 tickets from limited releases in 2005–2006 and 2016–2017.

=== Critical response in Japan ===
Before the release of the film, skeptics predicted the film would flop. At the time of the film's release, Japanese reviews were mixed. Japanese critics accused the film of exploiting the widespread devastation that the country had suffered in World War II, as well as the Daigo Fukuryū Maru incident, which occurred a few months before filming began. Ishiro Honda lamented years later in the Tokyo Journal, "They called it grotesque junk and said it looked like something you'd spit up. I felt sorry for my crew because they had worked so hard!"

Others said that depicting a fire-breathing organism was strange. Honda also believed that Japanese critics began to change their minds after the good reviews the film received in the United States: "The first film critics to appreciate Godzilla were those in the U.S. When Godzilla was released there as Godzilla, King of the Monsters! in 1956, the critics said such things as, 'For the start, this film frankly depicts the horrors of the Atomic Bomb', and by these evaluations, the assessment began to impact critics in Japan and has changed their opinions over the years."

As time went on, the film gained more respect in its home country. In 1984, Kinema Junpo magazine listed Godzilla as one of the top 20 Japanese films of all time, and a survey of 370 Japanese film critics published in Nihon Eiga Besuto 150 (Best 150 Japanese Films), had Godzilla ranked as the 27th best Japanese film ever made. The film was nominated for two Japanese Movie Association awards: one for best special effects and the other for best film. It won best special effects but lost best picture to Akira Kurosawa's Seven Samurai. Kurosawa later listed the film as one of his 100 favorite films.

Noriaki Yuasa, director of several Gamera films, criticized the film for its inaccurate depictions of post-war casualties, calling it “outrageous.”

=== Critical response overseas ===
Godzilla has received mostly positive reviews from Western critics. On the review aggregator website Rotten Tomatoes, 94% of 78 critics' reviews are positive, with an average rating of 7.7/10. The website's consensus reads: "More than straight monster-movie fare, Gojira offers potent, sobering postwar commentary." Metacritic, which uses a weighted average, assigned the film a score of 79 out of 100, based on 20 critics, indicating "generally favorable" reviews.

Owen Gleiberman from Entertainment Weekly found the film more "serious" than the 1956 American version but sometimes seemed to drift towards the B movie tone of films like Them! Luke Y. Thompson from Dallas Observer defended the film's effects as products of their time and felt that viewers would be "surprised by what they see." He stated, "This ain't your standard goofy monster rampage." Peter Bradshaw from The Guardian awarded the film four stars out of five, praising the storytelling as "muscular" and the "passion" behind its nuclear themes, that the films fervor transcends it past retrospective and contemporary blockbusters. Slant Magazine's Budd Wilkins gave the movie a perfect rating, stating, "Decades of sequels, tag-team monster mash-ups, and shitty Hollywood remakes have not blunted the sheer cinematographic force, let alone metaphorical heft, of Honda Ishirô’s Godzilla. Rarely has the open wound of widespread devastation been transposed to celluloid with greater visceral impact. Put another way, Godzilla is the Germany Year Zero of monster movies."

Keith Uhlich from Time Out awarded the film four stars out of five, praising the film's characters, themes, and Godzilla itself as relevant metaphor for the atomic age. Desson Thomson from the Washington Post called the film's effects "pretty extraordinary" and "amazingly credible" for their time, but felt the acting seemed melodramatic at times. Mick LaSalle from the San Francisco Chronicle called the film a "classic," stating that the film transcends its own metaphors with its relevant social commentary.

Conversely, Roger Ebert from the Chicago Sun-Times was negative; giving the film one-and-a-half stars out of four, feeling that the original Japanese version is no different from the poor quality of the 1956 American version. Ebert criticized the effects for looking "crude" and found the effects of 1933's King Kong to be more convincing.

=== Accolades ===
Award	Date of Ceremony	Category	Recipient(s)	Result	Ref(s)
International Film Music Critics Association	February 25, 2017	Best Re-Release or Re-Recording of an Existing Score	Akira Ifukube, Kaoru Wada, and Masaru Hayakawa	Nominated	
Japan Film Technological Awards	1954	Special Skill	Eiji Tsuburaya	Won	
Rondo Hatton Classic Horror Awards	March 24, 2007	Best Classic DVD	Godzilla	Won	
Rondo Hatton Classic Horror Awards	April 13, 2013	Best Commentary	David Kalat	Won	
Rondo Hatton Classic Horror Awards	April 13, 2013	Best Classic DVD	Godzilla (Criterion Blu-Ray)	Nominated	
Saturn Awards	May 10, 2007	Best Classic Film DVD Release	Godzilla	Won	
Saturn Awards	June 24, 2008	Best DVD Collection	"The Godzilla Collection"	Nominated	

== Legacy ==
Since its release, Godzilla has been regarded as one of the best giant monster films ever made, and critic Allen Perkins called the film "not just a classic monster movie, but also an important cinematic achievement." The film has appeared in several contemporary media outlets's lists ranking the best (science fiction, monster, or foreign) films ever made. (Note: Attributed to multiple sources.) In 2017, the Visual Effects Society added the 1954 film amongst their list of seventy most influential films in visual effects of all time.

The film spawned a multimedia franchise consisting of 38 films in total, video games, books, comics, toys, and other media. The Godzilla franchise has been recognized by Guinness World Records as being the longest-running film franchise in history. Since his debut, Godzilla became an international pop culture icon, inspiring countless rip-offs, imitations, parodies and tributes. The 1954 film and its special effects director Eiji Tsuburaya have been largely credited for establishing the template for tokusatsu, a technique of practical special effects filmmaking that would become essential in Japan's film industry after the release of Godzilla. Critic and scholar Ryusuke Hikawa said: "Disney created the template for American animation. In the same way, (special-effects studio) Tsuburaya created the template for the Japanese movie business. It was their use of cheap but craftsman-like approaches to movie-making that made tokusatsu unique." Tsuburaya would later reuse footage of Godzilla from the film for the first episode of Kaiju Booska (1966–1967).

Steven Spielberg cited Godzilla as an inspiration for Jurassic Park (1993), specifically the 1956 American localization Godzilla, King of the Monsters!, which he grew up watching. Jason Notte of HuffPost credited Godzilla, King of the Monsters! for heralding foreign films to a wider Western audience, declaring it "the most important foreign film in American history."

=== American films ===
In 1998, TriStar Pictures released a reboot, titled Godzilla, directed by Roland Emmerich. Emmerich wanted his Godzilla to have nothing to do with Toho's Godzilla but chose to retain key elements from the 1954 film, stating, "We took part of [the original movie's] basic storyline, in that the creature becomes created by radiation and it becomes a big challenge. But that's all we took."

In 2014, Warner Bros. and Legendary Pictures released a reboot, also titled Godzilla, directed by Gareth Edwards. Edwards stated that his film was inspired by the 1954 film, and attempted to retain some of its themes, stating, "Godzilla is a metaphor for Hiroshima in the original movie. We tried to keep that, and there are a lot of themes from the '54 movie that we've kept."

== See also ==
- List of cult films
