= List of Undertale concerts =

Undertale concerts
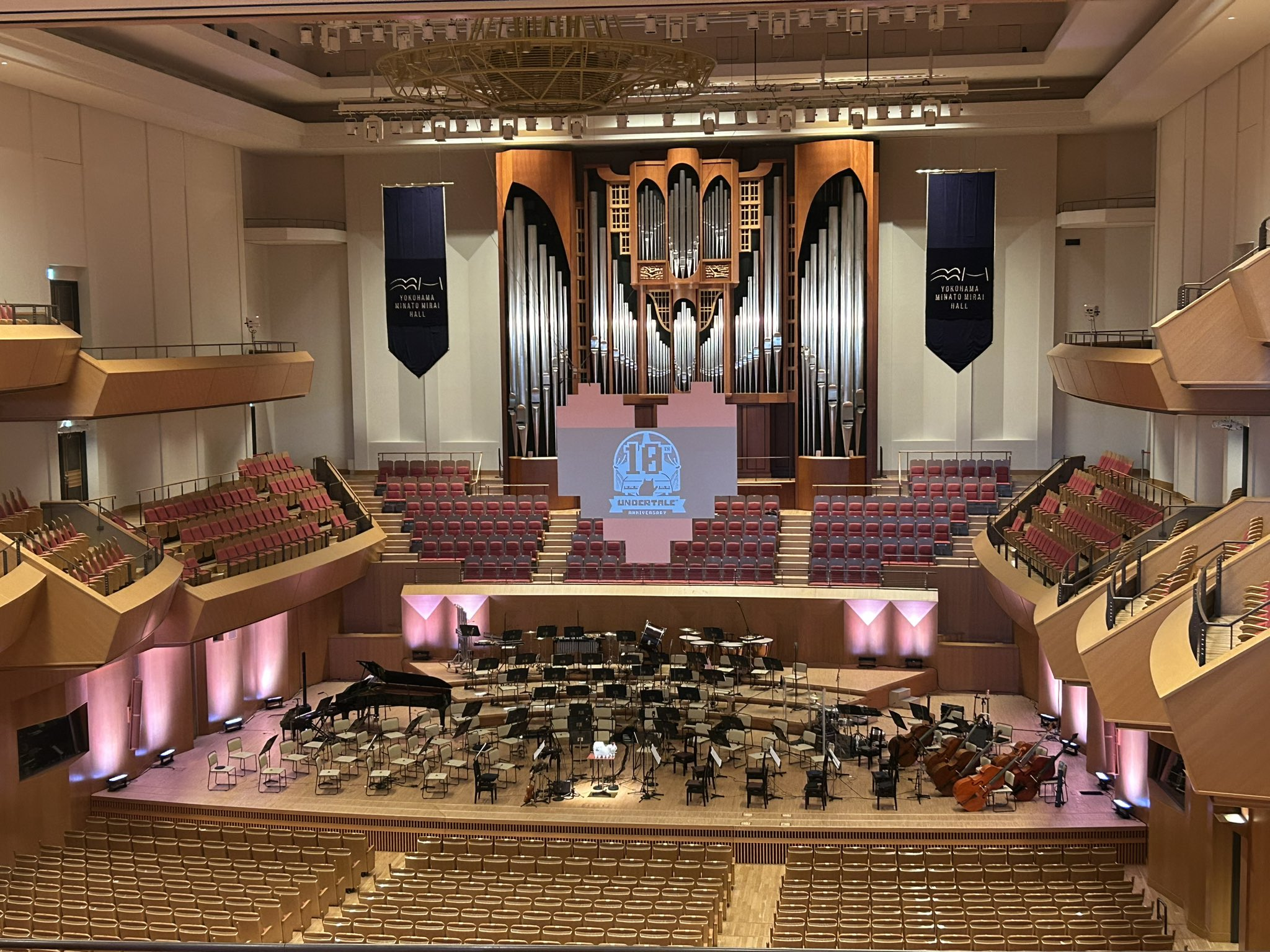
- Inside the Undertale 10th anniversary concert in Japan
- Tours: 4
- Single concerts: 2
- First event: MUSIC Engine Japan; May 6, 2019
- Last event: The Determination Symphony; February 28, 2027

Undertale is a 2015 role-playing video game developed by Toby Fox. Its soundtrack, also composed by Fox, was highly acclaimed by critics and has been performed by various symphonies. The first of these concerts was held by Music Engine Japan on May 6, 2019, at Suntory Hall in Tokyo, with a second performance held that July at The Symphony Hall in Osaka. AWR Music Productions later held Undertale Live, a single-concert event performed by the Fifth House Ensemble at the Studebaker Theater in Chicago on January 11, 2020, in which audience voting shaped the performance.

Nippon Columbia held the Undertale Symphonic Concert Tour 2024, which was toured across Japan from March 2024 through an encore run ending in May 2025. A standalone Undertale tenth-anniversary concert was held at the Eventim Apollo in London on June 22, 2025, produced by Lambert Jackson Productions, while a separate Undertale 10th Anniversary Concert tour ran across Japan from September 2025 to May 2026. The most extensive tour to date, Undertale: The Determination Symphony, is currently being produced by Lambert Jackson Productions and Materia Music. The tour began on August 23, 2026 in San Jose, California, and is scheduled to end in Glasgow on February 28, 2027.

== Single concerts ==
=== Undertale Live (2020) ===
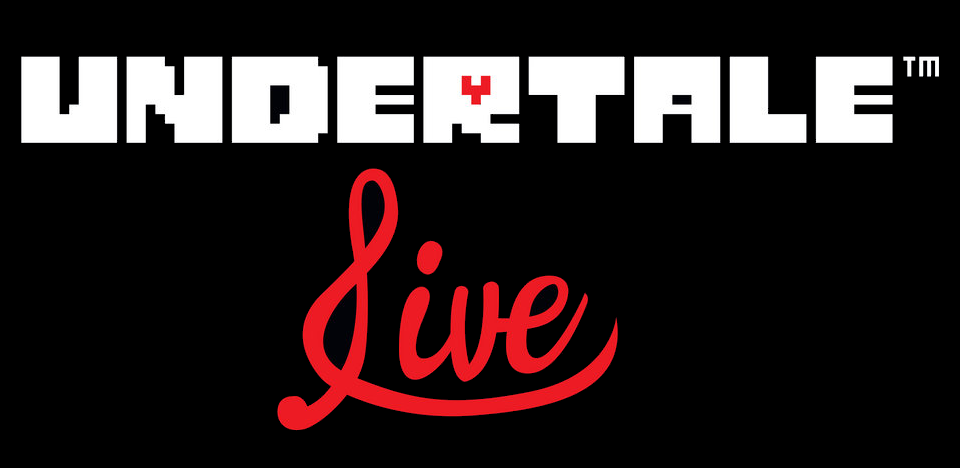
Undertale Live logo

Undertale Live was a one-day event that took place on January 11, 2020 at the Studebaker Theater in Chicago, Illinois. It was produced by AWR Music Productions, and the show was performed by the Fifth House Ensemble.

Undertale Live
Date	City	Country	Venue	Ref.
January 11, 2020	Chicago	United States	Studebaker Theater	

=== Undertale London 10th Anniversary Concert (2025) ===
Inside the Undertale concert in London

This concert was performed on June 22, 2025 at the Eventim Apollo in London as a single-concert event tied to the game's tenth anniversary. Due to high demand following the initial announcement, Lambert Jackson Productions added a matinee performance for the same date, with tickets for the additional show going on sale on April 23, 2025.

Undertale London 10th Anniversary Concert
Date	City	Country	Venue	Ref.
June 22, 2025	London	United Kingdom	Eventim Apollo	

== Tours ==
=== MUSIC Engine Seventh Concert (2019) ===
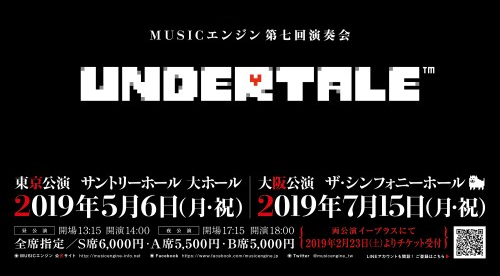
The Undertale Music Engine 2019 logo

The MUSIC Engine Seventh Concert (Note: Japanese: MUSICエンジン 第七回演奏会, Hepburn: MUSIC enjin dainanakai ensoukai) was the first series of live orchestral performances featuring the music from Undertale. The concert was first performed on May 6, 2019 at the Suntory Hall in Tokyo, and a second time at The Symphony Hall in Osaka on July 15.

A remastered video recording of the May afternoon performance was aired by Fangamer and 8-4 as the Undertale 5th Anniversary Concert online in September 2020.

MUSIC Engine Seventh Concert
Date	City	Country	Venue	Ref.
May 6, 2019	Tokyo	Japan	Suntory Hall	
July 15, 2019	Osaka	Japan	The Symphony Hall	

=== Undertale Symphonic Concert Tour 2024 (2024–2025) ===
The Undertale Symphonic Concert Tour 2024 (Note: Japanese: 『アンダーテイル』シンフォニック・コンサート・ツアー 2024, Hepburn: Andāteiru Shinfonikko Konsāto Tsuā Nisen-nijūyon) was a series of orchestral concert performances. Organized by Nippon Columbia and directed by Masaki Yamamoto of Metroberry, the tour commenced on March 9, 2024, at the Tokyo Opera City Concert Hall. Following its initial success across nine Japanese cities, the production expanded through 2025 into sub-tours designated as "Encore" and "Extended," concluding its final performances in May 2025.

==== Initial run (2024) ====
Symphonice Concert Tour 2024
Date	City	Country	Venue	Ref.
March 9, 2024	Tokyo	Japan	Tokyo Opera City Concert Hall (Takemitsu Memorial)	
March 16, 2024	Tokyo	Japan	Tokyo Opera City Concert Hall (Takemitsu Memorial)	
April 20, 2024	Tokyo	Japan	Tokyo Opera City Concert Hall (Takemitsu Memorial)	
April 21, 2024	Tokyo	Japan	Tokyo Opera City Concert Hall (Takemitsu Memorial)	
May 26, 2024	Fukuoka	Japan	ACROS Fukuoka Symphony Hall	
June 7, 2024	Hyogo	Japan	Amagasaki Amashin Archaic Hall	
June 8, 2024	Hyogo	Japan	Amagasaki Amashin Archaic Hall	
July 13, 2024	Hiroshima	Japan	Hiroshima Ueno Gakuen Hall	
August 31, 2024	Osaka	Japan	The Symphony Hall	
September 1, 2024	Kyoto	Japan	Kyoto Concert Hall	
September 15, 2024	Tokyo	Japan	Sumida Triphony Hall	
September 16, 2024	Tokyo	Japan	Sumida Triphony Hall	

==== Osaka encore reprising (2025) ====
Symphonic Concert Tour Osaka reprise
Date	City	Country	Venue	Ref.
January 18, 2025	Osaka	Japan	The Symphony Hall	
January 19, 2025	Osaka	Japan	The Symphony Hall	
March 29, 2025	Nagoya	Japan	Aichi Prefectural Art Theater Concert Hall	
April 5, 2025	Sapporo	Japan	Sapporo Concert Hall Kitara (Main Hall)	
May 4, 2025	Tokorozawa	Japan	Tokorozawa Civic Cultural Center Muse Arc Hall	

=== Undertale 10th Anniversary Concert (2025–2026) ===
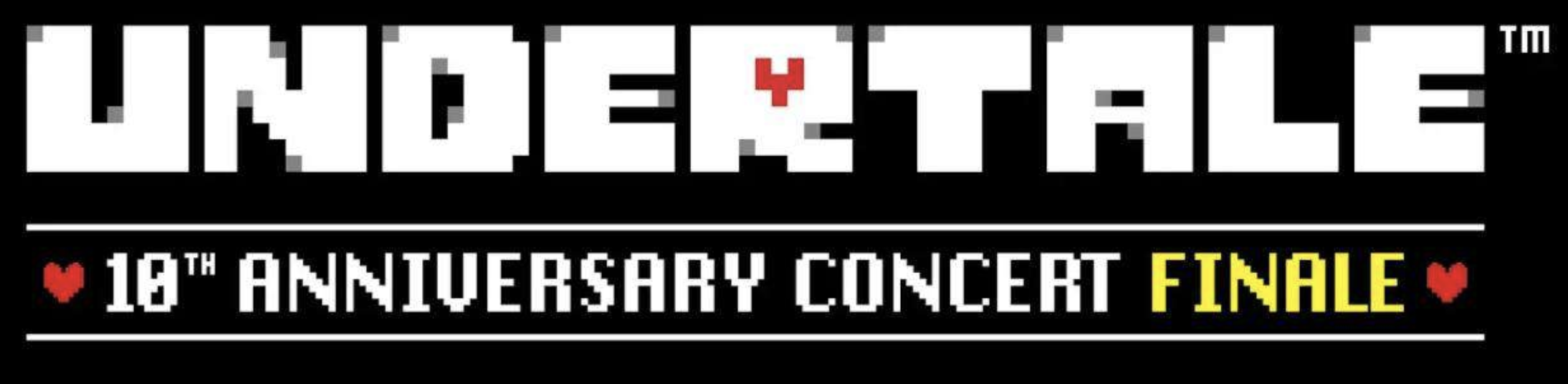
Logo of the finale leg of the Undertale 10th Anniversary concert

Japanese prefectures covered in the Undertale 10th Anniversary Concert tour

The Undertale 10th Anniversary Concert was a concert tour held exclusively in Japan from September 13, 2025, to May 29, 2026. It was organized to celebrate the tenth anniversary of the game. The performances were primarily executed by the Japanese orchestra MUSIC Engine, which previously performed the game's fifth anniversary concert in 2020. The concert series concluded with a multi-city "Finale" leg in April and May 2026, which introduced alternate programs and culminated in a final show in Tokyo.

Undertale 10th Anniversary Concert series
Date	City	Country	Venue	Ref.
September 13, 2025	Osaka	Japan	Orix Theater	
September 14, 2025	Osaka	Japan	Orix Theater	
September 15, 2025	Osaka	Japan	Orix Theater	
October 12, 2025	Tokyo	Japan	Bunkyo Civic Hall	
October 13, 2025	Yokohama	Japan	Minato Mirai Hall	
November 3, 2025	Tokyo	Japan	Suntory Hall	
December 27, 2025	Sendai	Japan	Hitachi Systems Hall Sendai	
January 2, 2026	Osaka	Japan	Festival Hall	
January 3, 2026	Osaka	Japan	Festival Hall	
January 4, 2026	Fukuoka	Japan	Fukuoka Civic Hall	
January 10, 2026	Tokyo	Japan	Fuchu no Mori Art Theatre (Dream Hall)	
February 14, 2026	Tokyo	Japan	Tokyo Metropolitan Theatre (Valentine's Special Program)	
February 23, 2026	Hiroshima	Japan	Hiroshima Bunka Gakuen HBG Hall	
March 13, 2026	Sapporo	Japan	Sapporo Concert Hall Kitara (Main Hall)	
March 14, 2026	Sapporo	Japan	Sapporo Concert Hall Kitara (Main Hall)	
April 5, 2026	Chiba	Japan	Chiba Prefectural Cultural Hall	
May 2, 2026	Mishima	Japan	Mishima City Cultural Hall	
May 4, 2026	Osaka	Japan	NHK Osaka Hall	
May 5, 2026	Osaka	Japan	NHK Osaka Hall	
May 9, 2026	Nanyo	Japan	Shelter Nanyo Hall	
May 16, 2026	Kanazawa	Japan	Kanazawa Kagekiza	
May 24, 2026	Toyota	Japan	Toyota City Cultural Hall	
May 29, 2026	Tokyo	Japan	SGC Hall Ariake	

=== The Determination Symphony (2026–2027) ===
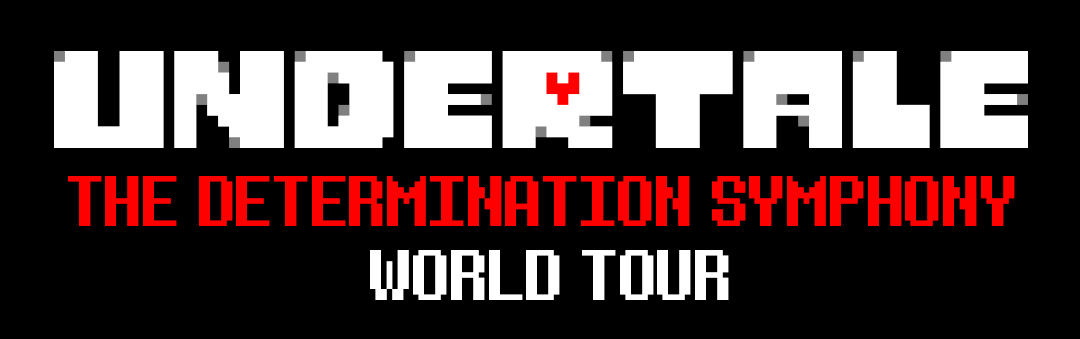
The Determination Symphony logo

Countries Covered By The Undertale Determination Symphony World Tour

U.S. states and the District of Columbia that are covered by The Determination Symphony tour

Undertale: The Determination Symphony is an live orchestral concert tour. The tour features live orchestral arrangements by British orchestrator Adam Hoskins of music from the Undertale soundtrack, composed by Toby Fox. Beginning on August 23, 2026 in San Jose, California, the tour spans two legs and includes over 70 shows across North America, Europe, Asia, and Australia, concluding on February 28, 2027, in Glasgow, United Kingdom.

†	This concert has two performances; an afternoon and an evening show.

The Determination Symphony series
Date	City	Country	Venue	Ref.
August 23, 2026 †	San Jose	United States	San Jose Civic	
August 27, 2026	Los Angeles	United States	Greek Theatre	
August 28, 2026	Los Angeles	United States	Greek Theatre	
August 30, 2026	Toronto	Canada	Sobeys Stadium	
September 1, 2026	Kansas City	United States	Kauffman Center for the Performing Arts	
September 2, 2026	Kansas City	United States	Kauffman Center for the Performing Arts	
September 2, 2026	Cedar Park (Note: Labelled as Austin in promotion material)	United States	H-E-B Center at Cedar Park	
September 3, 2026	Fishers (Note: Labelled as Indianapolis in promotion material)	United States	Fishers Event Center	
September 4, 2026	Dallas	United States	AT&T Performing Arts Center	
September 5, 2026 †	Chicago	United States	Auditorium Theatre	
September 6, 2026	Denver	United States	Denver Performing Arts Complex	
September 6, 2026	Dallas	United States	AT&T Performing Arts Center	
September 6, 2026	Calgary	Canada	Southern Alberta Jubilee Auditorium	
September 8, 2026	Salt Lake City	United States	Eccles Theater	
September 15, 2026	Cleveland	United States	Playhouse Square	
September 19, 2026 †	Boston	United States	Boch Center	
September 20, 2026 †	Philadelphia	United States	Kimmel Center for the Performing Arts	
September 21, 2026	Rotterdam	Netherlands	De Doelen	
September 21, 2026	Singapore		Esplanade – Theatres on the Bay	
September 22, 2026	Singapore		Esplanade – Theatres on the Bay	
September 22, 2026	Paris	France	Salle Pleyel	
September 23, 2026	Paris	France	Salle Pleyel	
September 24, 2026	Düsseldorf	Germany	Castello	
September 25, 2026	Atlanta	United States	Fox Theatre	
September 25, 2026	Bangkok	Thailand	SiamPic Hall	
September 26, 2026 †	Bangkok	Thailand	SiamPic Hall	
September 26, 2026	Rotterdam	Netherlands	De Doelen	
September 26, 2026 †	London	United Kingdom	Eventim Apollo	
September 27, 2026	Manchester	United Kingdom	O_{2} Apollo Manchester	
September 27, 2026 †	Bangkok	Thailand	SiamPic Hall	
September 28, 2026	Birmingham	United Kingdom	Symphony Hall	
September 28, 2026	Kuala Lumpur	Malaysia	Kuala Lumpur Convention Centre	
September 29, 2026	Seattle	United States	Benaroya Hall	
October 2, 2026	Memphis	United States	Grind City Amphitheater	
October 2, 2026	Milan	Italy	Teatro Dal Verme	
October 4, 2026	Nashville	United States	Ryman Auditorium	
October 4, 2026	Mexico City	Mexico	Teatro Metropólitan	
October 5, 2026	Portland	United States	Arlene Schnitzer Concert Hall	
October 6, 2026	Seattle	United States	Benaroya Hall	
October 8, 2026	Detroit	United States	Fox Theatre	
October 9, 2026	Milan	Italy	Teatro Dal Verme	
October 10, 2026 †	Vancouver	Canada	Queen Elizabeth Theatre	
October 10, 2026	Las Vegas	United States	Resorts World Theatre	
October 11, 2026	Jakarta	Indonesia	Ciputra Artpreneur	
October 12, 2026	Minneapolis	United States	Orpheum Theatre	
October 15, 2026	Milwaukee	United States	Riverside Theater	
October 17, 2026	Makati (Note: Labelled as Manila in promotion material)	Philippines	Proscenium Theater	
October 17, 2026	Omaha	United States	Rose Blumkin Performing Arts Center	
October 18, 2026	Sugar Land (Note: Labelled as Houston in promotion material)	United States	Smart Financial Centre	
October 21, 2026	Richmond	United States	Altria Theater	
October 23, 2026	Charlotte	United States	Ovens Auditorium	
October 24, 2026	Durham	United States	Durham Performing Arts Center	
November 1, 2026 †	Washington, D.C.	United States	The Anthem	
November 1, 2026 †	Kaohsiung	Taiwan	Kaohsiung Cultural Center	
November 3, 2026	St. Louis	United States	The Factory	
November 5, 2026	Melbourne	Australia	Melbourne Convention and Exhibition Centre	
November 5, 2026	Pittsburgh	United States	Benedum Center	
November 5, 2026	Fort Lauderdale	United States	Broward Center for the Performing Arts	
November 7, 2026	Orlando	United States	Walt Disney Theater	
November 7, 2026	Newark	United States	New Jersey Performing Arts Center	
November 11, 2026	Berlin	Germany	Tempodrom	
November 12, 2026	Liverpool	United Kingdom	Liverpool Olympia	
November 13, 2026	Halifax	United Kingdom	Victoria Theatre	
November 14, 2026	Grimsby	United Kingdom	Grimsby Auditorium	
November 14, 2026 †	Mesa	United States	Mesa Arts Center	
November 15, 2026	Newcastle	United Kingdom	O_{2} City Hall	
November 20, 2026	Melbourne	Australia	Melbourne Convention and Exhibition Centre	
November 20, 2026	Montreal	Canada	Théâtre Saint-Denis	
November 21, 2026	Ottawa	Canada	National Arts Centre	
November 27, 2026	Sydney	Australia	TikTok Entertainment Centre	
December 3, 2026	Brisbane	Australia	Brisbane Convention & Exhibition Centre	
January 9, 2027	Edmonton	Canada	Northern Alberta Jubilee Auditorium	
January 16, 2027	Honolulu	United States	Hawaii Theatre	
February 16, 2027	Barcelona	Spain	Paral·lel 62	
February 18, 2027	Madrid	Spain	The Music Station	
February 21, 2027 †	Dublin	Ireland	Bord Gáis Energy Theatre	
February 28, 2027	Glasgow	United Kingdom	Glasgow Royal Concert Hall	
