= UTDR =

UTDR may refer to:

- Ultrasonic time-domain reflectometry, an imaging technique
- Undertale and Deltarune, two video games created by Toby Fox
