= Undertale: The Determination Symphony =

Live orchestral concert tour

- Tour by Toby Fox (composer; curator)
- Logo
- Associated album: Undertale Soundtrack
- Start date: August 23, 2026
- End date: February 28, 2027
- Legs: 2
- No. of shows: 70+
- Website: undertalesymphony.com

Undertale: The Determination Symphony is a live orchestral concert tour celebrating the 10th anniversary of the 2015 role-playing video game Undertale. The tour features live orchestral arrangements of music, by British orchestrator Adam Hoskins, from the Undertale soundtrack, composed by Toby Fox. Beginning on August 23, 2026, in San Jose, California, the tour spans two legs and includes over 70 shows across North America, Europe, Asia, and Australia, concluding on March 12, 2027, in Lima, Peru.

== Tour dates ==
Countries covered by The Determination Symphony tour

U.S. states covered by The Determination Symphony tour, and the District of Columbia

Undertale in Concert marquee at the Eventim Apollo, London

List of 2026 concerts, showing date, city, country, venue
| Date (2026) | City | Country | Venue |
|---|---|---|---|
| August 23 (Note: This date has two showings, an afternoon and an evening show.) | San Jose | United States | San Jose Civic |
| August 27 | Los Angeles | United States | Greek Theatre |
| August 28 | Los Angeles | United States | Greek Theatre |
| August 30 | Toronto | Canada | Sobeys Stadium |
| September 1 | Kansas City | United States | Kauffman Center for the Performing Arts |
| September 2 | Kansas City | United States | Kauffman Center for the Performing Arts |
| September 2 | Cedar Park (Note: Labelled as Austin in promotion material.) | United States | H-E-B Center at Cedar Park |
| September 3 | Fishers (Note: Labelled as Indianapolis in promotion material.) | United States | Fishers Event Center |
| September 4 | Dallas | United States | AT&T Performing Arts Center |
| September 5 | Chicago | United States | Auditorium Theatre |
| September 6 | Denver | United States | Denver Performing Arts Complex |
| September 6 | Dallas | United States | AT&T Performing Arts Center |
| September 6 | Calgary | Canada | Southern Alberta Jubilee Auditorium |
| September 8 | Salt Lake City | United States | Eccles Theater |
| September 15 | Cleveland | United States | Playhouse Square |
| September 19 | Boston | United States | Boch Center |
| September 20 | Philadelphia | United States | Kimmel Center for the Performing Arts |
| September 21 | Rotterdam | Netherlands | De Doelen |
| September 21 | Singapore | | Esplanade – Theatres on the Bay |
| September 22 | Singapore | | Esplanade – Theatres on the Bay |
| September 22 | Paris | France | Salle Pleyel |
| September 23 | Paris | France | Salle Pleyel |
| September 24 | Düsseldorf | Germany | Castello |
| September 25 | Atlanta | United States | Fox Theatre |
| September 25 | Bangkok | Thailand | SiamPic Hall |
| September 26 | Bangkok | Thailand | SiamPic Hall |
| September 26 | Rotterdam | Netherlands | De Doelen |
| September 26 | London | United Kingdom | Eventim Apollo |
| September 27 | Manchester | United Kingdom | O_{2} Apollo Manchester |
| September 27 (Note: This date has two showings, a morning show and an afternoon show.) | Bangkok | Thailand | SiamPic Hall |
| September 28 | Birmingham | United Kingdom | Symphony Hall |
| September 28 | Kuala Lumpur | Malaysia | Kuala Lumpur Convention Centre |
| September 29 | Seattle | United States | Benaroya Hall |
| September 30 | Nanjing | China | Nanjing Poly Grand Theatre |
| October 1 | Nanjing | China | Nanjing Poly Grand Theatre |
| October 2 | Shanghai | China | Shangyin Opera House |
| October 2 | Memphis | United States | Grind City Amphitheater |
| October 2 | Milan | Italy | Teatro Dal Verme |
| October 3 | Shanghai | China | Shangyin Opera House |
| October 4 | Nashville | United States | Ryman Auditorium |
| October 4 | Mexico City | Mexico | Teatro Metropólitan |
| October 5 | Chengdu | China | Zhongyan Chengdu Grand Theatre |
| October 5 | Portland | United States | Arlene Schnitzer Concert Hall |
| October 6 | Seattle | United States | Benaroya Hall |
| October 7 | Shenzhen | China | Bay Opera of Shenzhen |
| October 8 | Detroit | United States | Fox Theatre |
| October 9 | Seoul | South Korea | Kyung Hee University Grand Peace Palace |
| October 9 | Milan | Italy | Teatro Dal Verme |
| October 10 | Vancouver | Canada | Queen Elizabeth Theatre |
| October 10 | Las Vegas | United States | Resorts World Theatre |
| October 11 | Jakarta | Indonesia | Ciputra Artpreneur |
| October 12 | Minneapolis | United States | Orpheum Theatre |
| October 15 | Milwaukee | United States | Riverside Theater |
| October 17 | Makati (Note: Labelled as Manila in promotion material.) | Philippines | Proscenium Theater |
| October 17 | Omaha | United States | The Astro Theater |
| October 18 | Makati | Philippines | Proscenium Theater |
| October 18 | Sugar Land (Note: Labelled as Houston in promotion material.) | United States | Smart Financial Centre |
| October 21 | Richmond | United States | Altria Theater |
| October 23 | Charlotte | United States | Ovens Auditorium |
| October 24 | Durham | United States | Durham Performing Arts Center |
| November 1 | Washington, D.C. | United States | The Anthem |
| November 1 | Kaohsiung | Taiwan | Kaohsiung Cultural Center |
| November 2 | Kaohsiung | Taiwan | Kaohsiung Cultural Center |
| November 3 | Kaohsiung | Taiwan | Kaohsiung Cultural Center |
| November 3 | St. Louis | United States | The Factory |
| November 5 | Melbourne | Australia | Melbourne Convention and Exhibition Centre |
| November 5 | Pittsburgh | United States | Benedum Center |
| November 5 | Fort Lauderdale | United States | Broward Center for the Performing Arts |
| November 7 | Orlando | United States | Walt Disney Theater |
| November 7 | Newark | United States | New Jersey Performing Arts Center |
| November 11 | Berlin | Germany | Tempodrom |
| November 12 | Liverpool | United Kingdom | Liverpool Olympia |
| November 13 | Halifax | United Kingdom | Victoria Theatre |
| November 14 | Grimsby | United Kingdom | Grimsby Auditorium |
| November 14 | Mesa | United States | Mesa Arts Center |
| November 15 | Newcastle | United Kingdom | O_{2} City Hall |
| November 19 | Montreal | Canada | Théâtre Saint-Denis |
| November 20 | Melbourne | Australia | Melbourne Convention and Exhibition Centre |
| November 20 | Montreal | Canada | Théâtre Saint-Denis |
| November 21 | Ottawa | Canada | National Arts Centre |
| November 27 | Sydney | Australia | TikTok Entertainment Centre |
| December 3 | Brisbane | Australia | Brisbane Convention & Exhibition Centre |

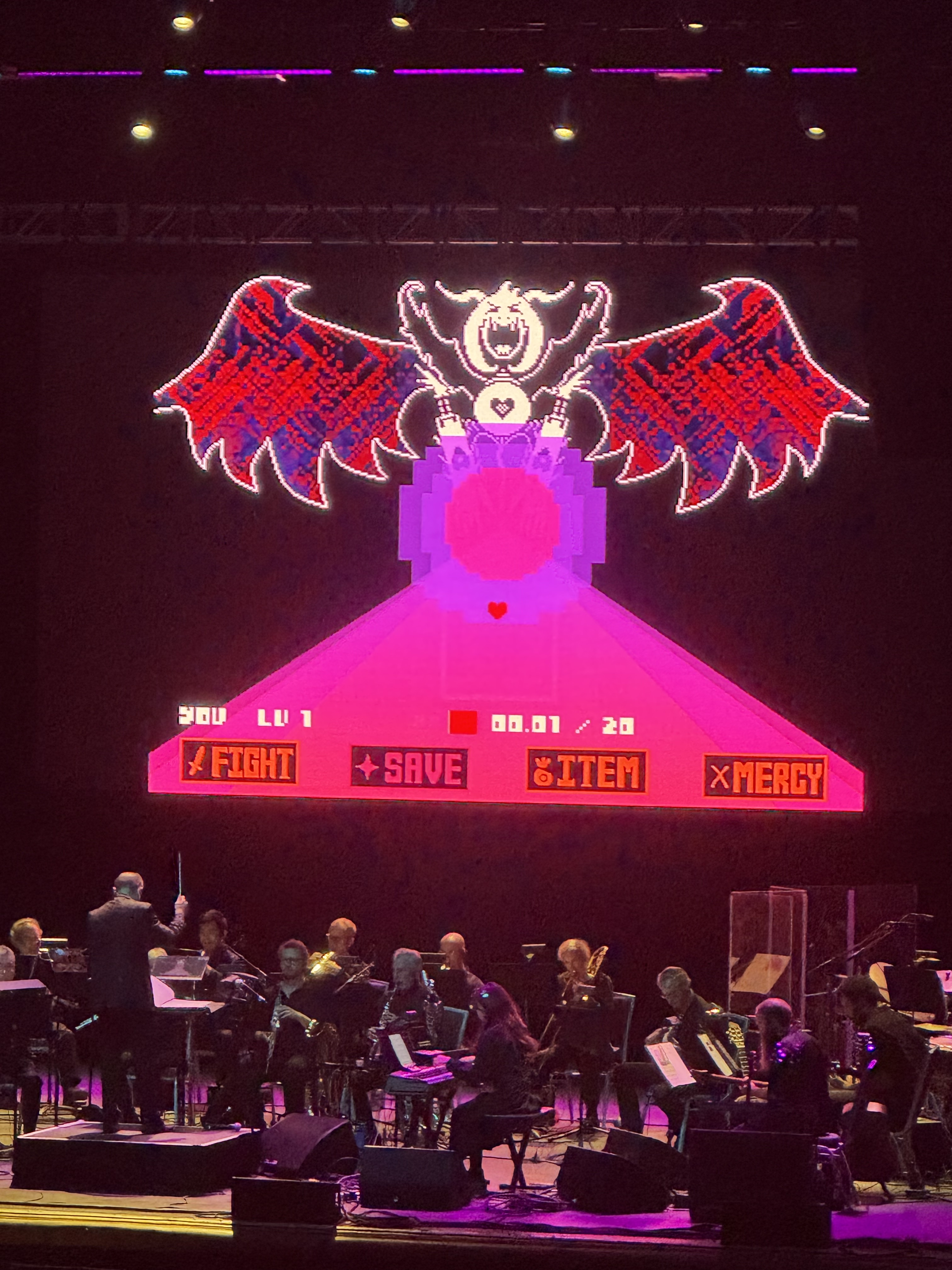
Undertale: The Determination Symphony concert in San Jose, August 23, 2026

List of 2027 concerts, showing date, city, country, venue
| Date (2027) | City | Country | Venue |
|---|---|---|---|
| January 9 | Edmonton | Canada | Northern Alberta Jubilee Auditorium |
| January 16 | Honolulu | United States | Hawaii Theatre |
| February 16 | Barcelona | Spain | Paral·lel 62 |
| February 17 | Madrid | Spain | The Music Station |
| February 18 | Madrid | Spain | The Music Station |
| February 21 | Dublin | Ireland | Bord Gáis Energy Theatre |
| February 28 | Glasgow | United Kingdom | Glasgow Royal Concert Hall |
| March 2 | São Paulo | Brazil | Teatro Bradesco |
| March 3 | São Paulo | Brazil | Teatro Bradesco |
| March 6 | Santiago | Chile | Coliseum Theatre |
| March 10 | Buenos Aires | Argentina | Teatro Opera |
| March 12 | Lima | Peru | Exposition Park Ampitheatre |

== Sources ==
- Toby Fox (2015). "Undertale".
- Cogswell, Jessica (March 31, 2025). "Undertale Kicks Off 10th Anniversary Celebrations With A One-Night-Only Orchestral Concert". GameSpot.
- "Undertale to celebrate 10th anniversary with The Determination Symphony concert at London's Eventim Apollo". West End Theatre. March 28, 2025.
- "Undertale Determination Symphony is a one-night orchestral concert celebrating the game's 10th anniversary". VideoGamer. March 28, 2025.
- "Extra Show Added for UNDERTALE's 10th Anniversary Concert at Eventim Apollo". Theatre Weekly. April 23, 2025.
- Materia Collective (2025). "Undertale celebrates its 10th anniversary with a landmark orchestral concert". X.
- "UNDERTALE: The Determination Symphony concert tour brings the beloved music of the hit indie game to more people than ever before". Games Press. March 17, 2026.
- "Undertale: The Determination Symphony world tour announced, begins August". RPG Site. March 18, 2026.
- "UNDERTALE: THE DETERMINATION SYMPHONY BRINGS THE BELOVED MUSIC OF THE HIT INDIE GAME TO RESORTS WORLD THEATRE, OCTOBER 10, 2026". Resorts World Las Vegas. March 19, 2026.
- "UNDERTALE: The Determination Symphony". Live Music Project. March 25, 2026.
- "UNDERTALE Determination Symphony with the Seattle Symphony". Seattle Symphony. 2026.
- "'Undertale' orchestral tour adds four more UK shows". NME. May 1, 2026.
- "UNDERTALE: The Determination Symphony World Tour kicks off Aug. 23rd, 2026 (UPDATE)". GoNintendo. May 1, 2026.
- "Tour Dates". UNDERTALE: The Determination Symphony. 2026.
