= Undertale Soundtrack =

Music from the video game Undertale

Soundtrack album by Toby Fox
- Released: September 15, 2015
- Genres: Video game music; chiptune
- Length: 130:28
- Label: Materia Collective
- Producer: Toby Fox

Toby Fox chronology
Undertale Demo OST (2013)	Undertale Soundtrack (2015)	Deltarune Chapter 1 (Original Game Soundtrack) (2018)

Undertale Soundtrack is a soundtrack album by Toby Fox, released in 2015 for the video game Undertale. Composed entirely with FL Studio, it was inspired by music from Super Nintendo Entertainment System role-playing games. It was released by video game music label Materia Collective on September 15, 2015. The track "Megalovania" has become one of the most popular video game songs.

The reception has been well received by critics as part of the success of the game, in particular for its use of various leitmotifs for the various characters used throughout various tracks. The soundtrack has been hailed as one of the best video game soundtracks ever made.

== Development ==
Undertale Soundtrack composer Toby Fox in 2017

The game's soundtrack was entirely composed by Toby Fox with FL Studio. A self-taught musician, he composed most of the tracks with little iteration; the song that plays in the final location before fighting Asgore, "Undertale", was the only song to undergo multiple iterations in development.

The soundtrack was inspired by music from Super Nintendo Entertainment System role-playing games—such as EarthBound and Live A Live—bullet hell series Touhou Project, the chiptune band Anamanaguchi, as well as the webcomic Homestuck, for which Fox provided some of the music. Fox also stated that he tries to be inspired by all music he listens to, particularly those in video games. Another example is the video game Off, which Fox states inspired the use of jazz in the composition of "Ghost Fight".

According to Fox, over 90% of the songs were composed specifically for the game. "Megalovania", the song used during the boss battle against Sans, had previously been used within Homestuck and in one of Toby Fox's EarthBound ROM hacks, called Earthbound: Halloween Hack. For each section of the game, Fox composed the music prior to programming, as it helped "decide how the scene should go".

He initially tried using the music tracker FamiTracker to compose the soundtrack, but found it difficult to use, claiming that he does not like trackers and that he "never found them very intuitive". He ultimately decided to play segments of the music separately, and connect them on a track. To celebrate the first anniversary of the game, Fox released five unused musical works on his blog in 2016. Four of the game's songs were released as official downloadable content for the Steam version of Taito's Groove Coaster.

== Release ==
Undertale's official soundtrack was released by video game music label Materia Collective in 2015, simultaneously with the game's release. Additionally, two official Undertale cover albums have been released: the 2015 metal/electronic album Determination by RichaadEB and Ace Waters, and the 2016 jazz album Live at Grillby's by Carlos Eiene, better known as insaneintherainmusic. Another album of jazz duets based on Undertale's songs, Prescription for Sleep, was performed and released in 2016 by saxophonist Norihiko Hibino and pianist Ayaki Sato. A 2×LP vinyl edition of the Undertale soundtrack, produced by iam8bit, was also released in the same year. Two official Undertale Piano Collections sheet music books and digital albums, arranged by David Peacock and performed by Augustine Mayuga Gonzales, were released in 2017 and 2018 by Materia Collective.

A Mii Fighter costume based on Sans was made available for download in the crossover title Super Smash Bros. Ultimate in September 2019, marking the character's official debut as a 3D model. This costume also adds a new arrangement of "Megalovania" by Fox as a music track. Super Smash Bros. director Masahiro Sakurai noted that Sans was a popular request to appear in the game. Music from Undertale was also added to Taiko no Tatsujin: Drum 'n' Fun! as downloadable content.

== Reception ==
"Hopes and Dreams"
"Hopes and Dreams", a song from one of the game's final boss fights, was praised for reintroducing many of the game's previous themes in a different style.

Undertale's soundtrack has been well received by critics as part of the success of the game, in particular for its use of various leitmotifs for the various characters used throughout various tracks. In particular, "Hopes and Dreams", the boss theme when fighting Asriel Dreemurr in the pacifist playthrough, a run-through where the player avoids killing any monster, brings back most of the main character themes, and is "a perfect way to cap off your journey", according to USgamer's Nadia Oxford. Oxford notes this track in particular demonstrates Fox's ability at "turning old songs into completely new experiences", used throughout the game's soundtrack. Tyler Hicks of GameSpot compared the music to "bit-based melodies".

The Undertale soundtrack had frequently been covered by various styles and groups. As part of the fifth anniversary of the game, Fox streamed footage with permission of a 2019 concert of the Undertale songs performed by Music Engine, an orchestra group in Japan, with support of Fangamer and 8–4. The soundtrack has been hailed as one of the best video game soundtracks ever made. (Note: Attributed to multiple sources:)

The track "Megalovania" has become one of the most popular video game songs. It has seen extensive use in Internet memes and was already popular among the Homestuck fandom, as another version of the song was associated with the characters Vriska Serket, Jack Noir, and Aradia Megido. In January 2022, the song was played in a circus performance during a weekly public audience with Pope Francis.

== Track listing ==
All tracks are written by Toby Fox.

Disc 1
No.	Title	Length
1.	"Once Upon a Time"	1:28
2.	"Start Menu"	0:32
3.	"Your Best Friend"	0:23
4.	"Fallen Down"	0:57
5.	"Ruins"	1:32
6.	"Uwa!! So Temperate"	0:56
7.	"Anticipation"	0:22
8.	"Unnecessary Tension"	0:17
9.	"Enemy Approaching"	0:56
10.	"Ghost Fight"	0:56
11.	"Determination"	0:50
12.	"Home"	2:03
13.	"Home (Music Box)"	2:02
14.	"Heartache"	1:48
15.	"sans."	0:50
16.	"Nyeh Heh Heh!"	0:32
17.	"Snowy"	1:44
18.	"Uwa!! So Holiday"	0:30
19.	"Dogbass"	0:06
20.	"Mysterious Place"	0:44
21.	"Dogsong"	0:37
22.	"Snowdin Town"	1:16
23.	"Shop"	0:50
24.	"Bonetrousle"	0:57
25.	"Dating Start!"	1:56
26.	"Dating Tense!"	0:26
27.	"Dating Fight!"	0:35
28.	"Premonition"	1:01
29.	"Danger Mystery"	0:18
30.	"Undyne"	0:45
31.	"Waterfall"	2:06
32.	"Run!"	0:26
33.	"Quiet Water"	0:32
34.	"Memory"	1:15
35.	"Bird That Carries You Over a Disproportionately Small Gap"	0:25
36.	"Dummy!"	2:25
37.	"Pathetic House"	0:38
38.	"Spooktune"	0:23
39.	"Spookwave"	0:25
40.	"Ghouliday"	0:12
41.	"Chill"	0:56
42.	"Thundersnail"	0:42
43.	"Temmie Village"	0:57
44.	"Tem Shop"	0:45
45.	"Ngahhh!!"	1:22
46.	"Spear of Justice"	1:55
47.	"Ooo"	0:14
48.	"Alphys"	1:25
49.	"It's Showtime!"	0:46
50.	"Metal Crusher"	1:03
51.	"Another Medium"	2:22
52.	"Uwa!! So Heats!!"	0:33
53.	"Stronger Monsters"	1:03
54.	"Hotel"	1:27
55.	"Can You Really Call This a Hotel, I Didn't Receive a Mint on My Pillow or Anything"	1:01
56.	"Confession"	0:42
57.	"Live Report"	0:17
58.	"Death Report"	0:47
59.	"Spider Dance"	1:46
60.	"Wrong Enemy!?"	0:58
61.	"Oh! One True Love"	1:24
62.	"Oh! Dungeon"	0:32
63.	"It's Raining Somewhere Else"	2:50
64.	"Core Approach"	0:12
65.	"Core"	2:46
66.	"Last Episode!"	0:07
67.	"Oh My..."	0:14
68.	"Death by Glamour"	2:14
69.	"For the Fans"	1:47
70.	"Long Elevator"	0:20
71.	"Undertale" (guitar by Stephanie MacIntire)	6:21
72.	"Song That Might Play When You Fight Sans"	1:02
73.	"The Choice"	2:12
74.	"Small Shock"	0:14
75.	"Barrier"	0:31
76.	"Bergentrückung"	0:21
77.	"Asgore"	2:36

Disc 2
No.	Title	Length
78.	"You Idiot"	0:34
79.	"Your Best Nightmare"	4:00
80.	"Finale"	1:52
81.	"An Ending"	3:28
82.	"She's Playing Piano"	0:18
83.	"Here We Are"	2:06
84.	"Amalgam"	1:20
85.	"Fallen Down (Reprise)"	2:30
86.	"Don't Give Up"	2:02
87.	"Hopes and Dreams"	3:01
88.	"Burn in Despair!"	0:21
89.	"Save the World"	1:53
90.	"His Theme"	2:05
91.	"Final Power"	0:18
92.	"Reunited"	4:44
93.	"Menu (Full)"	0:32
94.	"Respite"	1:54
95.	"Bring It In, Guys!"	4:12
96.	"Last Goodbye"	2:15
97.	"But the Earth Refused to Die"	0:34
98.	"Battle Against a True Hero"	2:36
99.	"Power of "NEO""	0:30
100.	"Megalovania"	2:36
101.	"Good Night"	0:31
Total length:		129:52

== Charts ==
Chart (2016)	Peak position
UK Independent Album Breakers (OCC)	19
UK Soundtrack Albums (Official Charts)	25
US Independent Albums (Billboard)	21
US Soundtrack Albums (Billboard)	5
