= Ovens Auditorium =

American venue in North Carolina

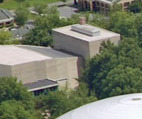
- An image of ovens auditorium
- Interactive map of Ovens Auditorium
- Address: 2700 East Independence Blvd. Charlotte, North Carolina; United States
- Coordinates: 35°12′13″N 80°47′39″W
- Owner: City of Charlotte
- Capacity: 2,460

Construction
- Opened: 1955
- Architect: A. G. Odell Jr. & Associates

Website
- www.ovensauditorium.com

Ovens Auditorium is an auditorium located adjacent to Bojangles Coliseum, in Charlotte, North Carolina. Opened in 1955, Ovens has a seating capacity of 2,455 and has hosted over 7,500 events (as of April 2009). It is owned by the City of Charlotte and managed by the Charlotte Regional Visitors Authority. The auditorium underwent minor renovations in 2002, that resulted in ADA compliance, better acoustics and an upgrade of the sound system.

== Concerts ==
List of Concerts
- Bruce Springsteen – March 29, 1976, with The E Street Band and December 14, 1996
- Billy Joel – March 18, 1977
- Roberta Flack – April 23, 1978, with Bill Withers
- B.B. King – October 27, 1988, February 26, 2003 and May 8, 2005
- Bonnie Raitt – June 4, 1989, March 8, 2006, with Randall Bramblett and October 11, 2012, with Sarah Siskind
- Lou Reed – August 7, 1989
- 10,000 Maniacs – September 10, 1989
- The Allman Brothers Band – July 14, 1990, with Blues Traveler
- Gordon Lightfoot – July 17, 1990 and May 7, 2009
- Melissa Etheridge – July 19, 1990, July 11, 1992, with Jeffrey Gaines, June 24, 2008, with Melvin Taylor and July 22, 2010
- Bob Dylan – October 31, 1990
- Morrissey – November 19, 1992, with Big Sandy & His Fly-Rite Boys
- George Winston – February 14, 1993 and January 11, 1997
- The Beach Boys – November 18, 1993, April 7, 2002 and May 6, 2003, with The Charlotte Symphony Orchestra
- Shawn Colvin – October 12, 1994, with David Gray
- Tori Amos – August 21, 1996, August 12, 1998, October 4, 2001, with Rufus Wainwright, February 25, 2003, with Jeffrey Gaines and November 13, 2007
- The Black Crowes – November 23, 1996, with Gov't Mule and March 21, 1999
- Harry Connick Jr. – December 11, 1996, March 3, 1998, August 19, 1999, August 19, 2000 and March 4, 2007
- John Denver – February 20, 1997
- Crosby, Stills & Nash – June 21, 1997 and May 19, 2013
- Dan Fogelberg – October 29, 1997
- The Grand Funk Railroad – January 27, 1998
- Our Lady Peace – July 31, 1998
- The Smashing Pumpkins – August 6, 1998 and August 15, 2008
- Journey – November 3, 1998
- Marilyn Manson – November 10, 1998, with 12 Rounds
- 98 Degrees with Jessica Simpson – May 4, 1999
- Natalie Merchant – May 12, 1999 and August 31, 2010
- Live – October 2, 1999
- Sting – November 9, 1999, with Meshell Ndegeocello
- John Prine – March 3, 2000, February 10, 2006, with Keith Sykes, March 27, 2009, with Sara Watkins and December 7, 2013, with Justin Townes Earle
- Tracy Chapman – March 28, 2000 and November 7, 2003
- Jackson Browne – April 5, 2000
- Fiona Apple – April 17, 2000, with Mark Oliver Everett
- Will Downing – July 30, 2000, with Chanté Moore, Gerald Albright and Phil Perry
- Hanson – August 31, 2000
- Ani DiFranco – September 13, 2000, with Kurt Swinghammer
- Alicia Keys – February 12, 2001, with Donell Jones and February 12, 2002, with Glenn Lewis
- The Charlotte Symphony Orchestra – March 8, 2001, June 19, 2008, February 19, 2011, March 10, 2012 and March 21, 2015
- O-Town – March 21, 2001, with Lugo and Mariama
- Erykah Badu – March 25, 2001, with Musiq Soulchild, February 26, 2006 and October 20, 2012, with Rickey Smiley
- R. Kelly – August 8, 2001, March 29, 2006 and November 21, 2009, with Pleasure P and K. Michelle
- Jill Scott – August 22, 2001, with Mike Phillips and June 29, 2008, with Bilal
- Maxwell – September 20, 2001, with Alicia Keys
- The Happy Goodman Family – March 12, 2002, with Boney James
- Norah Jones – June 13, 2003, with Gillian Welch, August 17, 2004, with The Handsome Band and Amos Lee and May 12, 2010, with Elvis Perkins in Dearland
- Patty Griffin – October 28, 2003
- The Blue Man Group – November 7, 2003, with Venus Hum and Tracy Bonham
- Whodini – November 8, 2003, with Chris Rock
- Big Bad Voodoo Daddy – April 23–24, 2004
- Johnny Gill – July 8, 2004, with Christopher Williams, Dave Hollister and Monifah
- Yolanda Adams – September 11, 2004 and February 6, 2005, with Kelly Price, Martha Munizzi, Sheila E. and Juanita Bynum
- Bruce Hornsby & The Noisemakers – October 9, 2004
- k.d. lang – October 14, 2004 and April 8, 2009, with Meaghan Smith
- The Producers – October 19, 2004
- KEM – November 14, 2004, with Fourplay, February 16, 2008, with Jay Lamont, November 7, 2009, April 1, 2011, with El DeBarge and Ledisi, September 5, 2012 and November 21, 2014, with Joe and L'Renee
- The Trans-Siberian Orchestra – November 18, 2004
- Ringo Starr & His All-Starr Band – February 6, 2005
- Wilco – February 21, 2005, with Detholz! and June 20, 2007, with Low
- The Temptations – March 11–12, 2005
- Juanes – March 13, 2005
- Ashlee Simpson – April 2, 2005, with The Click Five and Pepper's Ghost
- Lenny Kravitz – April 10, 2005, with Nikka Costa
- Andrew W.K. – April 19, 2005, with The High Speed Scene and Hush
- Franco De Vita – May 1, 2005
- Trey Anastasio & 70 Volt Parade – May 4, 2005, with The North Mississippi Allstars
- Lyfe Jennings – June 25, 2005, with John Legend
- Michael Bublé – July 15, 2005
- Nickel Creek – October 13, 2005, with Leona Naess and August 5, 2007, with Fiona Apple
- The String Cheese Incident – October 19, 2005, with Hot Buttered Rum
- Amy Grant – October 21, 2005
- Union Station – January 18, 2006
- Glen Campbell – February 17–18, 2006
- INXS – February 21, 2006, with The Lovehammers
- O.A.R. – February 25, 2006, with The Exit
- moe. – March 2, 2006
- Hayley Westenra – March 10, 2006
- The 70's Soul Jam Concert – March 31, 2006
- Heather Headley – April 9, 2006, with Anthony Hamilton and Van Hunt
- Wynonna Judd – October 14, 2006
- Nick Lachey – October 15, 2006
- Vince Gill – November 4, 2006 and December 16, 2008, with Amy Grant
- Jim Brickman – December 19, 2006 and December 23, 2008
- Sara Evans – January 12, 2007, with Radney Foster
- Chris Botti – January 17, 2007
- The Fray – January 22, 2007, with Mutemath
- Lyle Lovett – January 25, 2007, with John Hiatt, Joe Ely and Guy Clark
- George Jones – February 17, 2007
- Rodney Carrington – February 22, 2007, April 4, 2009, February 25, 2011, February 25, 2012 and January 15, 2015
- Celtic Woman – March 21–23 and October 23–25, 2007, June 2–3, 2009, February 18, 2010, March 3, 2011, February 21, 2012 and March 6, 2014
- Paul & Storm – April 6, 2007
- Art Garfunkel – April 21, 2007
- The Dixie Hummingbirds – April 22, 2007
- Godsmack – May 16, 2007
- Jerry Butler – June 29, 2007
- The Impressions – August 18, 2007, with Sunset Drive
- Natalie Cole – October 12, 2007, with The Charlotte Symphony Orchestra and April 13, 2012
- Chris Cornell – November 6, 2007, with Earl Greyhound
- RatDog – November 8, 2007, with The Steve Kimock Band
- Sugarfoot's Ohio Players – November 17, 2007 and October 10 and December 19, with Zapp, 2009
- Daughtry – December 15, 2007 and April 9, 2012, with Mike Sanchez and SafetySuit
- The Ring of Fire – March 15, 2008
- Ne-Yo – March 20, 2008, with Spread Love
- Johnny Mathis – April 25, 2008, with The Charlotte Symphony Orchestra
- Bowfire – May 7, 2008
- The High Kings – May 8 and October 3, 2008
- Mark Knopfler – July 27, 2008, with Jesca Hoop
- Loretta Lynn – August 22, 2008 and February 26, 2011, with Sonia Leigh
- Mint Condition – September 26, 2008, with Jon B. and November 1, 2009, with Eric Benét
- James Taylor – October 19, 2008
- The Australian Pink Floyd Show – October 21, 2008
- The Pointer Sisters – October 24, 2008
- The Temptations Review featuring Dennis Edwards – November 7, 2008
- David Byrne – December 10, 2008
- Raphael Saadiq – December 12, 2008, with John Legend
- The Ultimate Doo–Wop Concert – December 13, 2008 and April 28, 2012
- Lalah Hathaway – February 15, 2009, with Rahsaan Patterson and Noel Gourdin
- Kenny Rogers – February 27, 2009
- Ben Folds – March 1, 2009, with The Miniature Tigers
- The Laurie Berkner Band – March 29, 2009
- Jennifer Hudson – April 17, 2009, with Robin Thicke
- The Lou Gramm Band – May 30, 2009
- Musiq Soulchild – June 28, 2009, with Anthony Hamilton and Chrisette Michele and March 16, 2011, with KEM, El DeBarge and Ledisi
- Little Anthony and the Imperials – September 4, 2009
- Joe Bonamassa – October 28, 2009, November 18, 2011 and November 12, 2013
- Willie Nelson & Family – October 30, 2009
- Kathy Mattea – February 5, 2010
- The Ultimate Elvis Tribute Artists Concert – February 13, 2010
- The Charlotte Blues Festival – February 26, 2010
- The Irish Tenors – March 19, 2010
- The Pixies – September 8–9, 2010, with The Fuck Buttons
- Fantasia Barrino – November 17, 2010, with Eric Benét and Kandi Burruss
- Oumou Sangaré – November 28, 2010
- Robert Plant & The Band of Joy – February 7, 2011, with The North Mississippi Allstars
- The Four Tops – March 18–19, 2011
- Smokey Robinson – April 15, 2011
- Steve Martin & The Steep Canyon Rangers – May 11, 2011
- David Gray – July 2, 2011, with Lisa O'Neill
- Brian McKnight – July 27 and October 7, 2011
- Peter White – September 15, 2011
- El DeBarge – September 16, 2011, with Rachelle Ferrell
- "Weird Al" Yankovic – October 8, 2011
- John Hiatt – October 9, 2011, with Big Head Todd and the Monsters
- Puscifer – November 27, 2011, with Carina Round
- NEEDTOBREATHE – March 2, 2012, with Ben Rector
- Tyrese Gibson – March 24, 2012, with Chrisette Michele
- Trace Adkins – April 20, 2012
- Hawk Nelson – May 5, 2012, with Jamie Grace and Chad Eastham
- The Imagination Movers – May 15, 2012
- Jane's Addiction – May 23, 2012, with The Duke Spirit
- Earth, Wind & Fire – June 22, 2012
- This is the 60's Concert – July 13, 2012
- Shreya Ghoshal – September 21, 2012
- Anthony Hamilton – October 7, 2012, with Estelle and Antoine Dunn
- Regina Belle – February 9, 2013, with Kelly Price, Chanté Moore and Shirley Murdock
- Diana Krall – April 7, 2013
- The Old Crow Medicine Show – May 16, 2013, with Chuck Mead & His Grassy Knoll Boys
- Chrisette Michele – September 21, 2013, with Dwele and K. Michelle
- The Weeknd – October 1, 2013, with BANKS and Anna Lunoe
- Charlie Wilson – December 27, 2013, with MC Lightfoot
- Arab Idol Live! – December 28, 2013
- The Fresh Beat Band – January 26, 2014
- Salt-N-Pepa – February 8, 2014, with Guy and Rob Base
- Jagged Edge – February 15, 2014, with Meli'sa Morgan, Next, Hi-Five and DJ RL
- Don Williams – March 16, 2014, with Colm Kirwan
- Amos Lee – April 12, 2014, with Rayland Baxter
- Brit Floyd: The Pink Floyd Tribute Show – May 10, 2014
- The Legends of Old School Hip Hop Concert – May 31, 2014
- The Voice Live! – June 30, 2014
- Fred Hammond – October 11, 2014, with Donnie McClurkin
- Ray LaMontagne – November 1, 2014, with The Belle Brigade
- Chrissie Hynde – November 8, 2014, with The Rails
- Straight No Chaser – November 16, 2014
- The Brian Setzer Orchestra – December 6, 2014
- The Australian Bee Gees Show – January 29, 2015
- The R&B Reunion Concert – February 14, 2015
- Sarah McLachlan – March 18, 2015
- John Mellencamp – March 27, 2015, with Carlene Carter
- Undertale: The Determination Symphony – October 23 2026, curated by Toby Fox

== Other events ==
- Billy Graham Crusades played in late 1950s.
- Wicked sold out for two straight weeks in 2008 becoming the first for straight sellouts.
- High school and college graduations have made Ovens Auditorium their home
- Family shows that have made their way to Ovens Auditorium include:
  - The Backyardigans
  - Disney Live
  - My Little Pony Live
  - Raggs
  - The Pout Pout Fish

== Awards and recognitions ==
In 2008, Ovens Auditorium was named the #38 Top Theatre in the World by POLLSTAR.
