= A Profound Waste of Time =

Crowdfunded video game magazine

A Profound Waste of Time is a British contemporary video game magazine. Crowdfunded through Kickstarters, the magazine is self-published by freelance graphic designer Caspian Whistler. The campaign for the first issue in 2016 raised £39,000; four issues have been published, and a fifth has been crowdfunded. A Profound Waste of Time has received positive reviews from journalists.

== Publication history ==
Freelance graphic designer Caspian Whistler began making video game zines while studying at University of the Arts London. Exposed to many quality print publications for other areas of the arts, Whistler felt that video game magazines were "bleak" in comparison. He was inspired to create "something celebratory and optimistic" to recapture his love for video games. In an interview with Creative Review, Whistler said that he intended to move away "more reactionary" and mainstream aspects of video game journalism such as review scores and exclusives through a print format, enabling a "different kind" of gaming discussion. He also believed that discussion around the emotional aspects of games was lacking.

Whistler began A Profound Waste of Time (APWOT) while studying graphic design at the Chelsea College of Art as part of a project about zines and counterculture. Although Whistler initially wrote and designed his new side-project himself, he was surprised by the positive response after he posted images of the project on a forum. In 2016 he began crowdfunding the publication of the first issue of A Profound Waste of Time on Kickstarter with the aim of £20,000, raising £39,000. The second issue was released five years later in 2021 after its Kickstarter campaign raised £62,165. Another campaign for reprints of both issues raised over £89,000 sixteen days before closure. Both issues have special editions. A third issue was funded through a Kickstarter campaign 2022. The fourth issues was funded in 2023. In 2024, the fifth issue was funded and a second reprint campaign reached its funding goal the following year.

== Contents ==
A Profound Waste of Time is a "gaming magazine printed on high-quality paper stock". The magazine has a focus on illustrations, design and words from a variety of different contributors, and does not have any screenshots. Its design was consulted on by Leo Field, it uses various types of printing and commissions various artists; the first issue features cover art of Shovel Knight (2014) by Dan Mumford. Whistler focused on using the physical nature of the magazine to its full effect, incorporating booklet inserts, foldouts, tip-ins and holographic covers. Issues include interviews and in-depth feature articles, and the second is almost 200 pages long. Special editions also have effects such as glow-in-the-dark and rainbow effects; the special edition of the third issue has a thermochromic ink layer.

== Known contributors and artists ==
=== Issue 1 ===
From

- Tommy Refenes
- Rami Ismail
- Adrian Bauer
- Adam Heart
- Temmie Chang
- Kat Brewster
- Hannah Nicklin
- Adam Tierney
- Dant Rambo
- Dennis Wedin, co-founder of Dennaton Games
- Ojiro Fumoto, developer of Downwell (2015)
- Ashly Burch
- Toby Fox
- Jake Kaufman
- John ‘JJSignal’ James, director of 2064: Read Only Memories (2015)
- Jonathan Holmes
- Dan Mumford (cover artist)

=== Issue 2 ===
From

- Amanda Yeo
- Keita Takahashi
- Laura E. Hall
- Tetsuya Mizuguchi
- Simon Parkin
- Jenny Jiao Hsia
- John Ricciardi
- Holly Nielsen
- Joakim ‘Konjak’ Sandberg
- Kris Piotrowski
- Chella Ramanan
- Ben Bertoli
- John ‘JJSignal’ James, director of 2064: Read Only Memories (2015)
- Liam Wong
- Team Cherry, developer of Hollow Knight (2017)
- Joe Sparrow
- Camille Young
- Keith Stuart
- Doug John Miller (cover artist)

=== Issue 3 ===
From

- Simon Parkin
- Grace Curtis
- Kyle Bosman
- Tim Schafer
- Matt Leone

== Accolades ==
| Year | Ceremony | Category | Result | Ref. |
|---|---|---|---|---|
| 2018 | Stack Awards | Launch of the Year | Nominated | |
| 2018 | Stack Awards | Best Use of Illustration | Nominated | |
| 2019 | ADC Annual Awards | Publication Design | Merit Honor | |
