= EarthBound Halloween Hack =

2008 ROM hack of EarthBound

- Screenshot of Varik in the "Sewers" area
- Developer: Toby Fox
- Composer: Toby Fox
- Platform: Super Nintendo Entertainment System
- Release: November 1, 2008
- Genre: Role-playing
- Mode: Single-player

The EarthBound Halloween Hack (Note: Also known as the Radiation Halloween Hack, Radiation's Halloween Hack, or Press the B Button) is a 2008 ROM hack of the Super Nintendo Entertainment System video game EarthBound, developed by American indie developer Toby Fox. It is a role-playing game featuring gameplay similar to the original EarthBound. It takes place in an alternative timeline of EarthBound where Varik, the main character, soon enters the lab of Dr. Andonuts, who has been wracked with grief, believing that his actions during EarthBound's story killed his son Jeff. The EarthBound Halloween Hack has been described as featuring similarities in themes and writing to Fox's later game Undertale. It was one of Fox's earliest experiences in game development, drawing inspiration from the Brandish series. It was released on November 1, 2008.

Retrospectively, the EarthBound Halloween Hack has been subject to mixed reception by video game journalists, who praised its overall writing while criticizing its edgy humor. "Megalovania" from its audio track was later remixed for other projects Fox worked on, including Undertale, where it attained wide popularity. Fox has since looked back unfavorably on the EarthBound Halloween Hack.

== Gameplay and plot ==
The EarthBound Halloween Hack is a role-playing game with the same gameplay to the original EarthBound. The visuals, which include modified sprites and music, are tonally darker than the original. It has new enemies, including dogs that have tentacles for faces, Starmen corpses, and zombies, and more areas to explore than EarthBound.

It takes place in an alternate timeline after the end of EarthBound, where Ness and his friends do not return home after defeating Giygas. Varik, the main character, is hired by ex-mayor B. H. Pirkle to investigate a murder, and is given a key to the sewers to find clues. He finds the lab of mad scientist Dr. Andonuts, who is overcome with grief, believing that his actions during EarthBound's story killed his son Jeff. Once the player gets to Dr. Andonuts' lab, they have the option to stab him to death; if this is chosen, the game ends. Otherwise, if the player presses the B button, Varik is transported to Magicant, a dreamland of Andonuts' subconscious. At the end of the hack, the final boss fight is against Dr. Andonuts; after defeating him, Varik leaves the lab and returns home to rest.

== Development and release ==
Developer Toby Fox in 2017

The EarthBound Halloween Hack was developed by Toby Fox, an American indie developer and composer. Fox's earliest experiences in game development included using RPG Maker to create role-playing games and creating ROM hacks in high school. The EarthBound Halloween Hack was one of his earliest works.

It draws inspiration from the Brandish series, directly using its main character Ares ("Varik" in the original English SNES translation of Brandish) as a substitute for EarthBound's Ness and its final boss track, "Megalovania," being inspired by the Brandish 2: The Planet Buster song "Gadobadorrer." In a writeup on the hack's development, Fox described ROM hacking as "a mind-numbing experience most easily comparable to attempting to excavate the ruins of an ancient, long-lost civilization using only a small set of tools. Also, the ruins are made of crumbly graham crackers and the explorer's hands are made of atom bombs." He used PK Hack, a ROM editing software designed for EarthBound. Fox said one of his core desires making the hack was to explore homosexual characters in media that were non-stereotypical.

The EarthBound Halloween Hack was released on November 1, 2008, for a ROM-hacking competition on the EarthBound-centered forum Starmen.net.

== Reception ==
Retrospectively, the EarthBound Halloween Hack has been subject to mixed reception by journalists. Miri Teixeira of GamesRadar+ wrote that "if you fit into that group of Undertale/Deltarune fans [who] are able to handle a good dose of teenage edginess – I'd still [...] recommend the Halloween Hack today." Hardcore Gaming 101's Jonathan Kaharl called the Halloween Hack "almost like a prototype Undertale in terms of themes, comedy and tone", but said that "it's not hard to see why Toby Fox looks back on [it] poorly," critiquing its hit and miss black comedy. Sebastian Santabarbara of Retro Dodo described it as akin to "a cross between Silent Hill and Grand Theft Auto", including it in his list of the "best SNES ROM hacks ever created".

Mike Wilson of Bloody Disgusting said the mechanics were more "difficult than the original game". Kaharl and Teixeira were both critical of the game's difficulty level, which they described as very high, with Teixeira referring to it as "ridiculous", and Kaharl noting the high damage from enemies.

Reviewers praised EarthBound Halloween Hack's writing but criticized its edgy humor. Teixeira said the writing "might be dismissed as edgy or cringe" with the dialogue being "clumsily worded". Kaharl described the writing as "if Earthbound is an early season of The Simpsons, The Halloween Hack is the first season of South Park"; criticising the line “tl;dr: eat shit, faggots” during the final boss fight in particular. Santabarbara called the writing "hilarious, if a little disturbing at times."

== Legacy ==
The final boss fight against Dr. Andonuts in the EarthBound Halloween Hack, where "Megalovania" was first heard.

Clyde "Tomato" Mandelin, the co-founder of Starmen.net and the creator of the 2006 Mother 3 fan translation, was impressed by the custom music used in the hack, saying it is "crazy hard to hack in EarthBound." Fox has since looked back on the EarthBound Halloween Hack poorly, calling it a "bad rom hack with swears" on Twitter in 2016.

The song that plays during the final boss fight, "Megalovania", was later remixed for subsequent projects Fox worked on, including Homestuck and Undertale. The Undertale version of the track became widely popular, spawning various memes and remixes, which were described as a "subgenre in [its] own right" on YouTube. In 2019, Fox created a new arrangement of the track for Super Smash Bros. Ultimate.
