= Megalovania =

Video game music track

- Boss fight against Dr. Andonuts in the EarthBound Halloween Hack, where "Megalovania" was first heard

Song by Toby Fox from the ROM hack EarthBound Halloween Hack
- Released: November 1, 2008
- Genre: Video game music
- Length: 1:59
- Composer: Toby Fox
- Homestuck (2011 as "MeGaLoVania", 2:49); Undertale (2015, 2:36); Super Smash Bros. Ultimate (2019, 2:32)

Audio sample
- Beginning of "Megalovania" in Undertale: file; help

"Megalovania" (sometimes stylized in all caps) is an instrumental video game song composed by Toby Fox. It was first composed for the EarthBound Halloween Hack, a ROM hack of EarthBound, developed for a Mother fansite's competition in 2008. Inspired by "Megalomania" from Live A Live and the final boss music of Brandish 2: The Planet Buster, the track was intended for the ROM hack's final boss battle, and was developed by Fox screaming "whatever [he] felt like" into a microphone and copying it down. Its title is a combination of "megalomania" and "Transylvania", the latter of which intended to tie into the project's Halloween theme. In 2011, it would be remixed for the webcomic Homestuck's soundtrack as "MeGaLoVania" with help from Joren "Tensei" de Bruin, and Fox would use another rendition as the final boss theme for the "genocide" route in his 2015 video game, Undertale, when fighting the character Sans.

The track has been widely popular, and more so with the release of Undertale, which spawned various memes and remixes to the degree of being named its own subgenre on YouTube. The track has since appeared in other games and media such as Super Smash Bros. Ultimate, and was performed in a live rendition for Pope Francis by a circus. Other musicians such as Yoko Shimomura have also performed their own interpretations. Various media outlets have praised it for its intensity and composition, and "Megalovania" has been used to not only examine Undertale's underlying messages but internet reaction as a whole through its use on social media platforms such as TikTok.

== Conception and history ==
In 2008, starmen.net, a fansite dedicated to the Mother video game series, held its annual "Halloween Funfest" competition for fan works related to the franchise. In November of that year, Toby Fox, going by the online alias "Radiation", submitted an EarthBound ROM hack titled the EarthBound Halloween Hack. The ROM hack featured custom music from other games, and for the final boss Fox originally intended to use the song "Megalomania" from the Super Nintendo game Live A Live. A recurring theme playing at the end of each of the game's chapters, Fox was struck by the simplicity of "Megalomania", but also felt its repeated use had created a "Pavlovian" sense of "This is the end" in player's minds. However, when he attempted to transcribe the music to recreate it he found it too difficult, and after some consideration decided instead to make a completely new song.

To this end he screamed "whatever [he] felt like" into a microphone and then copied it down, making it a lengthy process. Composing the song afterward by comparison was very quick, taking Fox about thirty minutes. Despite using similar chords, the track took inspiration from "Megalomania" not in terms of composition but by "TOTALLY attempting to be the kind of a badass song that might be suitable for a similar purpose". Meanwhile, the melody itself was inspired by the final boss theme of Brandish 2: The Planet Buster, a game series that heavily influenced several other aspects of the ROM hack. After the ROM hack's release, he noticed people were ripping the music from it directly; however, the in-game rendition had a built-in delay which carried over to the rips. He chose to release a copy generated directly from the music editor, but then realized he had never named the song. After consideration he dubbed it "Megalovania", a combination of its original inspiration and "Transylvania", the latter half meant to try to add some "Halloweeniness into it" due to its origin.

Fox later worked as a musician for the webcomic Homestuck, and in 2011 "Megalovania" was remixed for its sixth volume, Heir Transparent with Joren "Tensei" de Bruin providing guitar music to the track. The track was made noticeably longer, and while Fox had used synthesized guitars on his other tracks, he found them sounding "muddy" when shifting them down an octave due to the original Super Nintendo audio, which itself could not be altered as in Fox's eyes that would have defeated the purpose of the song. Instead he wrote several extended guitar sections, trying to ensure they did not "sound screechy and stupid" while still sounding "badass", which was aided by the fact de Bruin's guitar could play a note higher than most can. Due to it being technically the third release of the song, he capitalized various letters to differentiate it, resulting in "MeGaLoVania". After its release, despite both he and de Bruin being happy with the final results he acknowledged some of the criticisms it had received, stating he felt the guitar solo he had added was "uncreative" and would do the track over without the Super Nintendo audio for later renditions.

In 2015, Fox released Undertale, a game he developed and composed music for. "Megalovania" returns as the boss music for the character Sans, who fights the player near the end of the game's "genocide" route after the player has killed nearly every other non-player character in the game. This rendition is closer to the original ROM hack's, though removes the slow startup that preceded it. It has also served as the basis for subsequent uses of the song, such as an arrangement composed by Fox for Super Smash Bros. Ultimate in 2019 as downloadable content. Additionally, several other games have used the song as part of a cross-promotion with Undertale, including Pop'n Music, Dance Dance Revolution A3, and Gitadora High-Voltage, the last of which utilized a rock and roll arrangement of it by Yuya Yokoyama. In 2019, MUSIC Engine in Tokyo, Japan performed an orchestral rendition of Undertale's music which included "Megalovania".

== Reception and legacy ==
Since its release, "Megalovania" has become one of the most popular video game songs, appearing on television programs and being briefly sung by actor and musician Jack Black for his YouTube gaming channel, and has been described as easily recognizable just from its first 4 notes, even for those unfamiliar with gaming. Ryan Woodrow for Sports Illustrated described it as a song worth listening to every now and then to "remember what a fantastic track it is", with the song in Undertale contrasting "in the best way possible" to Sans' character for the "all-out" fight.

Several renditions of "Megalovania" have also been produced by other creators and outlets. The original composer for Live A Live, Yoko Shimomura, noted that after Undertale's release many of her fans asked her about the song, and according to Fox at an official concert she performed a remixed rendition of "Megalomania" with "Megalovania" spliced in. The Twitter account for Cult of the Lamb utilized the song in promotional material, with the social media handler using the game's merchandise to sound out "Megalovania"'s notes and encourage sales of it. For Pesterquest, a game set in the Homestuck universe, musician James Roach utilized the melody from "Megalovania" for the track "Yeah It Is". In 2022, "Megalovania" was played at the Vatican as part of a papal audience circus act for Pope Francis.

In a paper titled Undertale: A Case Study in Ludomusicology for the City University of New York, data analyst Matthew Perez acknowledged that while much of its popularity stemmed from its use in Undertale, he felt it worked against Fox's "confusing message about ethics and decision-making in video games", seemingly rewarding the players with the melody. He however praised the track itself, stating its bassline "gives the track a ferocity throughout its various sections, and its varying instrumentation continually refreshes the sonic atmosphere during the combat scenario".

Polygon's Palmer Haasch described the song as having "consistent presence in internet game culture of the late 2010s", which he attributed in part due to Undertale's success and its frequent use in fanmade remixes and "shitposts" that persisted for years, the former of which had formed its own subgenre on YouTube according to Jen Glennon of Inverse. Haasch also noted the song's massive presence on the social media website TikTok, stating that "its repetitive riffs and melodramatic, chiptune-esque palette ... play out well on TikTok because they make sounds memorable and quirky", and worked well with the various meme cultures already forming on the platform, and adaptions of older memes such as rickrolling to incorporate the song. Haasch closed stating that few songs had left a footprint on 2010s internet culture, and that it made an argument for measuring a song's success "not by its chart history, but by its ability to be continuously reinvented". In January 2024, the Guinness World Records certified "Megalovania" as the most streamed track from any video game soundtrack on Spotify, with over 161 million streams by the time of the award being given.
