= Off (video game) =

2008 video game

OFF
- Developers: Unproductive Fun Time; Fangamer (Remake)
- Publishers: Unproductive Fun Time; Fangamer (Remake)
- Designers: Martin Georis Azertip Lithrem; Fangamer (Remake); Dawdling Dog, ltd. (Remake)
- Composers: Alias Conrad Coldwood; Nightmargin (Remake); Morusque (Remake); James Roach (Remake); Camellia (Remake); Exaha (Remake); Toby Fox (Remake); Banshee Beat (Remake)
- Engine: RPG Maker 2003; Unity (Remake)
- Platforms: Microsoft Windows; Mac OS X Nintendo Switch (Remake)
- Release: May 14, 2008; Remake; August 15, 2025
- Genre: Role-playing
- Mode: Single-player

Off (stylized in all caps) is a 2008 role-playing video game developed and published by Belgian team Unproductive Fun Time, consisting of Martin Georis ("Mortis Ghost") and Alias Conrad Coldwood. It is about an enigmatic humanoid entity known as the Batter, who is described as being on a "sacred mission" to "purify" the world of Off. The Batter travels through four bizarre Zones in the world, revealing more about the world as the game goes on.

It gained a substantial following, particularly after its officially sanctioned fan translation into English in 2011, created by Quinn K.

A remake with new content developed by Fangamer was released on August 15, 2025, on Windows and Nintendo Switch. Two physical editions, called Standard Edition and Bad Human Edition, were released on March 27, 2026.

== Gameplay ==
Gameplay screenshot of Off, in which the main character, the Batter, alongside two of his Add-Ons, is fighting a secret boss named Sugar

Off follows similar gameplay principles as those of classic RPGs. The player controls The Batter, moving him across the environments. He can level up, acquire new party members, increase his statistics (such as attack and defense), as well as gain special abilities called "competences".

The game uses an Active Time Battle (ATB) system, where characters and enemies can only act once their respective action bar fills up. In the original version, the player can allow Batter and his Add-Ons to fight automatically (outside of the player's direct control) by selecting the "Auto" option during encounters. This mechanic, however, was removed from the remake.

The battle system also features an unorthodox element system, where rather than "classic" elements often found in RPGs, such as fire or ice, Off uses bizarre elements more commonly thought of as materials: smoke, metal, plastic, meat, and sugar.

There are four numbered Zones, labeled 0–3, along with a fifth zone, The Room, in which the final act of the game takes place. The Zones are only accessible once the player obtains their associated "Zodiac-Cards", which are acquired from the previous Zone's Guardian upon death, and the player traverses between them via a map termed the "nothingness".

One notable feature of Off is the number of puzzles, which go from pushing boulders and inputting numbers to inserting lost pages into books.

== Plot ==
Gameplay screenshot of the original French version of Off, in which the Judge is explaining a block puzzle to The Batter

The player (who is referred to directly) controls The Batter, a man in a baseball uniform. After receiving guidance from The Judge, a talking cat, The Batter proceeds on his journey to "purify the world". He makes his way through four Zones, killing malevolent spectres and eventually the Zone Guardians. After each Zone is purified, scenes of a sick boy named Hugo are shown.

The first Zone consists of towns ruled by Dedan, a vulgar and imposing creature. The Batter purifies the spectres within the smoke mines in the first town, the metal farms in the second, and a post office in the third. The Batter encounters Dedan, who escapes to his office in the final town of the zone. The Batter confronts and defeats him, claiming that the Zone is now purified.

The second Zone is centered around a towering library. After progressing through a shopping mall, an amusement park, and a residential area, The Batter encounters The Judge again. The cat explains that his brother, Valerie, has been calling himself Japhet. Accompanied by The Judge, The Batter returns to the library's roof and fights Japhet, who reveals himself to be a phoenix inhabiting Valerie's corpse. The Batter dispatches Japhet, purifying the Zone.

In the third Zone stands a gigantic sugar factory, which refines sugar from the corpses of the Zones' residents. The Batter progresses to the director's office, meeting the Zone Guardian: a giant man named Enoch. The Batter flees the battle with Enoch and maneuvers through the office building to exhaust him before defeating him, successfully purifying the three Zones.

The last Zone, The Room, consists of abstract, non-linear puzzles all centered around a room that is implied to belong to Hugo. It is revealed that Hugo has an unspecified illness and resents his father for leaving him behind. The Batter meets the Zone Guardians again, now referred to as the Tall Mister (Dedan), The Bird (Japhet), and the Big Mister (Enoch), who now treat The Batter with kindness. The Batter finally encounters The Queen, the Zone Guardians' commander, and the two argue over their "son", implied to be Hugo. The Batter kills her and Hugo before proceeding to a final purified room with a single switch, only to be confronted by The Judge, angry at The Batter and the player for deceiving him and destroying the Zones, effectively wiping his people out of existence. The Judge requests the player's help in defeating The Batter.

In the Special Ending, the player sides with The Judge and kills The Batter, and, during the credits, The Judge is seen sadly walking alone through the now-empty and lifeless purified Zones. In the Official Ending, the player sides with The Batter and kills The Judge, allowing him to flip the switch. Doing so displays the text "The switch is now OFF", and the world fades to black.

A third joke ending revolves around "Space Apes" in a war against brain-like aliens from planet Aurus. The Space Apes describe their plan to construct a giant factory in the now-lifeless world of Off to produce robots capable of killing the aliens. This is a nod to Silent Hill 2's dog ending.

== Development and releases ==
At the beginning of development, the RPG Maker 2003 engine was used by Mortis and a few of his friends; he was living in a flat. Georis went with RPG Maker 2003 as it was the only program he felt he had mastered. Georis lists Killer7, Silent Hill 2, Final Fantasy, Metal Gear Solid 2: Sons of Liberty, Agatha Christie’s novel And Then There Were None, and Myst as inspirations for Off. Georis describes the development of Off as being very spontaneous. Georis viewed Off as a small side project made to work on for fun after focusing on his main discipline of comic creation. There were only vague concepts for the overall plot of Off during the start of development. After publishing a demo on a small internet forum and getting approval from a lot of players, he decided to release a full game in 2008. English translations were later released by fans with the first (called v1.0 by fans) on September 8, 2011.

The Off remake was announced in December 2024. Alias Conrad Coldwood, the original composer of the 2008 release, revealed he would not be involved in its development. Although the remake's publisher, Fangamer, offered to reuse Coldwood's music for the new release, Coldwood refused due to being "nervous about signing". Consequently, a new soundtrack was used for the remake instead, composed by seven composers. It includes tracks created by Toby Fox, Nightmargin, Camellia, and Morusque, as well as Lee Morse's rendition of "If You Want the Rainbow".

== Reception ==
Off has been praised for its story, characters, and atmosphere. Heidi Kemps of PC Gamer described it as "a memorable and haunting RPG, filled with tricky puzzles, bizarre symbolism, and challenging thematic elements." Adam Smith of Rock, Paper, Shotgun compared it to Space Funeral. Off has been compared to the Mother series, though Georis has stated that the resemblance is coincidental as he had never played any of the games until after finishing development.

== Legacy ==
A large fanbase for the game developed on Tumblr; Off became the sixth most reblogged game of 2013, with the first five being AAA games.
