= Toby Fox =

American indie game developer (born 1991)

- Fox holding an Annoying Dog mask in 2017
- Born: Robert F. Fox; October 11, 1991 (age 35); Manchester, New Hampshire, US
- Education: Northeastern University (BS)
- Occupations: Video game developer; composer
- Years active: 2008–present
- Works: Undertale; Deltarune
- Fox's voice Toby Fox discussing playing by ear Recorded April 2012
- Website: toby.fangamer.com

Robert F. "Toby" Fox (born October 11, 1991) is an American indie video game developer and composer. He is best known for creating and scoring the 2015 role-playing video game (RPG) Undertale, as well as Deltarune, a parallel story to Undertale released in chapters since 2018, with five of its planned seven chapters released as of November 2026. Undertale was developed almost entirely by Fox, and has been ranked by numerous publications as one of the greatest video games of all time.

Born in Manchester, New Hampshire, Fox was significantly influenced by the RPG EarthBound (1994) during his childhood, later using RPG Maker to create games with his brothers. Inspired by the fan site Starmen.net, Fox began creating ROM hacks of EarthBound under the username Radiation, releasing the EarthBound Halloween Hack in 2008. Largely a self-taught musician, Fox relearned the piano during middle school to play video game music, joining the music team for Homestuck, a webcomic by Andrew Hussie, in 2010.

While at Northeastern University in Boston, Fox conceived Undertale and Deltarune and successfully raised funds for the former's development through Kickstarter in 2013. Fox continued to develop Undertale until its release two years later, while planning Deltarune's creation. He has composed music for various indie games and musicians, as well as the Pokémon franchise, and became involved with the Japanese game industry through connections with developers. Fox has supported various charities and launched charity fundraisers related to his games.

== Early life ==
Robert F. Fox was born on October 11, 1991, in Manchester, New Hampshire, the third of four brothers. Fox discovered the role-playing video game (RPG) EarthBound at age four, when it was gifted to one of his older brothers for "Christmas or his birthday", and later credited the game with helping him learn how to read. Around age five, he often drew fictional stage layouts based on the Mega Man X series during church services. While Fox attended elementary school, his brothers told him about RPG Maker 2000, and they used the program to create RPGs together, including Fox's first game, Toby's Adventure. He learned about the Touhou Project franchise through a free games website at age 10, and played the demo versions of Embodiment of Scarlet Devil (2002) and Perfect Cherry Blossom (2003) following a recommendation.

Fox's interest in EarthBound grew into an obsession at age 11 after he discovered a fan site for the game, Starmen.net, which motivated him to create things to impress the site's members. He later stated he spent "most of [his] life" on its forum, "making terrible posts and entering stuff in contests". Using the ROM hack editor PK Hack, which he considered his "entrance into [the] community", Fox created his first hack in middle school. Under the username Radiation, he released the EarthBound Halloween Hack in 2008 as part of a ROM hacking competition on Starmen.net, and composed the song "Megalovania" for the hack's soundtrack. When his parents refused to let him attend a yearly Starmen.net forum meetup due to his age, its founder Reid Young advised Fox to threaten to "smoke a cigarette" if he was not allowed to attend. Fox discovered the English fan translation of the RPG OFF (2008) through the site.

Primarily a self-taught musician, Fox began relearning the piano during middle school to play video game music he knew by ear, having previously taken lessons in second grade; he also played the trumpet through high school. Fox told Touhou Project's creator ZUN in an interview that he had received a standing ovation following a piano rendition of "Necrofantasia" from Perfect Cherry Blossom during a high school summer camp gathering. As a high school senior, he began creating piano covers of music from the webcomic Homestuck, leading to its creator Andrew Hussie adding Fox to the music team in 2010, where he later served as its production coordinator. Fox is a graduate of Northeastern University, and studied environmental science.

== Career ==
=== Homestuck ===
[Homestuck] basically launched my career. So... I really owe a lot to Homestuck! It made me better at music, allowed me to make my game, connected me with many important friendships, and it taught me lessons on how to deal with fandom and the importance of valuing your fans.

— Toby Fox in his newsletter, 2025

Fox's first job as a composer was for Homestuck, which he had read since its previous installment, Problem Sleuth. Prior to its release, Hussie made a forum post requesting musicians for their next project, though Fox did not initially respond, stating "at the time I didn't think of myself as a composer." When he asked Hussie whether he could contribute music to Homestuck as the webcomic was becoming popular, Hussie agreed, and remarked having already considered contacting Fox.

Initially sending songs to Hussie as a means to predict Homestuck's storyline, Fox contributed various tracks for the webcomic's soundtrack, including an appearance of "Megalovania". One of Fox's Homestuck works was titled The Baby Is You, a short album where the character Dave Strider becomes pregnant with the main character, John Egbert, created in response to a rule from Hussie on their MS Paint Adventures forum which banned art of pregnant characters. Fox called Homestuck his favorite webcomic in 2012, praising its dialogue and music, but said he did not recommend it to friends because it appealed to a particular audience. He has described Homestuck as having "basically launched [his] career".

Continuing on from Homestuck's music, Fox provided soundtrack contributions for the first act of Hiveswap, a Homestuck spin-off video game funded through a Kickstarter campaign in 2012 and released on September 14, 2017, following multiple delays. He returned to compose for the game's second and third acts in 2020 and 2026, despite initially stating he would not return for the third. In August 2025, Fox was announced as the voice of John Egbert in the Homestuck animated pilot, which released the next month.

=== Undertale (2015) ===
The logo for Undertale

During Fox's third year of university in December 2012, he was inspired to create Undertale after reading a Wikipedia article about the array data structure, later using it to program text and battle systems for an RPG. Development on Undertale started during a break from his classes on January 10, 2013, prioritizing creating the game's battle system first. Undertale's initial development began out of Hussie's basement while Fox simultaneously worked on the Homestuck soundtrack. Fox discovered American artist Temmie Chang's blog while looking for a game artist, and despite having never talked to her before, Fox asked Chang if she wanted to create a game together, to which she agreed. Fox also began writing down design notes and sketching character designs in his school notebook.

Undertale's demo was released in May 2013. Fox created a Kickstarter campaign for Undertale that June with a goal of $5,000, slating the game for a summer 2014 release; the funding goal was met the day of the Kickstarter's launch. The campaign ultimately raised over ten times that amount by its conclusion on July 24, totaling $51,124 (equivalent to $70,661 in 2025) from 2,398 people. Though Fox was initially "unsure if it was humanly possible to create [Undertale] before making the demo," he considerably expanded the game's scope following the demo's release. During Undertale's development in 2014, Fox received his university degree. Fox used the Kickstarter's proceeds to continue working on the game until its release in September 2015. Undertale was Fox's "first full game", and he developed it almost entirely by himself, with Chang serving as the game's lead artist. Describing himself partially as a "control freak", he desired to be able to do everything by himself, without having to rely on others.

Undertale was released on September 15, 2015, to widespread critical acclaim, and has been ranked by numerous publications as one of the best video games of all time. Additionally, the Undertale soundtrack has been named one of the best video game soundtracks. Upon its release on the digital distribution platform Steam, Undertale rapidly gained popularity, selling over 500,000 copies within three months and doubling to one million copies two months later. In GameFAQs's December 2015 "Best. Game. Ever." poll, Undertale won against The Legend of Zelda: Ocarina of Time (1998), the incumbent game from a similar 2009 poll, in a final vote of 156,000 participants. The game was nominated for various other accolades at game award ceremonies following its release, including at the D.I.C.E. Awards, The Game Awards, and the Game Developers Choice Awards.

The rapid rise of the Undertale fandom and its behavior towards those who disliked the game led Fox to comment about the matter on Twitter in January 2016, writing, "It's OK if people don't like the game. I don't care," and expressing hope the game would have an "overall good effect on the world". The next month, Fox gave his approval for Undertale Yellow, an Undertale fan game which released over seven years later in December 2023 due to a period of development hell. That May, internet personality MatPat, the then-host of YouTube series Game Theorists, gifted Pope Francis a Steam key of Undertale during a meeting between the Pope and numerous other YouTubers.

Not only did I not expect this level of popularity, but initially, I was afraid of it. [...] At times, I wished I had a way to quell the attention. I felt a strange powerlessness. (And guilt, for feeling stressed when the success of the game SHOULD be something I'm nothing but ecstatic about.)

— Toby Fox on Tumblr, 2016

Before Undertale's first anniversary, Fox made a retrospective post on Tumblr describing his feelings about the game's success and the stress the attention brought him, further referring to Undertale as "about an 8/10, niche RPG game." The Undertale Art Book, which contained concept art and development commentary from Fox, was released through Fangamer in November 2016. Fox was included on Forbes's 2018 list of 30 Under 30 in Games in November 2017 for his work on Undertale. During a making-of interview about Undertale with the magazine Edge in January 2018, Fox expressed happiness that many people were able to enjoy Undertale, including children excited about the game, though he remarked "my life has changed permanently and will never change back."

=== Deltarune (2018–present) ===
The logo for Deltarune

While sick at home from university in 2011, Fox had a fever dream about an ending for a video game, after which he became obsessed with "making a game with that ending"; he created Deltarune's initial concept in 2012, though abandoned development before finishing a single room, with some of its music becoming part of Undertale's soundtrack. While Undertale's Kickstarter campaign was underway, Fox decided his next game would be "a mix of Undertale and that dream concept." Fox began working on Deltarune's demo, which became the game's first chapter, in 2014. Over the next year, prior to Undertale's release, Fox began creating concept art and sketches for Deltarune's main characters. Fox planned content for later parts of the game up to a decade in advance.

For the past 3 years I've been waking up in the middle of the night unable to go back to sleep because I've been thinking about the scenes that happen in the game. Even though so many details are still hazy, I really want to show you the things I've been thinking about. [...] If I don't show you what I'm thinking, I'll lose my mind.

— Toby Fox on Twitter, 2018

On October 30, 2018, Fox asked "those who completed Undertale" to view the official Undertale Twitter account. The next day, Fox unveiled a "survey program" available for free through the deltarune.com website, which was revealed to be Deltarune's first chapter. Fox subsequently explained on Twitter that Deltarune was separate from Undertale's world, and that no work beyond the first chapter had been done; he further sought to assemble a development team to assist him with creating the game. Although Fox continued writing dialogue and composing music, he disclosed in a February 2019 Indie World interview that Chapter 2's progress was "effectively 0%", and its development team had not been formed. For Undertale's fourth anniversary, Fox shared new songs from Deltarune, further announcing progression in the game's design.

Fox had long suffered from chronic hand and wrist pain, though his symptoms became severe during Deltarune Chapter 2's development in early 2020, which made it difficult for him to write and compose. Fox stated Deltarune's overall outline had been completed in a September 2020 development update. While Chapter 1 was programmed solely by Fox, with Chang returning for art, the development team was expanded for Chapter 2 onwards, in order to speed up production and due to Fox's wrist issues. Chapter 2 was announced on a livestream hosted by Fangamer for Undertale's sixth anniversary on September 15, 2021, and released two days later. Fox opted to release the chapter for free, stating "the world has been really tough for everybody recently," though he added the game's full release would be paid and was "definitely going to cost more than Undertale." Fox stated that Chapters 3–5 would be made available simultaneously after the game's paid release, and Deltarune would span seven chapters.

In November 2022, Fox started an email mailing list that allowed others to sign up for a seasonal Undertale / Deltarune newsletter featuring new information about Deltarune, with its first issue being released the following month. Further development updates were provided between newsletters, with Fox stating in the Halloween 2023 issue that work on Chapter 3 was "nearing completion", also revealing that Deltarune's paid version would be available for purchase after Chapter 4 was finished, rescheduling Chapter 5 for a later release.

Following more updates via the newsletter throughout 2023 and 2024, Fox confirmed in late 2024 that Chapters 3 and 4 would "100% come out in 2025". Their release date was announced in the April 2025 Nintendo Direct for the Nintendo Switch 2, releasing them bundled in with the first two as a paid game on June 4, 2025, serving as a Nintendo Switch 2 launch title. Fox confirmed that future chapters would be free updates to the paid game, and revealed that Chapter 5 was planned to release in 2026. On June 9, 2026, Chapter 5 appeared in a Nintendo Direct, where its release date of June 24 was announced. The same month, Fox also stated that Chapter 6 was planned to release in 2027, and projected Chapter 7's development to begin before the end of 2026.

Deltarune has remained a highly anticipated game throughout its development despite the years-long wait between new chapters. The game's popularity has grown with each chapter's release; after the demo's free launch on Steam alongside Chapter 2, SteamDB reported a peak of 102,916 concurrent players, with the figure rising to 133,930 following the first four chapters' paid release, which reportedly crashed Steam's store page. Upon the release of Chapter 5, it reached a further peak of 291,816 concurrent players, becoming one of Steam's top ten most played games at that time.

=== Japanese game industry ===
Fox befriended Onion Games founder and Moon: Remix RPG Adventure (1997) designer Yoshiro Kimura after Onion Games launched an English Twitter account in 2013. Kimura played Undertale's demo at Fox's request, after which they began playtesting each other's games. Prior to Undertale's release, Fox told Clyde "Tomato" Mandelin, who co-founded Starmen.net and worked on the Mother 3 fan translation, about his intention to release the game in Japanese at some point. He publicly confirmed his desire to release Undertale in Japanese in a December 2015 interview with AUTOMATON MEDIA. Initially unsure about who to hire for Undertale's Japanese localization, Fox eventually worked with 8-4, Ltd. after a recommendation by Starmen.net co-founder Reid Young, who had since established the merchandising company Fangamer.

Work on Undertale's Japanese localization started in February 2016 and lasted a year and a half, with Fox closely involved and providing detailed translation notes; it released on August 16, 2017. NieR creator Yoko Taro was the first to play Undertale in Japanese, having heard about it after the demo's release but deciding to wait until the localization, interviewing Fox prior to its release. Kimura introduced Fox to Touhou Project creator ZUN, and the three held a round table interview through Denfaminico Gamer in October 2018. Deltarune was simultaneously made available in English and Japanese following the first chapter's release that month. Fox said in an interview with Indie World that he personally checks every line of the Deltarune Japanese translation.

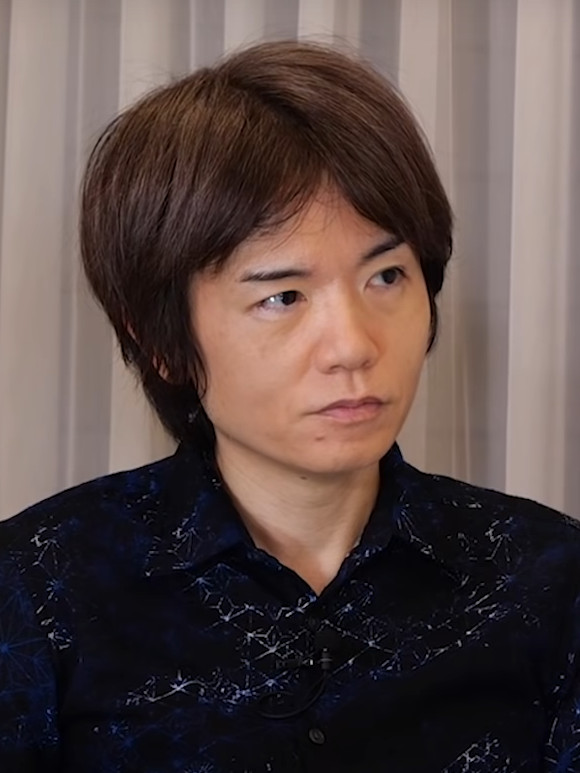
Super Smash Bros. creator Masahiro Sakurai called Fox the best guest he played against.

During a Nintendo Direct on September 4, 2019, it was announced that Sans from Undertale would be added into Super Smash Bros. Ultimate (2018) as a downloadable content (DLC) costume for the Mii Fighter character, alongside a new arrangement of "Megalovania" by Fox. Series creator Masahiro Sakurai highlighted Sans' popularity as a character request, further revealing that he had invited and driven Fox to his home, where they played Ultimate and spoke together in Japanese. Fox called the visit "one of the most surreal (and fun) experiences of my life", saying that he would "never forget it". Kimura was motivated by Fox to release Moon outside of Japan after a previous failed localization attempt following its 1997 release, and the game was re-released on the Nintendo Switch in August 2020.

In May 2021, Sakurai announced his column in Famitsu would conclude following the release of Ultimate's final DLC characters, and ended the column that November after having published over 600 articles since 2003. Fox took over Sakurai's role and began publishing the "Secret Base" column starting in September 2022, with topics including his childhood game development, reader-submitted questions that Fox would answer, as well as the first-ever interview with Kikiyama, the pseudonymous developer of Yume Nikki (2004). When Sakurai launched an English version of his game development YouTube channel, localized by 8-4, he remarked Fox had provided him with 8-4's contact info. From 2024 until its 2026 discontinuation, Fox participated as a judge for Sakurai's "Game Designers Award" panel at the Japan Game Awards.

Kimura told the news site PC Gamer in an interview that he was inspired to create another RPG following 1997's Moon after playing Undertale, and released Stray Children in 2025. Fox's decision to only officially localize his games in Japanese became subject to controversy among some Latin American fans in March 2026 after he promoted OFF's Japanese translation. He responded in a statement on Bluesky, where he stated he wanted official localizations to "match [his] vision", remarking that he was only able to release the Japanese version due to him speaking the language, though he praised fan translations, noting that they can exist without being "officially perfect". An Undertale museum exhibition scheduled to launch in Tokyo and Osaka in 2027 was supervised by Fox.

== Other projects ==
In December 2016, Fox was announced as a writer for the first issue of A Profound Waste of Time, a video game magazine fundraised on Kickstarter. Fox returned as a contributor for its third issue in November 2023. Japanese musician Itoki Hana, who had reached out to Fox via email years earlier to present her Undertale song remixes, featured Fox as a composer and background vocalist for the song "74" from her August 2018 debut album Pray, marking his first time composing and singing for another musician.

Wrestler Kenny Omega, whom Fox had previously met at a Tokyo Game Show event, collaborated with him to produce an Undertale-styled video advertising Omega's appearance at Wrestle Kingdom 13 on January 4, 2019. Omega commissioned an entrance video from Fox for AEW Dynamite's Halloween 2019 episode, where Omega dressed up as Sans and walked out on stage to "Megalovania". Pollyanna, a Mother tribute comic featuring a contribution from the series' creator Shigesato Itoi, was released in June 2020 and included Fox among its 35 artists. He was also an artist for its 2021 sequel. Fox animated and directed Mother composer Hirokazu Tanaka's "Hammerhead Shark Song" music video, released in July 2020.

Throughout 2022, Fox composed for a Pocari Sweat commercial with imase and PUNPEE, and wrote and composed the song "Skies Forever Blue" with Itoki Hana and Omocat. Fox and Hana collaborated again on the song "The Greatest Living Show" in 2023. He made his voice acting debut as the skeleton Jared in the We Baby Bears episode "Polly's New Crew" that year, stating in his newsletter "it's always been a dream of mine to be a voice actor in cartoons." He composed the music for the farm life simulation RPG Fields of Mistria's June 2023 announcement trailer. Fox collaborated with Japanese musician Camellia on the song "Myths You Forgot". Also with Camellia, he composed songs for two VTubers affiliated with the Hololive agency in 2024, including "Fallen Wing" with Amane Kanata, and "Dead Ma'am's Chest" with Houshou Marine. Concerts featuring Undertale's music have been planned and curated by Fox, including Undertale: The Determination Symphony, a concert tour which began on August 23, 2026.

=== Other video games ===
The visual novel Rose of Winter, which was released in September 2016, features tracks composed by Fox. In 2019, Fox composed tracks for YIIK: A Postmodern RPG, Temmie Chang's debut game Escaped Chasm, and Game Freak's RPG Little Town Hero, on which Fox's music was arranged by veteran Pokémon composer Hitomi Sato. He additionally composed a song for Pokémon Sword and Shield that year, which the website Polygon remarked sounded similar to a track from The Baby Is You. Fox returned as a composer for Chang's second game, Dweller's Empty Path, in July 2020. He announced in June 2022 that he would be composing music for Pokémon Scarlet and Violet, and wrote five tracks for its soundtrack. In December 2023, Fox remixed Ed Sheeran's song "Celestial", which appeared in Pokémon Scarlet and Violet's credits, for the game's DLC The Indigo Disk.

Fox collaborated with Camellia on the song "Summerblue" for the 2022 rhythm game beatmania IIDX 30 Resident. He continued working with Camellia for the Sega arcade rhythm game Chunithm Verse, composing the song "Theatore Creatore", which released in December 2024. Laura Shigihara, who composed for Deltarune, included a track by Fox on her game Mr. Saitou, released in March 2023. ZUN and Fox's first collaboration, the song "U.N. Owen Was Hero?" for the rhythm game Touhou Danmaku Kagura: Phantasia Lost, which combined the songs "U.N. Owen Was Her?" from Touhou and "Battle Against a True Hero" from Undertale, was announced in January 2024. Their second Phantasia Lost collaboration released in 2025, where they arranged songs from each other's franchises, with Fox arranging "Necrofantasia" from Touhou, and ZUN arranging "Megalovania" from Undertale. Due to OFF's composer Alias Conrad Coldwood not signing over rights to his music for the game's remaster, but approving of a new soundtrack, Fox was announced as a composer for new tracks in January 2025.

== Influences and style ==
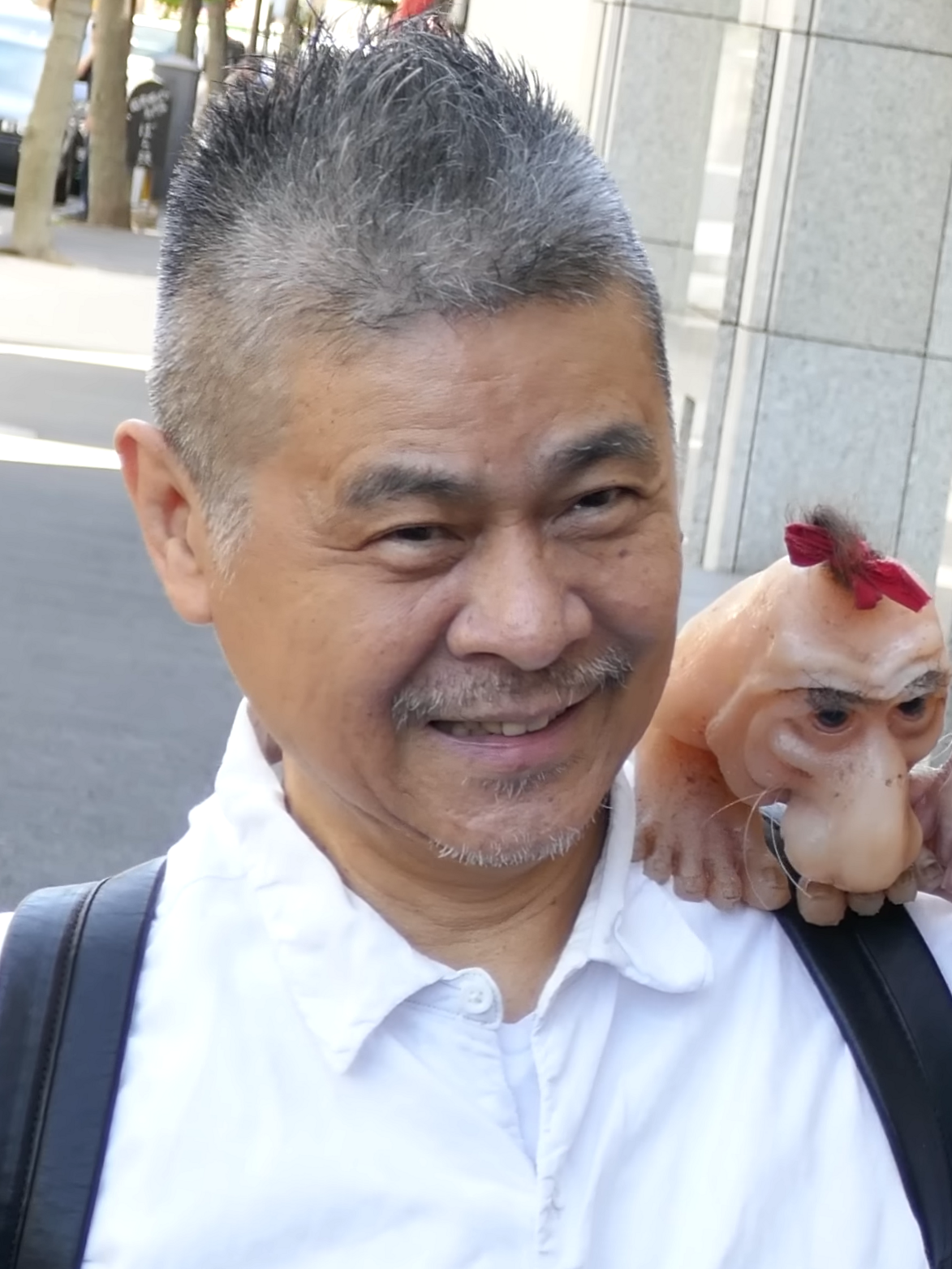
Fox's primary influences were ZUN's Touhou Project series and Shigesato Itoi's Mother series.

Fox, a fan of Japanese video games since childhood, has listed EarthBound from the Mother series and Touhou Project among his primary influences. Several other games that particularly influenced Undertale's creation are Shin Megami Tensei, Brandish, the Mario & Luigi RPGs, and Cave Story (2004). Despite not having played the game, Fox listed Moon: Remix RPG Adventure as another influence. Mother particularly stood out to him for its "perfect balance between humor and seriousness", and he highlighted its music as his greatest musical influence. He further praised EarthBound and its ability to evoke emotions in players, in spite of its "weird off-brand Charlie Brown game" appearance. Fox has named composers Yasunori Mitsuda and Hiroki Kikuta as musical influences.

Some gameplay mechanics in Undertale were drawn from other games; the ability to talk to and spare enemies instead of fighting them was inspired by Shin Megami Tensei. Fox described the creation of Undertale's combination of shoot 'em up and RPG gameplay as being out of love for Super Mario RPG (1996) and Touhou. He chose to avoid turning Undertale's combat into a bullet hell similar to Touhou, and used smaller, less dense bullet patterns reflecting an enemy's personality. Desiring gameplay with more complexity than Super Mario RPG's timed button presses, Fox compared these "bite-sized" bullet patterns to WarioWare.

Describing himself as musically "inspired by everything I listen to", Fox gained an understanding of music theory while attempting to learn video game music, focusing on the emotions certain chord progressions invoke. Fox used this approach to write music in his games; some of Undertale's music was composed prior to Fox starting work on the game, with various story beats and main character themes written to fit a given situation or emotion. His music utilizes numerous leitmotifs as a narrative tool to represent characters, locations, and themes. Undertale's soundtrack was recorded using free soundfonts and synths that he found online.

Sometimes it does feel really hard to be working on games and think like, 'What is the f*****g [sic] point of this when all of these horrible things are happening? Why am I working on games instead of out there fighting?'

— Toby Fox to NPR, 2020

Fox considers his game creation process to be atypical of traditional RPG development, but has acknowledged "clearly many people are pleased with the result." He describes his creative process as "random", stating in 2016 that he does not have a work routine. Fox has called programming his weak point. His approach to humor and writing jokes in his games is based simply on whether or not he finds something funny. When asked by National Public Radio (NPR) about the importance of making and writing video games, Fox likened entertainment to "mental medicine", and stated that games could be a way to give others hope, as long as creating them does not lead to ignorance about the world.

== Personal life ==
Fox often hides his face, using the Annoying Dog character (face shown) as a self-insert.

As of 2018, Fox lives in Boston, Massachusetts. He can speak Japanese, and has visited Japan multiple times for travel and work. Game Informer remarked that, in spite of his popularity, Fox is "a very private person, hiding his face from the internet." By his own admission, Fox dislikes interview questions, only occasionally doing interviews. Fox has worn a mask to protect his privacy, and described feeling socially anxious and overwhelmed by the thought of fans surrounding him.

While Fox's wrist pain has improved over the course of Deltarune's development, he began using voice-to-text software to compensate for being unable to type for extended periods, and remarked the game would not be possible to release by himself due to his physical condition. Fox called Super Smash Bros. Melee (2001) his most-played game in his life in 2015, and plays as Captain Falcon, his favorite character. Despite being a "dog person", Fox owned a cat in 2015, and mentioned having a cat named Kikky in 2026.

=== Philanthropy ===
During an Undertale speedrun at the Games Done Quick event AGDQ 2017, Fox made a $10,000 donation. Undertale has been part of several Humble Bundles, collections of games sold to support charity, including two that donated all proceeds to coronavirus relief during the COVID-19 pandemic, with the bundles raising $6.5 million in 2020 and $1.1 million in 2021. To commemorate Undertale's 7th anniversary in 2022, Fox held the "Spamton Sweepstakes" charity auction through Deltarune's website on September 17, in collaboration with Fangamer, and in support of Child's Play and Pakistan Children Relief. The event ultimately raised $322,805.68.

Following a copyright dispute between the team of Undertale fan game Undertale Yellow and Materia Collective's CEO Sebastian Wolff over the use of Fox's music in the game, Fox donated $20,000 to AbleGamers as a token of apology in January 2024. For Undertale's 10th anniversary, Fangamer and Fox held a two-day livestream in support of Médecins Sans Frontières (Doctors Without Borders) on September 21 and 22, 2025, holding auctions for collectables and featuring new in-game content exclusive to the stream. This livestream raised $361,407 across both days.

== Notable works ==
=== Video games ===
Year	Game	Role			Platforms	Ref.
Year	Game	Director	Composer	Writer	Platforms	Ref.
2008	EarthBound Halloween Hack	Yes	Yes	Yes	Super Nintendo (ROM hack)	
2015	Undertale	Yes	Yes	Yes	Windows, macOS, Linux, PlayStation 4, PlayStation Vita, Nintendo Switch, Xbox One	
2016	Rose of Winter	No	Yes	No	Windows	
2017–present	Hiveswap	No	Yes	No	Linux, macOS, Windows	
2018–present	Deltarune	Yes	Yes	Yes	macOS, Windows, Nintendo Switch, PlayStation 4, PlayStation 5, Nintendo Switch 2	
2019	Escaped Chasm	No	Yes	No	Windows	
2019	Little Town Hero	No	Yes	No	Nintendo Switch, PlayStation 4, Xbox One, Windows	
2020	Dweller's Empty Path	No	Yes	No	Windows	
2022	Pokémon Scarlet and Violet	No	Yes	No	Nintendo Switch	
2025	Off (remaster)	No	Yes	No	Nintendo Switch, Windows	

Guest composer

- YIIK: A Postmodern RPG (2019)
- Super Smash Bros. Ultimate (2019) – DLC only
- Pokémon Sword and Shield (2019)
- Omori (2020) – jukebox music only
- beatmania IIDX 30 Resident (2022) – in collaboration with Camellia
- Mr. Saitou (2023)
- Pokémon Scarlet and Violet: The Indigo Disk (2023)
- Touhou Danmaku Kagura: Phantasia Lost (2024) – in collaboration with ZUN
- Chunithm Verse (2024) – in collaboration with Camellia

=== Other credits ===
Year	Media type	Media title	Role	Notes	Ref.
2010–2016	Webcomic	Homestuck	Composer		
2010	Album	The Baby Is You	Writer, composer, vocalist	Fan album made for Homestuck	
2018	Magazine	A Profound Waste of Time (issue 1)	Contributor		
2018	Album	Pray	Guest composer, lyricist and vocalist	In collaboration with Itoki Hana	
2019	Promotional video	Kenny's Quest	Co-creator	In collaboration with Kenny Omega	
2020	Comic	Hobonichi Mother Project Pollyanna comic	Contributor		
2020	Music video	Chip Tanaka/Hammerhead Shark Song	Director/animator (music video)		
2021	Comic	Hobonichi Mother Project Pollyanna comic sequel	Contributor		
2021	Song	"Myths You Forgot"	Featured artist	In collaboration with Camellia	
2022	Song	"Skies Forever Blue"	Composer, writer	In collaboration with Itoki Hana	
2022	Commercial	Pocari Sweat	Composer	In collaboration with PUNPEE and imase	
2023	Song	"The Greatest Living Show"	Composer, writer	In collaboration with Itoki Hana	
2023	Animated television series	We Baby Bears	Voice actor (Jared; 2 episodes)		
2023	Trailer	Fields of Mistria Announcement Trailer	Composer		
2023	Magazine	A Profound Waste of Time (issue 3)	Contributor		
2023	Film	EarthBound USA	Interviewee		
2024	Song	"Fallen Wing"	Composer	As a guest composer for Hololive VTuber Amane Kanata's Unknown DIVA album, with Camellia	
2024	Song	"Dead Ma'am's Chest"	Composer	In collaboration with Hololive VTuber Houshou Marine and Camellia	
2025	Web series	Homestuck: The Animated Pilot	Composer, executive producer, voice actor (John Egbert)	Credited as Toby "Radiation" Fox	
