= Undertale =

2015 video game

- Developer: Toby Fox (Note: 8-4 developed the console versions.)
- Publishers: Toby Fox (Note: Self-published on PC version); 8-4 (Note: 8-4 published the console versions.)
- Designer: Toby Fox
- Artists: Temmie Chang; Toby Fox
- Composer: Toby Fox
- Engine: GameMaker Studio
- Platforms: OS X; Windows; Linux; PlayStation 4; PlayStation Vita; Nintendo Switch; Xbox One
- Release: September 15, 2015: OS X, Windows; September 15, 2015; Linux; July 17, 2016; PS4, PS Vita; August 15, 2017; Nintendo Switch; September 18, 2018; Xbox One; March 16, 2021
- Genre: Role-playing
- Mode: Single-player

Undertale (Note: Stylized in all caps) is a 2015 role-playing video game created by American indie developer Toby Fox. The player controls a child who has fallen into the Underground: a large, secluded region under the surface of the Earth, separated by a magical barrier. The player meets various monsters during the journey back to the surface, some of which may engage in combat. The combat system involves the player navigating through mini–bullet hell attacks by the opponent. They can opt to appease monsters in order to spare them instead of killing them. These choices affect the game, with the dialogue, characters, and story changing based on outcomes.

Outside of artwork and character designs by Temmie Chang and other guest designers, Fox developed the entirety of the game by himself, including the script and music. The game took inspiration from several sources, including the Brandish, Mario & Luigi, and Mother role-playing game series, bullet hell shooter series Touhou Project, and the role-playing game Moon: Remix RPG Adventure. Undertale was originally meant to be two hours in length and was set to be released in mid-2014.

Undertale was released for OS X and Windows in September 2015. It was ported to Linux in 2016, PlayStation 4 and PlayStation Vita in 2017, the Nintendo Switch in 2018, and Xbox One in 2021. The game was acclaimed for its thematic material, combat system, musical score, originality, story, dialogue, and characters, although reaction to the art style was mixed. It has sold at least five million copies. It was nominated for multiple accolades, including game of the year from several gaming publications and conventions, and is considered one of the greatest video games ever made. A spin-off game with a parallel story, Deltarune, has been released episodically since 2018.

== Gameplay ==
Undertale employs a bullet hell/turn-based combat system in which the player controls the heart, avoiding attacks from enemies in between fighting, acting and sparing enemies, or using items.

Undertale is a role-playing video game that uses a top-down perspective. In the game, the player controls a child and completes objectives in order to progress through the story. Players explore an underground world filled with towns and caves, and are required to solve numerous puzzles on their journey. The underground world is the home of monsters, many of whom challenge the player in combat; players decide whether to kill, flee from, or befriend them. Choices made by the player radically affect the plot and general progression of the game, with the player's morality acting as the cornerstone for the game's development.

When players encounter enemies in either scripted events or random encounters, they enter a battle mode. During battles, players control a small heart which represents their soul, and must avoid attacks unleashed by the opposing monster similar to a bullet hell shooter. As the game progresses, new elements are introduced, such as colored obstacles, and boss battles which change the way players control the heart. Players may choose to attack the enemy, which involves timed button presses. Killing enemies will cause the player to earn EXP (in turn increasing their LOVE) and gold. They can use the ACT option to check an enemy's attacking and defending attributes as well as perform various other actions, which vary depending on the enemy. If the player uses the right actions to respond to the enemy, or attacks them until they have low HP (but are still alive), they can then choose to spare them and end the fight without killing them. For some boss encounters to be completed peacefully, the player is required to survive until the character they are facing has finished their dialogue. The game features multiple story branches and endings depending on whether players choose to kill or spare their enemies; and as such, it is possible to clear the game without killing a single enemy.

Monsters will talk to the player during the battle, and the game will tell the players what the monster's feelings and actions are. Enemy attacks change based on how players interact with them, including the difficulty level. The game relies on a number of metafictional elements in both its gameplay and story. When players participate in a boss battle on a second playthrough, the dialogue will be altered depending on actions in previous playthroughs.

== Plot ==
Undertale is set in the Underground, a realm where monsters were banished after war broke out with humans before the events of the game. The Underground is sealed from the surface by a magic barrier with a singular gap at Mount Ebott. At the start of the game a human child falls into the Underground from Mount Ebott and encounters Flowey, a sentient flower who teaches the player the game's mechanics and lies about "LV", or "LOVE", in an attempt to kill them. The human is then rescued by Toriel, a motherly goat-like monster, who teaches them how to survive conflict in the Underground without killing. She intends to adopt the human, wanting to protect them from Asgore, the king of the Underground.

The human eventually leaves Toriel to search for Asgore's castle, which contains the barrier to the surface world. They encounter several monsters, such as the skeletons Sans and Papyrus, two brothers who act as sentries for the Snowdin forest; Undyne, the head of the royal guard; Alphys, the kingdom's royal scientist; and Mettaton, a robotic television host Alphys created. Most of the monsters are fought, with the human choosing whether to kill them or to spare and possibly befriend the monster. During their travels, the human learns that many years ago, Asriel, the son of Asgore and Toriel, befriended the first human who fell into the Underground. When the child abruptly died, Asriel used the child's soul to pass through the barrier, intending to return the body to the surface. The humans living there attacked and killed Asriel, causing Asgore to declare war. In the present day, Asgore has collected six souls from fallen humans, and needs one more to destroy the barrier.

The game's ending depends on how the player handles encounters with monsters. (Note: The three endings are referred to as, respectively: the "neutral run"; the "true pacifist run"; and the "genocide run" (less commonly known as the "no mercy run").) If the player killed some but not all monsters, or did not kill any, they experience the "Neutral" ending. The human arrives at Asgore's castle and is forced to fight him. Sans stops the human before their confrontation, revealing that the human's "LOVE" and "EXP" are acronyms for "level of violence" and "execution points", respectively. (Note: In role-playing games, "LV" and "EXP" are abbreviations for "[experience] level" and "experience points", respectively, and are desirable to increase.) Sans judges the human based on their accumulated "LOVE" and "EXP". The human then fights Asgore, but Flowey interrupts, killing Asgore, and transforming into a more powerful, grotesque form by stealing the human souls. With the aid of the rebelling souls, the human defeats Flowey and can choose to either kill or spare him. The human then leaves the underground. They later receive a phone call from Sans, explaining the state of the Underground after the human's departure.

If the player kills no monsters before completing a "neutral" ending, they can reload their saved game to complete the "true pacifist" ending. Flowey is revealed to be a reincarnation of Asriel created by Alphys' experiments. Right before the fight with Asgore, Toriel stops the battle and is joined by the other monsters the human befriended. Flowey ambushes the group, absorbing the souls of all the humans and monsters in order to take an older Asriel's form. During the ensuing fight, the human manages to connect with the souls of their friends, and eventually defeats Asriel: He reverts to his child form, destroys the barrier, and expresses remorse for his actions before leaving, revealing the human's true name as Frisk. The human falls unconscious and is awoken to see their friends surrounding them. The monsters peacefully reintegrate with the humans, while the human has the option of accepting Toriel as their adoptive mother.

A third ending, known by fans as the "No Mercy" or "Genocide" ending, ensues if the player kills every single fightable monster. They must repeatedly trigger random encounters in each area until no more monsters remain. This route changes aspects of the game: many characters evacuate to escape the player, and those that remain have modified dialogue reflecting the impact their actions are having on the game's world. When the human reaches Asgore's castle, Sans attempts to stop them, but fails and is slain. Flowey kills Asgore in an attempt to obtain mercy, but is killed by the human. Chara, (Note: This character is named by the player, with the chosen name used for the player's save file. "Chara" is referred to as their "true name" on the naming screen.) the first fallen child who befriended Asriel, then appears and erases the world. To enable further replays of the game, the player must give their soul to Chara, restoring the world and causing a permanent alteration to the true pacifist ending.

== Development ==
Developer Toby Fox in 2017

Undertale was developed by Toby Fox across 32 months. Development was financed through a crowdfunding campaign on the website Kickstarter. The campaign was launched on June 24, 2013, with a goal of US$5,000; it ended on July 24, 2013, with US$51,124 raised by 2,398 people. Fox had little experience with game development; he and his three brothers often used RPG Maker 2000 to make role-playing games, though few were ever completed. Fox also worked on EarthBound ROM hacks while in high school, including the EarthBound Halloween Hack, released in 2008. Before the release of Undertale, he was best known for composing music for the webcomic Homestuck, starting in 2010. Undertale was the first full game that he wrote. The title Undertale was inspired from Fox's observation that EarthBound and Homestuck were both made up of two words stuck together. Fox wanted the name of the game to be "similarly catchy". Another inspiration of the name for Undertale comes from the game Cave Story, where Fox swapped out the name "story" with "tale" due to the words meaning the same thing and Fox replacing "Cave" with "Under" in the game's name due to the game taking place underground.

According to Fox, he was casually reading Wikipedia in December 2012 when he found its article for array data structures, something Fox did not have knowledge of. After reading the page, he thought about how he could use it to create a text system for an RPG. After completing it, he came up with the idea of creating a battle system. This system, which was created using the game creation system GameMaker: Studio, informed how Fox wrote the story, as both are intertwined. He wanted to develop a role-playing game that was different from the traditional design, which he often found "boring to play" despite his love for JRPGs. He set out to develop a game with "interesting characters", and that "utilizes the medium as a storytelling device ... instead of having the story and gameplay abstractions be completely separate".

Fox worked on the entire game independently, besides some of the art; he decided to do so to avoid relying on others. Temmie Chang worked as the main artist for the game, providing most of the sprites and concept art. Fox has said that the game's art style would likely remain the same if he had access to a larger team of artists. He found that "there's a psychological thread that says audiences become more attached to characters drawn simply rather than in detail", particularly benefiting from the use of visual gags within the art. Retrospectively, Fox described Undertale as "a huge katamari of things that [he likes] that [he] combined arbitrarily", adding that part of the story "was almost written improvisationally at the last minute".

=== Game design ===
The defensive segment within the battle system was inspired by the Mario & Luigi series, as well as bullet hell shooters such as the Touhou Project series. When working on the battle system, Fox set out to create a mechanic that he would personally enjoy. He wanted Undertale to have a battle system equally engaging as Super Mario RPG (1996) and Mario & Luigi: Superstar Saga (2003). Fox did not want grinding to be necessary at any point in the game, instead leaving it optional to players. He also did not wish to introduce fetch quests, as they involve backtracking, which he dislikes. In terms of the game's difficulty, Fox ensured that it was easy and engaging. He asked some friends who are inexperienced with bullet hell shooters to test the game, and found that they were able to complete it. He felt that the game's difficulty was optimal, particularly considering the complications involved in adding another difficulty setting.

The game's dialogue system was inspired by Shin Megami Tensei (1992), particularly the gameplay mechanic whereby players can talk to monsters to avoid conflict. Fox intended to expand upon this mechanic, as failing to negotiate resulted in a requirement to fight. "I want to create a system that satisfied my urge for talking to monsters", he said. When he began developing this mechanic, the concept of completing the game without killing any enemies "just evolved naturally". However, he never considered removing the option to fight throughout development. When questioned on the difficulty of playing the game without killing, Fox responded that it is "the crux of one of the major themes of this game", asking players to think about it themselves. Despite not having played it, Fox was inspired by the concepts of Moon: Remix RPG Adventure (1997), which involved the player repairing the damage of the "Hero" and increasing their "Love Level" by helping people instead of hurting them. Fox also cited Cave Story (2004) as a general inspiration for the game.

=== Writing ===
According to Fox, the "idea of being trapped in an underground world" was inspired by the video game Brandish. Fox was partly influenced by the silliness of internet culture, as well as comedy shows like Mr. Bean. He was also inspired by the unsettling atmosphere of EarthBound. Fox's desire to "subvert concepts that go unquestioned in many games" further influenced Undertale's development. Fox found that the writing became easier after establishing a character's voice and mood. He also felt that creating the world was a natural process, as it expressed the stories of those within it. Fox felt the importance to make the game's monsters "feel like an individual". He cited the Final Fantasy series as the opposite; "all monsters in RPGs like Final Fantasy are the same ... there's no meaning to that".

The character of Toriel, who is one of the first to appear in the game, was created as a parody of tutorial characters. Fox strongly disliked the use of the companion character Fi in The Legend of Zelda: Skyward Sword, in which the answers to puzzles were often revealed early. Fox also felt that role-playing video games generally lack strong mother characters; in the Pokémon series, as well as Mother, Fox felt that the mothers are used as "symbols rather than characters". In response, Fox intended for Toriel's character to be "a mom that hopefully acts like a mom", and "genuinely cares" about players' actions. Initially, Toriel had to be killed in order to progress the game, but Fox changed it before the release of Undertale's demo. He felt that it was wrong that the only way to progress was killing Toriel; this decision influenced Fox to implement the option to spare monsters as it made Fox understand what "Undertale was really about."

Papyrus and Sans are named after the typefaces Papyrus and Comic Sans, and their in-game dialogue is displayed accordingly in their respective eponymous fonts. Both characters are listed in the game's credits as being inspired by J. N. Wiedle, author of Helvetica, a webcomic series about a skeleton named after the font of the same name. Papyrus in particular was conceived as a sketch in Fox's notebook; he was originally a mean-spirited character named "Times New Roman" who wears a fedora. Sans originally ran poker at a casino and was going to tell more puns but Fox knew that it would not be funny as he originally thought it would be. The idea of Sans with a casino would be revisited in the Xbox One port, where Sans runs a casino at his and Papyrus's house. According to Fox, the most memorable part of making Undertale was when Papyrus rejects Frisk during their date. It was originally more harsh than in the final game, this was changed due to one of the game's playtesters, a friend of Fox and a fan who loved Papyrus' character, crying during the Papyrus rejection scene.

During the game's development, Fox found Undyne to be a difficult character to write; he tried to give her various accents and hobbies, and the only detail that stayed consistent was that she was the first boss to actively want to kill the protagonist. Alphys was originally depicted as a man but Toby grew to dislike it, so Alphys ended up as a woman and had eyelashes added to her design. Asgore was initially intended to be an intimidating character but was changed to be more goofy, inspired by his friend, Reid Young, the founder of Fangamer.

=== Music ===
"Hopes and Dreams"
"Hopes and Dreams", a song from one of the game's final boss fights, was praised for reintroducing many of the game's previous themes in a different style.

The game's soundtrack was entirely composed by Fox with FL Studio. A self-taught musician, he composed most of the tracks with little iteration; the game's main theme, "Undertale", was the only song to undergo multiple iterations in development. The soundtrack was inspired by music from Super NES role-playing games, such as EarthBound, bullet hell series Touhou Project, and the webcomic Homestuck, for which Fox provided some of the music. Fox also stated that he tries to be inspired by all music he listens to, particularly those in video games. According to Fox, over 90% of the songs were composed specifically for the game. "Megalovania", the song used during the boss battle with Sans, had previously been used within Homestuck and in one of Fox's EarthBound ROM hacks. For each section of the game, Fox composed the music prior to programming, as it helped "decide how the scene should go". He initially tried using the music tracker FamiTracker to compose the soundtrack, but found it difficult to use, claiming that he does not like trackers and that he "never found them very intuitive". He ultimately decided to play segments of the music separately, and connect them on a track. To celebrate the first anniversary of the game, Fox released five unused musical works on his blog in 2016. Four of the game's songs were released as official downloadable content for the Steam version of Taito's Groove Coaster.

The Undertale soundtrack was positively received as a key factor in the game's success, specifically for its extensive use of character leitmotifs across multiple tracks. "Hopes and Dreams", the boss theme when fighting Asriel in the Pacifist route, interpolates most of the main character's themes, and is "a perfect way to cap off your journey", according to USgamer's Nadia Oxford. Oxford notes this track especially demonstrates Fox's ability at "turning old songs into completely new experiences", used throughout the game's score. Tyler Hicks of GameSpot compared the music to "bit-based melodies". The Undertale soundtrack has frequently been covered by various styles and groups.

As part of the fifth anniversary of the game, Fox streamed footage with permission of a 2019 concert of the Undertale songs performed by Music Engine, an orchestra group in Japan, with support of Fangamer and 8-4. On March 17, 2026, an upcoming concert tour, Undertale: The Determination Symphony, dedicated to the 25-piece orchestra of Undertale's soundtrack music curated by Toby Fox, was announced with performances scheduled to begin on August 23, 2026, and continue across North America, Europe, the United Kingdom, Asia, and Australia through 2027.

== Release ==
Undertale's first demo was released on May 23, 2013, which at the time was said to account for about 25 percent of the full game. It had an initial release timeframe of Summer 2014. The game was released on September 15, 2015, for OS X and Windows, and on July 17, 2016, for Linux. Fox expressed interest in releasing Undertale on other platforms, but Nintendo 3DS and Wii U ports were not possible due to GameMaker's lack of support. A patch was released in January 2016 which fixed bugs and included new lines of dialogue and secrets. Sony Interactive Entertainment announced during E3 2017 that Undertale would get a release for the PlayStation 4 and PlayStation Vita, and a retail version published by Fangamer, which were released on August 15, 2017. It contains exclusive unlockable achievements and new location, the Dog Shrine. A Nintendo Switch version was revealed during a March 2018 Nintendo Direct, though no release date was given at the time; Undertale's release on Switch highlighted a deal made between Nintendo and YoYo Games to allow users of GameMaker Studio 2 to directly export their games to the Switch. The Switch version was released on September 15, 2018, in Japan, and on September 18, 2018, worldwide. It contains an exclusive boss fight against Mad Mew Mew. The Xbox One version was released on March 16, 2021, and features a playable slot machine in the Dog Shrine. All console ports were developed and published by Japanese localizer 8-4 in all regions.

=== Promotion ===
Other Undertale media and merchandise have been released, including toy figurines and plush toys based on characters from the game. The game's official soundtrack was released by video game music label Materia Collective on the same day as the game. Two official Undertale cover albums have been released: the 2015 metal/electronic album Determination by RichaadEB and Amie Waters, and the 2016 jazz album Live at Grillby's by Carlos Eiene. Another jazz duet album based on Undertale's songs, Prescription for Sleep, was released in 2016 by saxophonist Norihiko Hibino and pianist Ayaki Sato.

A 2xLP vinyl edition of the Undertale soundtrack, produced by iam8bit, was also released in the same year. Two official UNDERTALE Piano Collections sheet music books and digital albums, arranged by David Peacock and performed by Augustine Mayuga Gonzales, were released in 2017 and 2018 by Materia Collective. A Mii Fighter costume based on Sans was made available for download by Nintendo for Super Smash Bros. Ultimate in September 2019 alongside a new arrangement of "Megalovania". Super Smash Bros. director Masahiro Sakurai noted that Sans was a popular request to appear in the game. Music from Undertale was also added to Taiko no Tatsujin: Drum 'n' Fun! as downloadable content.

To celebrate the game's tenth anniversary, Fangamer and Toby Fox held a two-day charity marathon livestream for Doctors Without Borders, where they played through a modified version of Undertale. It included new dialogue and visuals, several areas and boss fights. The livestream raised US$330,000; the new fights were made available as a browser game, and the new songs and art assets were made available for download.

=== Japanese localization ===
After Undertale's release, a small Japanese fan community slowly emerged, leading to an unofficial fan localization patch being released in early 2016. Since Fox had envisioned a Japanese translation as an eventual goal while working on the game, he consulted a number of different companies, eventually choosing 8-4, which had previously translated Aquaria and Shovel Knight.

To ensure a consistent voice for the game, 8-4 chose to employ only one primary translator, Keiko Fuchicho, even though it would lead to the Japanese version taking longer to be released. She was supported by a small team of editors, proofreaders, and a programmer who modified the game to work with the language's writing system. Before the translation began in early 2016, Fox provided development notes and annotated dialogue to the team, and he continued to support and advise them throughout its creation. As PC gaming is less prominent in Japan, they concurrently made the decision to release Undertale for consoles, with the porting also being handled by 8-4. After the localization's announcement, many fans were surprised by the decision to use the Japanese pronoun oira (おいら) for Sans due to its connotation with rural life, leading to the term oira shock. The localization was released for PS4 and Vita on August 16, 2017, and for PC on August 22.

== Reception ==
Reception

Aggregate scores
Aggregator	Score
Metacritic	(PC) 92/100 (PS4) 92/100 (NS) 93/100
OpenCritic	97% recommend

Review scores
Publication	Score
Destructoid	10/10
Famitsu	8/10, 9/10, 8/10, 8/10
Game Informer	9.5/10
GameSpot	9/10
Giant Bomb	5/5
IGN	10/10
PC Gamer (US)	91/100
USgamer	5/5

Undertale received "universal acclaim" from critics, according to review aggregator website Metacritic. There, it is the third-highest rated Windows game released in 2015, and among the top 50 of all time. It was temporarily the highest-rated PC game of all time on Metacritic after release. On the review aggregator OpenCritic the game received "mighty" approval, being recommended by 97% of critics. GameSpot's Tyler Hicks declared it "one of the most progressive and innovative RPGs to come in a long time", and IGN's Kallie Plagge called it "a masterfully crafted experience". The game has been included in various best-of lists, being ranked 20th in IGN's "The Top 100 Video Games of All Time" list in 2021 and 34th in Dexerto's "These are the 100 best games of all time" list in 2025. Undertale has been described as a spiritual successor of EarthBound.

Daniel Tack of Game Informer called the game's combat system "incredibly nuanced", commenting on the uniqueness of each enemy encounter. Giant Bomb's Austin Walker praised the complexity of the combat, commenting that it is "unconventional, clever, and occasionally really difficult". Ben "Yahtzee" Croshaw of The Escapist commended the game's ability to blend turn-based and live combat elements. IGN's Plagge praised the ability to avoid combat, opting for friendly conversations instead. Jesse Singal of The Boston Globe found the game's ability to make the player empathize with the monsters during combat if they opted for non-violent actions was "indicative of the broader, fundamental sweetness at the core" of Undertale. Games and Culture's Gabriel Elvery believed the general appeal of Undertale's pacifist route was the facilitation of parasocial interactions with its monsters, which was attributed to their simplicity and representation of daily human life, contrasted to the genocide route, where such interactions cannot happen, as the monsters have either fled or were killed by the player.

Essayist Sean Travers in the Journal of Popular Culture described Undertale as a critique of the violent nature of mainstream role-playing video games, where players kill enemies in exchange for experience points. She noted the game's rather punitive nature towards those who choose to play through the Genocide route and ignore warnings, citing its progressive change in tone and disturbing imagery. Travers interprets this as the player becoming the antagonist or a "postmodern psychopath", which is described as a character who commits immoral actions for the sole reason being their consequences. She believed that Undertale is innovative in such games, due to the player's "degree of choice." Kevin Veale of Convergence compared Undertale's management of accountability to that of Night in the Woods, citing the central role the player has in them, while contrasting their use of gameplay elements.

Reviewers praised the game's writing and narrative, which IGN's Plagge labeled it as "strong" and "consistently funny" and noted how it "[built] on" Undertale's themes of humanity and morality. The Escapist's Croshaw considered Undertale the best-written game of 2015, writing that it "is on the one hand hilarious... and is also, by the end, rather heartfelt". Destructoid's Ben Davis praised the game's characters and use of comedy, and compared its tone, characters, and storytelling to Cave Story (2004). PC Gamer's Richard Cobbett provided similar comments, writing that "even its weaker moments... just about work". Undertale's absurd humor attracted praise; Kill Screen considered absurdity a signature quality of Fox's humor.

The game's visuals received mixed reactions. Giant Bomb's Walker called it "simple, but communicative". IGN's Plagge wrote that the game "isn't always pretty" and "often ugly", but felt that the music and animations compensate. The Escapist's Croshaw remarked that "it wobbles between basic and functional to just plain bad". Other reviewers liked the graphics: Daniel Tack of Game Informer felt that the visuals appropriately match the characters and settings, while Richard Cobbett of PC Gamer commended the ability of the visuals to convey emotion. A reviewer in the Japanese magazine Famitsu said the character designs and the pixel art were amateur but also original. The reviewer summarized that as a whole the game was unconventional and not just weird which enhanced its exciting and unpredictable nature of the game.

=== Sales ===
By the end of 2015, according to a preliminary report by Steam Spy, Undertale was one of the best-selling games on Steam, with 530,343 copies sold. By early February 2016, the game surpassed one million sales, and by July 2018, the game had an estimated total of three and a half million players on Steam. Japanese digital PlayStation 4 and PlayStation Vita sales surpassed 100,000 copies sold by February 2018. By March 2019, Undertale was one of the ten best-selling indie games on the Switch. As of December 13, 2025, Steam Spy estimates that Undertale has sold between 5 and 10 million copies on Steam. (Note: This figure only includes sales on Steam.)

== Impact and legacy ==
=== Fandom ===
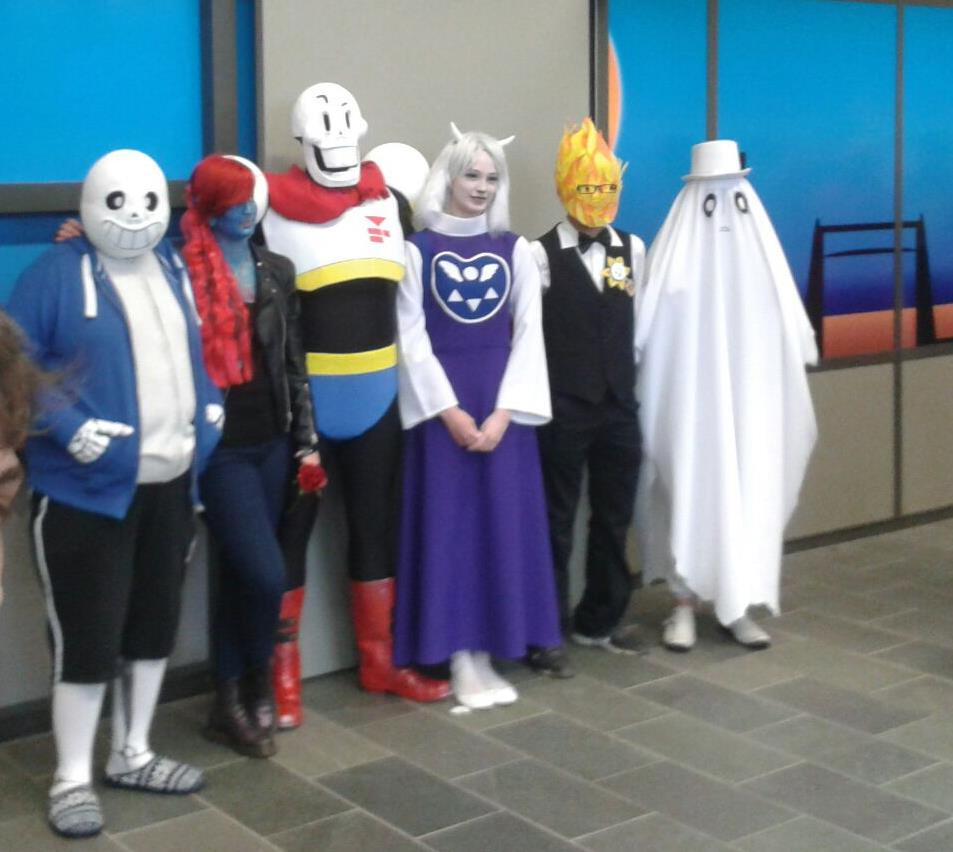
Cosplayers portraying (from left to right) Sans, Undyne, Papyrus, Toriel, Grillby, and Napstablook at Tsunacon in Rotterdam

Undertale quickly developed a cult following. About a year after release, Fox commented that he was surprised by how popular the game had become and though appreciative of the attention, he found it stressful. Fox said: "It wouldn't surprise me if I never made a game as successful again. That's fine with me though". Ana Diaz of NPR stated that Undertale "shaped the entertainment tastes of an entire generation", and that it "took on a new life through memes". Reid Young, CEO of Fangamer, said that the game became "an absolutely dominating force". The character Sans has been well received by players, being the subject of many fan works. Professional wrestler Kenny Omega has expressed his love of Undertale, dressing as Sans for the October 30, 2019, episode of All Elite Wrestling: Dynamite. Sans's addition as a Mii fighter costume in Super Smash Bros. Ultimate garnered positive feedback from fans, although The Commonwealth Times considered his addition to be a "potential problem" due to the decreasing nostalgia factor for each new character and ever-increasing size of the roster. The Undertale fandom has also been noted for the creations of various fan games that offer unique stories and gameplay mechanics based on the Undertale world. Among the most anticipated fangames was the spinoff Undertale Yellow, which, after seven years of development, was released in 2023. The spinoff was met with immense popularity by fans on multiple social media platforms.

Undertale's fanbase has also been subject to controversy, leading to it gaining a negative reputation. Part of it was due to the disagreement between fans over the correct way to play the game. After the game's release, some live streamers were harassed by fans of the game for killing in-game enemies and attempting the "genocide" route. YouTuber Markiplier refused to complete his initial play-through of the game, stating that he was "not having fun" due to fan demands.

In July 2016, during a summit about the Internet held at the Vatican, YouTube personality MatPat gifted a copy of Undertale to Pope Francis. MatPat explained his choice of gift by referencing the year 2016's status as the Extraordinary Jubilee of Mercy, and connecting this to Undertale's overarching theme of mercy. Later, in January 2022, a circus troupe performed in front of the Pope during his weekly audience at the Vatican to the tune of "Megalovania", drawing parallels with MatPat's symbolic gift of the game to Pope Francis. Christopher Cayari of the International Journal of Education & the Arts described Undertale's popularity as an example of video game music serving as a medium that could serve a great utility to music educators, citing the fandom's participatory culture.

=== Accolades ===
The game appeared on several year-end lists of the best games of 2015, receiving Game of the Month and Funniest Game on PC from Rock Paper Shotgun, Best Game Ever from GameFAQs, and Game of the Year for PC from Zero Punctuation, and IGN. It also received Best PC Game from Destructoid.

Undertale garnered awards and nominations in a variety of categories with praise for its story, narrative and for its role-playing. At IGN's Best of 2015, the game received Best Story. The Academy of Interactive Arts & Sciences nominated Undertale for Role-Playing/Massive Multiplayer Game of the Year, Outstanding Achievement in Game Direction, and the D.I.C.E. Sprite Award. Undertale was nominated for the Innovation Award, Best Debut, and Best Narrative at the Game Developers Choice Awards. In 2016, at the Independent Games Festival the game won the Audience Award, and garnered three nominations for Excellence in Audio, Excellence in Narrative, and the Seumas McNally Grand Prize. The SXSW Gaming Awards named it the Most Fulfilling Crowdfunded Game, and awarded it the Matthew Crump Cultural Innovation Award. The same year at the Steam Awards the game received a nomination for the "I'm not crying, there's just something in my eye" award. In 2019, Polygon named the game among the decade's best. In 2021, IGN listed Undertale as the 20th greatest game of all time, while in Japan, a nationwide TV Asahi poll of over 50,000 players listed Undertale as the 13th greatest game of all time.

Award	Date of ceremony	Category	Result	Ref(s).
British Academy Games Awards	April 7, 2016	Story	Nominated	
D.I.C.E. Awards	February 18, 2016	Role-Playing/Massively Multiplayer Game of the Year	Nominated	
D.I.C.E. Awards	February 18, 2016	D.I.C.E. Sprite Award	Nominated	
D.I.C.E. Awards	February 18, 2016	Outstanding Achievement in Game Direction	Nominated	
Dragon Awards	August 11, 2016	Best Science Fiction or Fantasy PC/Console Game	Nominated	
Global Game Awards	November 27, 2015	Best Indie	Runner-up	
The Game Awards	December 3, 2015	Best Independent Game	Nominated	
The Game Awards	December 3, 2015	Games for Change	Nominated	
The Game Awards	December 3, 2015	Best Role-Playing Game	Nominated	
Game Developers Choice Awards	March 16, 2016	Innovation Award	Nominated	
Game Developers Choice Awards	March 16, 2016	Best Debut	Nominated	
Game Developers Choice Awards	March 16, 2016	Best Narrative	Nominated	
Independent Games Festival Awards	March 16, 2016	Seumas McNally Grand Prize	Nominated	
Independent Games Festival Awards	March 16, 2016	Excellence in Audio	Nominated	
Independent Games Festival Awards	March 16, 2016	Excellence in Narrative	Nominated	
Independent Games Festival Awards	March 16, 2016	Audience Award	Won	
Japan Game Awards	September 23, 2018	Award for Excellence	Won	
SXSW Gaming Awards	March 19, 2016	Game of the Year	Nominated	
SXSW Gaming Awards	March 19, 2016	Excellence in Gameplay	Nominated	
SXSW Gaming Awards	March 19, 2016	Most Promising New Intellectual Property	Nominated	
SXSW Gaming Awards	March 19, 2016	Most Fulfilling Crowdfunded Game	Won	
SXSW Gaming Awards	March 19, 2016	Matthew Crump Cultural Innovation Award	Won	

== Spin-off ==
After previously teasing something Undertale-related a day earlier, Fox released the first chapter of Deltarune on October 31, 2018, for macOS and Windows for free. Deltarune is "not the world of Undertale", according to Fox, though characters and settings may bring some of Undertale's world to mind, but is "intended for people who have completed Undertale". The name Deltarune is an anagram of Undertale. Fox said Deltarune would be a larger project than Undertale, stating it took him a few years to create the game's first chapter, much longer than it took him to complete the Undertale demo. Unlike Undertale, Deltarune is marketed as having only one ending regardless of what choices the player makes in the game.

Chapter 2 of Deltarune was released for free on September 17, 2021, after Fox acquired a team to help him with further development. Chapters 1 through 4 were released as a paid package on June 4, 2025, and a day later in Japan. Chapter 5 released on June 24, 2026, simultaneously in all regions. All future chapters will be released as free updates.
