= Lena Raine =

American composer and producer (born 1984)

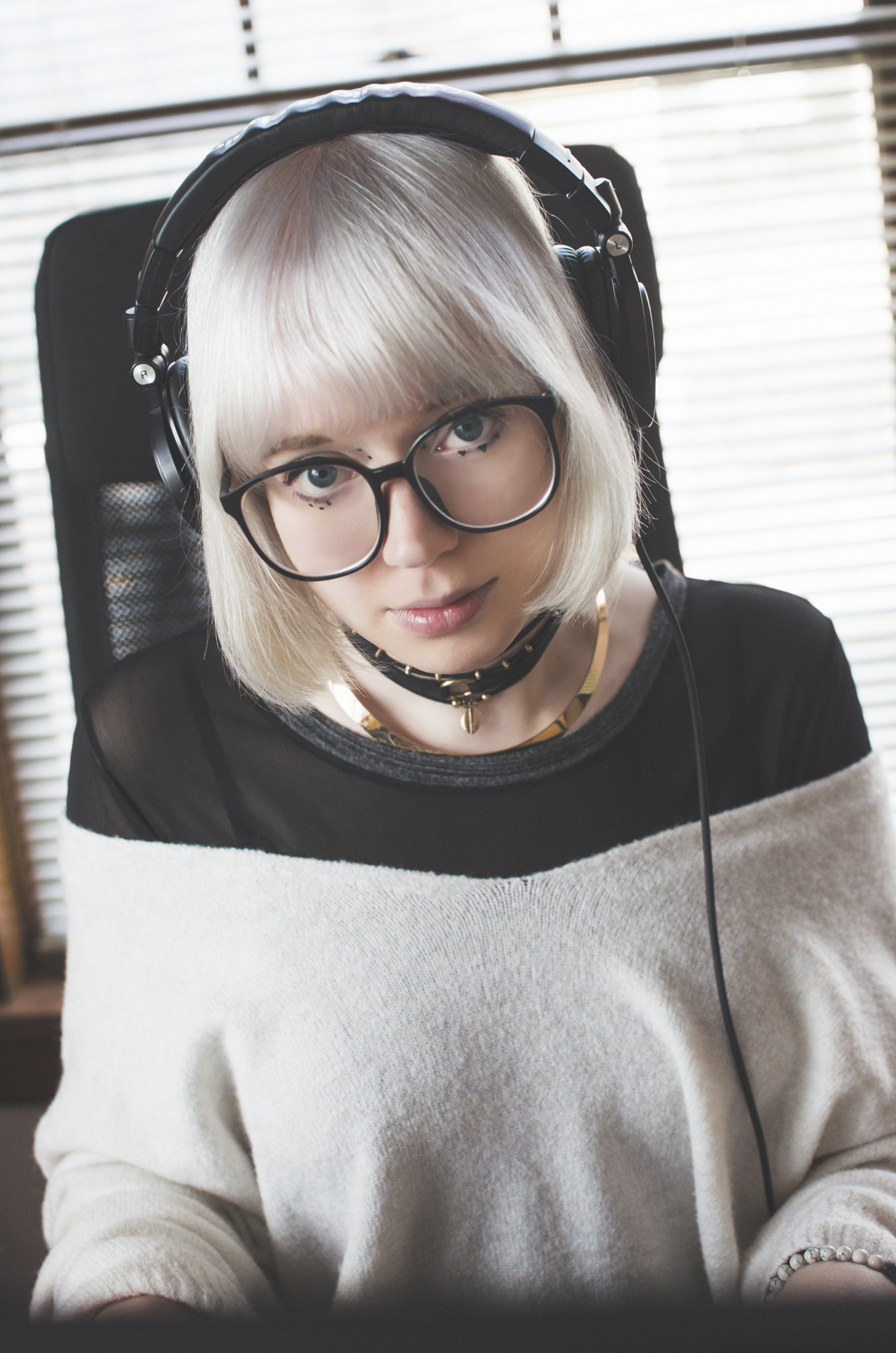
- Raine in 2018

Background information
- Also known as: Lena Chappelle; Kuraine
- Born: February 29, 1984 (age 42); Seattle, Washington, U.S.
- Genres: Soundtrack; electronic
- Occupations: Composer; producer; game designer
- Labels: Radical Dreamland; Local Action; Materia Collective; Ship To Shore PhonoCo.
- Website: lena.fyi

Lena Raine (/ˈleɪ.nə/ LAY-nə or /ˈlɛ.nə/ LEN-ə; born February 29, 1984), also known as Lena Chappelle or Kuraine, is an American composer, producer, and video game developer. Raine is best known for her work on the soundtracks of Minecraft, Celeste, and Guild Wars 2. She has composed music for various other video games, including Deltarune and Chicory: A Colorful Tale.

== Early life ==
Raine was born on February 29, 1984, in Seattle, Washington. Her father is a musician, and her mother is a dancer. She had an early exposure to music due to participation in choir at a young age. Her father was also a violinist. Through a Sonic the Hedgehog fan community she was introduced to MIDI arrangement, first recreating versions of songs she knew and then making original music. She later attended Cornish College of the Arts for a degree in music composition.

== Career ==
In her early career, Raine worked on titles such as Dead State and Hackmud, released in 2014 and 2016 respectively. Raine began working at large studios while located in Seattle, Washington, doing quality assurance and certification testing at companies such as Microsoft and Nintendo. She did this while releasing her own music before she was eventually hired at ArenaNet. She worked on Guild Wars 2 at ArenaNet for six years as a designer and soundtrack composer. At ArenaNet, she and Maclaine Diemer were in-house composers of the music for the game's 2015 expansion, Guild Wars 2: Heart of Thorns. She left ArenaNet in 2016, but has continued to occasionally compose songs for its various releases as a freelancer.

PhantomaOS - Advanced Computer System
A 2026 ambient track by Lena Raine

Raine also posted original work on Bandcamp as Kuraine. Impressed by her "fusion of ambient music, techno, and 8-bit sounds", video game developer Maddy Thorson hired Raine to compose the soundtrack for the game Celeste, released in 2018. Later that year, Raine released the text adventure ESC on itch.io. Raine was the developer and composer for ESC, with visuals created by Dataerase. In 2019, she released her debut album, Oneknowing. She would continue to do freelance and self-published work from 2019 onward, with her composition work for larger studios, such as her mastering work on Steven Universe: The Movie soundtrack, being released during the same time as her personal work on websites like Bandcamp.

Raine composed music for Minecraft, creating four new pieces of music which were included in the "Nether Update" in 2020. She first returned to Minecraft with six new tracks for the 2021 "Caves & Cliffs: Part II" update alongside fellow video game composer Kumi Tanioka. She subsequently composed another three new tracks for "The Wild Update" released in 2022, and then five new tracks for the 2024 "Tricky Trials" update.

Raine assisted with the soundtrack for the second chapter of Deltarune and first worked with Wishes Unlimited as the composer for the adventure RPG Chicory: A Colorful Tale, both released in 2021. On June 8, 2023, Wishes Unlimited announced their new game Beastieball, with Raine returning as the composer. On November 12, 2024, the game entered early access and the existing soundtrack was released on Raine's Bandcamp page, with all tracks released during early access planned to be later added to the album.

On May 28, 2024, Raine announced Anothereal, a game combining elements of shoot 'em up and role-playing video games, Raine is credited with being the primary designer of the project, with work having begun in 2021. The game is being developed by Radical Dreamland, Raine's single-person development studio.

== Personal life ==
Lena Raine is a trans woman. In 2014, she published a book titled City of Tigers, and, since 2015, has begun composing more LGBT-oriented fiction in her spare time. She has a wife.

== Awards ==
Year	Award	Category	Recipient	Result	Ref.
2018	Independent Games Festival Awards	Excellence in Audio	Celeste	Nominated	
2018	The Game Awards 2018	Best Score/Music	Celeste	Nominated	
2019			Celeste		
2019	SXSW Gaming Awards	Excellence in Musical Score	Celeste	Nominated	
2019	Game Developers Choice Awards	Best Audio	Celeste	Nominated	
2019	Game Audio Network Guild Awards	Best Music for an Indie Game	Celeste	Nominated	
2019	15th British Academy Games Awards	Music	Celeste	Nominated	
2019	ASCAP Composers' Choice Awards	2018 Video Game Score of the Year	Celeste	Won	
2022	Independent Games Festival Awards	Excellence in Audio	Chicory: A Colorful Tale	Honorable mention	
2022	New York Game Awards	Tin Pan Alley Award for Best Music in a Game	Chicory: A Colorful Tale	Nominated	

== Discography ==
=== Albums and singles ===
List of albums and singles
Year	Title	Notes
1999	Changing of the Tide	Compilation
2016	Snowflight	EP
2016	Singularity	EP
2016	Acoustic Collection	Acoustic compilation
2016	"Transference"	Single
2017	"Dawn Ouroboros"	Single
2017	Chip Collection	Chiptune compilation
2018	A Day on the Road	EP
2018	"Lullaby for Lancer"	Single
2019	"2X18"	Single
2019	Oneknowing	Debut full-length album
2020	Reknowing	Remix album of Oneknowing

=== Soundtracks ===
List of soundtrack contributions
Year	Title	Type
2013	Music Madness	Video game
2014	Dead State	Video game
2015	Guild Wars 2: Heart of Thorns	Video game
2016	Panic at Multiverse High!	Video game
2016	Upshift	Video game
2016	Hackmud	Video game
2018	Celeste	Video game
2018	Celeste – Madeline's Grab Bag	Video game
2018	ESCISM (ESC Original Soundtrack)	Video game
2019	Celeste: Farewell	Video game
2019	Steven Universe: The Movie	TV movie
2020	Spin Rhythm XD – Beyond the Heart (Broken Heart Mix)	Video game
2020	Minecraft: Nether Update	Video game
2020	Sackboy: A Big Adventure	Video game
2021	Celeste Classic 2: Lani's Trek	Video game
2021	Chicory: A Colorful Tale	Video game
2021	Deltarune: Chapter 2	Video game
2021	Minecraft: Caves & Cliffs	Video game
2021	Moonglow Bay	Video game
2022	Minecraft: The Wild Update	Video game
2022	Guild Wars 2: End of Dragons	Video game
2023	Harmony: The Fall of Reverie	Video game
2024	Celeste 64: Fragments of the Mountain	Video game
2024	Beastieball	Video game
2024	Minecraft: Tricky Trials	Video game
2025	Deltarune: Chapter 4	Video game
2025	Outerlands	Feature film
2025	Sonic Racing: CrossWorlds	Video game
2025	of the Devil Episode 2	Video game
2025	Unbeatable – Binary Reasoning	Video game
Cancelled	Earthblade	Video game
TBA	Anothereal	Video game

== Games ==
Year	Title	Role
2018	ESC	Writer, designer, programmer, composer
2018	Celeste	Writing assistance, composer
2019	Guildlings	Special thanks
2021	Deltarune: Chapter 2	Music assistance
2021	Chicory: A Colorful Tale	Composer
2023	Misericorde: Volume One	Special thanks
2025	Deltarune: Chapter 4	Live piano editing
TBA	Anothereal	Writer, designer, programmer, composer
