= Materia Music =

Materia Music Inc.
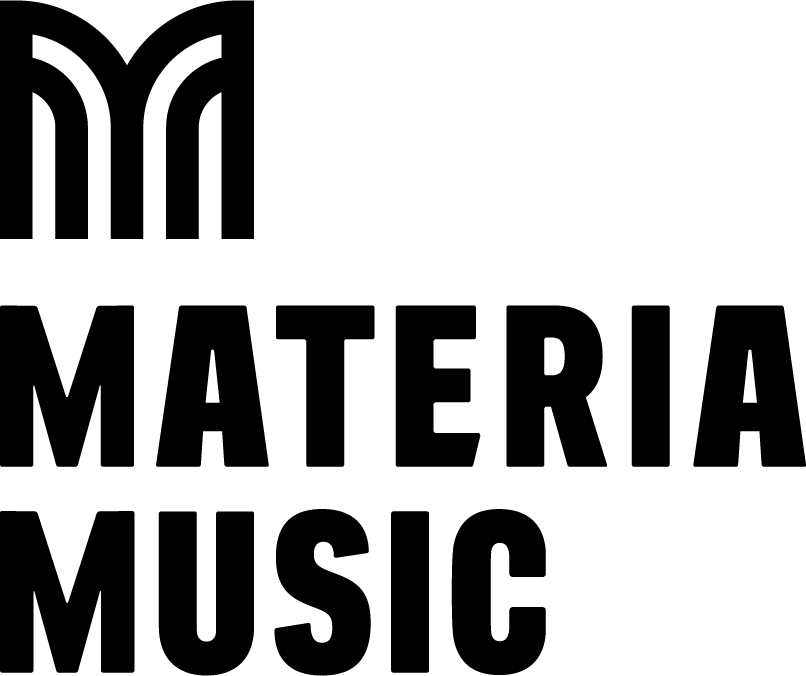
- Founded: 2015
- Founder: Sebastian Wolff
- Distributor: FUGA (digital)
- Genre: Video game music Soundtrack
- Country of origin: United States
- Location: Seattle
- Official website: materiamusic.com

Materia Music Inc. is a Seattle-based independent record label and music publisher specializing in video game music. It works with video game composers and independent video game developers to produce soundtracks, license cover and remix albums, manufacture physical vinyl and CD album copies as well as sheet music books and manage composers' and developers' copyrights. The label is divided into Materia Collective and Materia Community.

== Overview ==
=== Other labels ===
Other labels owned by Materia Music Inc. include Curaga Records, focused on jazz and lo-fi music, and Firaga Records, specializing in EDM, house music and drum and bass. Materia has also acquired other video game-related labels, such as Boss Battle Records in 2023.

== History ==
Materia Music was founded in 2015 by Sebastian Wolff, who noticed the demand for video game music publishing. While working at his previous startup Loudr, focused on the distribution of cover songs, he opined that video game music was "completely underrepresented in the music world," prompting him to start a video game-focused label.

One of the first clients of Materia Music was the creator of Undertale, Toby Fox, who was approached by the label with a request to help publishing the Undertale Soundtrack.

One of the first clients of the label became the creator of Undertale Robert F. Fox, known professionally as Toby Fox, who was approached by the label with a request to help publishing the Undertale Soundtrack. Since then, Fox has been described by Wolff as one of Materia's "favorite clients". Undertale's music was also published in a sheet music book called Undertale Piano Collections.

The label's community of artists began with the release of the five-disc MATERIA: Final Fantasy VII Remixed, a Final Fantasy VII tribute to Nobuo Uematsu's original soundtrack, featuring 87 tracks and over 200 emerging music producers. They have since released over 300 titles, including original video game soundtracks, game music covers and remixes, and community-based compilations.

In 2017, the label partnered with San Francisco-based music rights company Loudr to manage its licensing efforts, by processing license requests and usage information, securing mechanical licenses, and administering royalty payments.

In 2018, Materia released the album Children of Termina from the artist Rozen (Daniel Jimenez), a tribute to The Legend of Zelda: Majora's Mask. It received VGMO's Annual Game Music Award for Best Album - Fan Arranged. It also debuted on the Billboard Top 10 Classical chart.

Artists who have released music through Materia Collective include Toby Fox, whose 2015 role-playing video game Undertale has sold more than 1 million copies. He was featured in the 2018 Games Forbes 30 Under 30 list. The label has also released music from Malukah, including her album Reignite, a tribute to Mass Effect, in 2020. In 2017 Materia released Echoes of the First Dreamer: The Musical Prequel to Golem from Halo composer Martin O'Donnell. Other artists who have released albums on the label include composers Lena Raine, Cris Velasco, and Neal Acree.

In December 2023, Materia acquired another video game-focused label Boss Battle Records founded in 2017 by Fabian Malabello. Wolff called the acquisition a "critical step toward the future growth of the ANZ video game music industry." Wolff and Malabello have been in acquisition talks since 2019.

== Controversies ==
=== Late royalty payments ===
In January 2021, composer 2 Mello accused Materia of unpaid royalties to him and "at least three" other artists who worked on Celeste B-Sides, noting not receiving the payments since July 2019 and repeatedly contacting the label to no response. His comments were supported by Laura Intravia, Alex Parrish and Danilo Ciaffi. Mello also reported eight other accounts claiming to be signed for Materia and experiencing dissatisfaction with their payment system. Materia acknowledged the issue and stated that they are working to compensate the missed payments by mid-February of that year.

=== Undertale Yellow music copyright ===
In January 2024, the official Twitter account of the 2023 fan game Undertale Yellow reported that the remixes of Undertale music tracks caused YouTube copyright strikes, which the account stated contradicted Toby Fox's permissive fan works policy. Materia CEO Sebastian Wolff refuted the "clearly defined permission" to make derivative works of the soundtrack. This prompted a response from Fox, who confirmed the lack of explicit permission given to the Undertale Yellow team "until recently", but opined that "if well-meaning fans have made a mistake, it should be [the developer's] job to figure out how to help them make it right" and support "the love and passion" behind fan works. Fox also promised to improve the guidelines on Undertale music's usage and licensing.

== Notable artists ==
This is a list of notable artists currently or formerly signed to Materia Music in alphabetical order:

=== Current ===
- 2 Mello
- Alexander Brandon
- Andrew "Zircon" Aversa
- Chipzel
- Cris Velasco
- Grant Kirkhope
- Jason Graves
- Lena Raine
- Malukah
- Martin O'Donnell
- Michiel van den Bos
- Neal Acree
- Nightmargin
- Ryan Ike
- Stemage
- Steve Goldshein
- Toby Fox
- Travis Vengroff
- Video Game Orchestra
- Wilbert Roget II

=== Former ===
- Jeremy Soule

== Discography ==
=== Selected releases ===
Artist	Album	Details
Toby Fox	Undertale Soundtrack	Released: September 15, 2015; Label: Materia Collective; Format: Digital download, streaming, 2xLP vinyl; Charts: US Soundtrack Albums (Billboard) #5, US Independent Albums (Billboard) #21, UK Soundtrack Albums (OCC) #25, UK Independent Album Breakers (OCC) #19; Notes: Marked the soundtrack's debut release on digital storefronts, simultaneous with the game's launch; followed by Undertale Piano Collections (2017) and Undertale Piano Collections 2 (2018), also via Materia Collective
Nightmargin	OneShot (Original Game Soundtrack)	Released: May 26, 2017 (Materia Collective digital release; originally self-released December 31, 2016); Label: Materia Collective (digital); Fangamer (vinyl); Format: Digital download, streaming, 2xLP vinyl; Charts: —; Notes: Soundtrack to the indie puzzle game OneShot, composed by Nightmargin (Casey Gu); a 37-track 2xLP vinyl edition was released through Fangamer in November 2021
Eric Buchholz and the Slovak National Symphony Orchestra	Hero of Time (Music from The Legend of Zelda: Ocarina of Time)	Released: June 30, 2017; Label: Materia Collective, iam8bit; Format: Digital download, streaming, 2xLP vinyl; Charts: —; Notes: Officially licensed by Nintendo and funded via Kickstarter; recorded live by the 64-piece Slovak National Symphony Orchestra in Bratislava
Martin O'Donnell	Echoes of the First Dreamer (The Musical Prequel to Golem)	Released: July 25, 2017; Label: Materia Collective; Format: Digital download, streaming, CD, LP; Charts: —; Notes: Companion soundtrack to the video game Golem, composed by Halo composer Martin O'Donnell
Rozen	Sins of Hyrule	Released: December 1, 2017; Label: Materia Collective; Format: Digital download, streaming, LP; Charts: —; Notes: Orchestral arrangement album based on The Legend of Zelda series; Materia Collective received the VGM WAX "Record Company of the Year" award in 2018, citing this release among others
Lena Raine	Celeste (Original Soundtrack)	Released: January 25, 2018; Label: Materia Collective (digital); Ship to Shore PhonoCo. (vinyl); Format: Digital download, streaming, LP (6xLP Complete Sound Collection box set repressed by Materia Collective); Charts: —; Certifications: ASCAP Composers' Choice Award – Video Game Score of the Year, 2018; GDC Award – Best Audio, 2019; Notes: Nominated for BAFTA Games Award for Music (2019) and The Game Award for Best Score/Soundtrack (2018); described by Bandcamp Daily as "the best game soundtrack of 2018"
Rozen	Ballads of Hyrule	Released: May 1, 2018; Label: Materia Collective; Format: Digital download, streaming, LP; Charts: —; Notes: Orchestral arrangement album based on The Legend of Zelda: Breath of the Wild and the wider Zelda series
Toby Fox	Deltarune Chapter 1 (Original Game Soundtrack)	Released: November 1, 2018; Label: Materia Collective (vinyl, in collaboration with Fangamer); Format: Digital download, streaming, LP; Charts: US Independent Albums (Billboard) #41, UK Soundtrack Albums (OCC) #23; Notes: Nominated for a G.A.N.G./MAGFest People's Choice Award in 2019
Rozen	Children of Termina	Released: November 30, 2018; Label: Materia Collective; Format: Digital download, streaming, CD, LP; Charts: —; Certifications: VGMO Annual Game Music Award – Best Album (Fan Arranged), 2018; Notes: Orchestral and electronic arrangement album based on The Legend of Zelda: Majora's Mask, recorded with the Sofia Session Orchestra in Bulgaria
Malukah	Reignite	Released: February 21, 2020; Label: Materia Collective; Format: Digital download, streaming; Charts: —; Notes: Studio version of Malukah's viral 2012 Mass Effect tribute song of the same name
Toby Fox	Deltarune Chapter 2 (Original Game Soundtrack)	Released: September 17, 2021; Label: Materia Collective; Format: Digital download, streaming, LP; Charts: US Soundtrack Albums (Billboard) #11, US Heatseekers Albums (Billboard) #14, UK Soundtrack Albums (OCC) #15; Certifications: —
Toby Fox	Deltarune Chapters 3+4 (Original Game Soundtrack)	Released: June 4, 2025; Label: Materia Collective; Format: Digital download, streaming, LP; Charts: US Soundtrack Albums (Billboard) #5, US Independent Albums (Billboard) #50, UK Soundtrack Albums (OCC) #15; Certifications: —
Toby Fox and Geoffrey Day	DELTARUNE Guitar Collections, Vol. 1	Released: May 15, 2026; Label: Materia Collective; Format: Digital download, streaming, CD, LP, sheet music; Charts: —; Notes: Guitar arrangement album of tracks from Deltarune Chapters 1 and 2, arranged and performed by Geoffrey Day
Toby Fox	Deltarune Chapter 5 (Original Game Soundtrack)	Released: June 24, 2026; Label: Materia Collective; Format: Digital download, streaming, LP; Charts: TBA; Certifications: —

== See also ==
- Brave Wave Productions, a Japanese video game music label
