= A Cyber's World =

A Cyber's World may refer to:

- A CYBER'S WORLD?, song from Deltarune
- A Cyber's World, the second chapter of Deltarune
