= UTY =

UTY may refer to:

- UHF Television Yamanashi, a television station in Yamanashi Prefecture, Japan
- UTY (gene), histone demethylase UTY, enzyme that in humans is encoded by the UTY gene
- Undertale Yellow, 2023 fangame of Undertale
