= Unbeatable =

2025 video game

- Developer: D-Cell Games
- Publisher: Playstack
- Directors: Andrew Tsai; RJ Lake
- Producers: Jeffrey Chiao; Rachel Lake; Darryl Kay
- Artist: Andrew Tsai
- Writer: RJ Lake
- Composers: RJ Lake; Clara Maddux; Vasily Nikolaev (Note: Additional tracks composed by Rachel Lake, Jamie Paige, Lena Raine, and in the "Breakout Edition" expansion Memodemo, Dog_noise, SoundCirclet, and Lumena-Tan)
- Platforms: PlayStation 5; Windows; Xbox Series X/S; Nintendo Switch 2
- Release: PlayStation 5, Windows; December 9, 2025; Xbox Series X/S; December 17, 2025; Switch 2; 2026; Mobile; TBA
- Genres: Rhythm, adventure
- Mode: Single-player

Unbeatable (stylised as either UNBEATABLE or unbeatable) is a 2025 rhythm adventure game developed by D-Cell Games and published by Playstack. Set in a world in which music is outlawed because it summons monsters known as the Silence, the player controls Beat, the vocalist of a small band. They explore a linear series of areas, singing songs, fighting cops, and playing minigames. These involve rhythm-based gameplay wherein the player attacks patterns of targets as they move towards the center of the screen in time with a song. An additional arcade mode has the player select from a variety of songs to play the rhythm gameplay, including both the songs diegetically played by Beat and her band as well as remixes and other songs.

Development began in November 2017 with a concept by Andrew Tsai, the lead artist and co-director. The final core development team was seven people, with around thirty total developers including contracted programmers and artists. A Kickstarter campaign was launched in April 2021 to fund development, alongside a demo side-story to the game, Unbeatable [white label]. The music was mostly composed by Clara Maddux and Vasily Nikolaev, working together under the name Peak Divide, with vocals by Beat voice actress Rachel Lake. The musical genres are primarily pop-punk and Japanese rock, with some elements of progressive rock and electronic dance music. The game was re-announced and put up for pre-order with a demo on June 9, 2024 with Playstack as the publisher.

Unbeatable was released for Windows and PlayStation 5 on December 9, 2025 and for Xbox Series X/S on December 17, and is planned to release on Nintendo Switch 2 in the future. It received mixed reviews; the rhythm gameplay, art style, and aesthetics were widely praised, but the music had polarized responses, the plot received a more varied reaction, and criticism was given to some of the writing and bugs in the game. Two soundtrack albums for the game have been released: ALBUM., containing the music that the in-game band would have written, and Unbeatable [ost], containing other songs from the game, as well as several smaller EPs.

== Gameplay ==
Rhythm gameplay; a Silence target is about to reach Beat at the center on the bottom track, while another was just hit and a linked pair are approaching. Clef and Treble are playing behind Beat.

Unbeatable is a rhythm adventure game divided into an arcade mode and a story mode. The arcade mode has the player select a song out of a list and press buttons in time with the song. The player uses two buttons to target the top and bottom tracks as icons move towards the center of the screen, which represents attacking Silence monsters or police officers. Targets can come from the left or right of the screen for Silence and top or bottom for police. The background is a side view of the selected character, and the view changes position as targets come from different sides. Some enemy targets must be attacked multiple times, be dodged, or require the attack to be held down for a time period. Each target is scored based on how close to the center line it is when the player attacks; too many misses will fail the song. A grade is given at the end of the song for the player's overall performance. Each song has multiple difficulty levels, which increase the number and complexity of targets.

The story mode also features the rhythm game segments, interspersed throughout a series of explorable areas wherein the player controls Beat, a young woman. These segments include songs played by Beat, as well as rhythmic brawls with police officers and minigames such as bartending, using pitching machines to practice, and listening to the rhythms of nature. The explorable segments have Beat, a 2-dimensional figure drawn in an anime art style, viewed from the side as she moves through a 3-dimensional area, having conversations with other people, finding collectables, and performing activities such as putting up posters or breaking equipment. The story mode is divided into six episodes, each with its own area or linear series of areas.

== Plot ==
Scene from the story mode, featuring from left to right Beat, Quaver, Clef, and Treble

The game opens with Eve, the lead singer of the band One More Final, in an arena venue performing their last concert, before shifting to Beat, a pink-haired woman waking up under a tree. She sees a young girl, Quaver, who tells Beat to hide her guitar and guides her to the nearby city. Beat discovers that it is a police state controlled by HARM (Harmony And Resonance Management), an organization that forbids all music; playing it summons mysterious monsters called the Silence that attack indiscriminately. Quaver reveals that the now-deceased Eve was her mother, and the pair play a song in the abandoned arena from the introduction, fighting off the Silence as they do, and then fleeing from HARM.

After learning that HARM has arrested Clef and Treble—former pop stars and repeat music offenders—for the incident, Quaver and Beat decide to rescue them, and are promptly captured themselves. The four escape from prison with the help of a smuggler, Penny, and flee to a nearby seaside town. At Quaver's suggestion, the four of them form the band "UNBEATABLE", despite initial resistance from Clef and Treble, and spend the next few months playing underground shows.

Penny shows Beat an old recording studio, and the pair begin creating an album; Beat, however, is wracked by dreams, including one where she is kicked out of a band for not being good or attractive enough, becoming increasingly moody. When the studio is burned down, Penny encourages Beat to storm the HARM tower as revenge. Beat enters a restricted lab at its top, where Penny reveals she is actually HARM's lead researcher, Sforzando. She shows Beat a portal that can only look back in time to the "Zero Moment"—the first appearance of the Silence at One More Final's concert. She also claims that the Silence are holes in the universe given form by the emotions and expectations of people around them, with Beat, who she was studying, being almost entirely a Silence herself. Beat defeats Sforzando and Rest, Quaver's guardian and head of HARM, and Sforzando's experiments are exposed to the public.

A flashback shows One More Final's concert again, revealing that Eve was murdered in front of Quaver during a song. A dream sequence then shows Beatrice, a brown-haired version of Beat in a mundane world, as she drops out of college due to financial stress from her mother's terminal illness, made worse after she is fired from her job. Beat awakens under the tree again, and sees that the Silence have formed a miasma over the city. Beat tries to rescue people trapped by the Silence, interspersed with sequences showing Beat in place of Beatrice as she is kicked out of the band by her selfish bandmates, deals with her mother's illness, and drops out of college. Sforzando claims to Beat that the Silence are unstoppable, as people's emotions and beliefs have made them too strong, while Rest tells Beat that she was one of the members of One More Final, and led HARM because she loved Eve and couldn't get over her death.

Beat finds the other band members, and they decide to perform an arena concert so the city and themselves can move beyond the events of the Zero Moment. They play a version of the song Eve was singing when she was killed, as the city riots and overthrows HARM. Interspersed with it are flashbacks and dream sequences. These show Beatrice, distraught by the band's rejection, being hit by a truck; Beat empathizing with Quaver's trauma about her mother's death by showing her the cassette tape that she plays on repeat of the final voicemail Beatrice's mother ever left her; and Beat admitting that she loves herself as Beatrice and doesn't want to stay mired in her trauma. After the song finishes, the band is shown sitting under the tree with the Silence gone. Beat suddenly vanishes from the group, waking up in a hospital with pink hair. She is then shown practicing guitar in Beatrice's apartment, and Quaver is shown in her room not wearing her mother's scarf hairbow.

== Development and release ==
Unbeatable was developed by D-Cell Games, with Andrew Tsai as the lead artist and co-director, RJ Lake as the lead writer and co-director, and Jeffrey Chiao as the lead producer and rhythm game beat map designer. The final core development team was seven people, with around thirty total developers including contracted programmers and artists. Development on the game began in November 2017 with a concept by Tsai, and an early version was shown at the January 2019 MAGFest Indie Video Game Showcase, with a side-scrolling 2D art style and four-button rhythm gameplay. Later that year, the team restarted development with a different art style, game engine, and condensed storyline, and continued "pre-production" development until mid-2020, when they decided that the concept was solidified enough to enter full production. In April 2021, D-Cell released a demo side-story to the game titled Unbeatable [white label], featuring 12 songs with two-button rhythm gameplay, and launched a Kickstarter campaign for the game for US$55,000, with a planned release in 2023. The campaign was funded in 15 hours, with a total amount of over $267,000. An album of music from the demo, "Unbeatable: Demo Tapes", was released in May 2021.

D-Cell Games describes the art style of the game as intending to be reminiscent of a "bootleg 90s VHS recording of the newest anime", and were inspired by a variety of "90s and early 2000s anime", particularly FLCL (2001). The developers intended the game tonally to have a "adventurous pop-punk aesthetic", with an undercurrent of melancholy. While Beat was intended to be the audience surrogate for learning about the world, they wanted her to have a distinct personality rather than being a blank slate. Although the team were big players of rhythm games, they tried not to draw directly from other games in the genre, as they felt many rhythm games often had "clean" gameplay divorced from the rest of the game, and they wanted to create an experience that encouraged a state of flow in the player and emotional connection to the music. The number of button options was reduced during development compared to other rhythm games as D-Cell felt that too many options made the game too difficult for new players to the genre but easy for experienced players, while a limited input selection allowed for more nuanced difficulty. Giving each song five difficulty levels also allowed for more gradated difficulty levels for non-expert players, and a range of accessibility options were added to allow players to further tailor their perceived difficulty.

"No Eulogies", a song created by artist Jamie Paige for "The Jamie Paige Content Companion" DLC

The music for the game was primarily composed by Clara Maddux and Vasily Nikolaev, working together under the name Peak Divide, with vocals by Beat voice actress Rachel Lake. The musical genres are primarily pop-punk and Japanese rock, with some elements of progressive rock and electronic dance music. The music was written specifically to fit the story. Most of the music was created by RJ Lake giving an overview of a section of the game that needed a song, or with Lake composing a demo track of what was needed, and then passing the idea or song to Maddux and Nikolaev to compose the final version. Once complete, vocals by Rachel Lake were added, and then the track's beatmap was created and the track added to the game.

Unbeatable was re-announced and put up for pre-order with a demo on June 9, 2024 with Playstack as the publisher and a planned release in 2025. In August 2025 the release date was revealed as November 6, but a day before the release it was pushed back due to issues with the console versions. Unbeatable was released for Windows and PlayStation 5 on December 9, 2025, and for Xbox Series X/S on December 17. An expansion pack with eleven additional songs written in collaboration with various guest composers was released at the same time as the "Breakout Edition". A second expansion pack, "The Jamie Paige Content Companion", was released on July 27, 2026. The pack revolves around both newly composed and remixed tracks made in collaboration with the eponymous electronic musician. A release for the Nintendo Switch 2 was planned on July 27th, 2026, but has since been delayed. Physical releases of the PlayStation 5, Switch 2, and Xbox X/S versions are set to be produced in 2026 by Iam8bit.

The game's soundtrack was released in two forms: an album titled ALBUM. which contains all the vocal tracks and their acoustic versions, which diegetically would be all the music that the in-game band would have written; the other album, Unbeatable [ost], includes other vocal and acoustic tracks as well as the background music. An EP of music from the "Jamie Paige" expansion was released alongside it, an EP for the "Breakout Edition" was released in September 2026, and vinyl and CD editions of ALBUM. are planned for release from Iam8bit.

== Reception ==
Reception

Aggregate scores
Aggregator	Score
Metacritic	(PC) 71/100
OpenCritic	70% recommend

Review scores
Publication	Score
The A.V. Club	B-
Edge	4/10
IGN	6/10
Shacknews	8/10
VideoGamer.com	8/10
Siliconera	7/10
Slant	3.5/5
Game8	78/100

Unbeatable received "mixed or average" reviews, according to the review aggregator Metacritic. The rhythm gameplay was praised; Jenni Lada of Siliconera called it "fantastic", and Alice Lynch of VideoGamer.com, Elijah Gonzalez of The A.V. Club, and Leigh Price of Rock Paper Shotgun all enjoyed how it was easy to understand but scaled up to be very difficult. IGN's Gabriel Moss, however, called it "functional but shallow", and also criticized how little rhythm gameplay was present in the first chapters of the Story mode, as did Rock Paper Shotgun. The Arcade mode was especially praised by Siliconera, Rock Paper Shotgun, and Lucas White of Shacknews for the variety and challenge of songs. The rhythm minigames got a more mixed reception; while The A.V. Club enjoyed them, Siliconera felt some were not very fun. Multiple reviewers criticized a variety of bugs in the release version of the game, including conversations being cut off, voice lines not being spoken, and abrupt transitions between scenes.

The art style and aesthetics of Unbeatable were widely praised; Charlene Sarmiento of Game8 called it "visually stunning in a vibrant, cartoon-y way", while Shacknews said that "the themes and vibes are immaculate" and Siliconera called it "clever and stylish in every way". IGN and The A.V. Club also praised the unique aesthetic and strong art direction. The plot received a more varied reaction, however; while Siliconera loved the story and Rock Paper Shotgun said the climax made them cry, Aaron Riccio of Slant called it a "thin, disjointed plot". Shacknews and Game8 said that the plot had awkward pacing and delivery, and Rock Paper Shotgun and VideoGamer.com said it was uneven, especially at the first half. The A.V. Club and IGN further criticized the dialogue writing as clumsy and self-indulgent.

The music also received varied reviews. Siliconera called it "phenomenal" and Rock Paper Shotgun praised the "consistently excellent" quality and variety of the songs. The A.V. Club and Game8 also praised the music, with the former additionally liking how the soundtrack and visuals worked together, while Game8 also praised the voice acting. IGN was more mixed, however, saying that the main songs by the in-game band were great but the other tracks overwrought, and Edge disliked all of the songs. Multiple reviewers concluded that Unbeatable, despite having flaws in execution, "exudes so much heart and enthusiasm that it's hard not to fall in love."
