= Greg Lobanov =

Indie game developer

- Education: Drexel University
- Occupation: Indie game developer
- Notable work: Wandersong, Chicory: A Colorful Tale, Beastieball
- Website: wishesgames.com

Greg Lobanov is an indie game developer and former Philadelphia native based in Vancouver, British Columbia. He is best known for designing and programming video games under the studio name Wishes Unlimited, (Note: Wishes Unlimited describes itself as a studio consisting of "Greg Lobanov & friends".) and previously under the name Dumb and Fat Games. While a prolific developer his entire life, he shifted over time to developing positively-themed, non-violent games, hoping to influence culture. His "breakout" game was Wandersong (2018), a puzzle-adventure game in which the player can use singing to influence the world. He went on to develop Chicory: A Colorful Tale (2021) and Beastieball, which entered early access in 2024.

== Early life ==
Lobanov was born in Philadelphia and learned GameMaker at 13 years old, starting to develop indie games during high school. In 2008, he developed Wolf, a short Zelda-like game. This was followed by the other short indie titles Assassin Blue, Cowboykilla, Crazy Over Goo, Dubloon, and Escape from the Underworld. His first commercial game was Pollushot (2011), which earned him a year's worth of rent. He was a student at Drexel University's Westphal College of Media Arts & Design. In 2012, he released Phantasmaburbia, a retro-styled JRPG revolving around a group of teenagers who come together to fight a ghost invasion of their hometown of Owl Creek. In 2014, he became the first student in the school's history to hire himself for a required six-month internship, developing Perfection, a puzzle game that won the 2014 Philly Geek Awards. The same year, he released Coin Crypt. He graduated Drexel in 2014, and moved to Vancouver in 2015. That year, he released Super Goo Goo. Post-graduation, he took a 5,000-mile bike trip across the country called Nerds Across America alongside other game developers, which became the inspiration for Wandersong.

== Career ==
Lobanov launched a Kickstarter campaign for Wandersong in 2016, which was fully funded for USD $21,936. It released in 2018, and while it sold poorly on Steam, it was a Nintendo Switch bestseller due to its lighthearted themes. He went on to develop Chicory: A Colorful Tale (formerly known as Drawdog), which released in 2021 and won the BAFTA game award for best family game. His subsequent game, Beastieball, is a hybrid of sports and monster-taming game.

== Gameography ==
- Wolf (2008)
- Assassin Blue (2009)
- Crazy Over Goo (2009)
- Cowboykilla (2010)
- Dubloon (2010)
- Escape from the Underworld (2010)
- Pollushot (2011)
- Phantasmaburbia (2012)
- Perfection (2014)
- Coin Crypt (2014)
- Super Goo Goo (2015)
- Wandersong (2018)
- Chicory: A Colorful Tale (2021)
- Beastieball (TBA)
