= Hackmud =

2016 video game

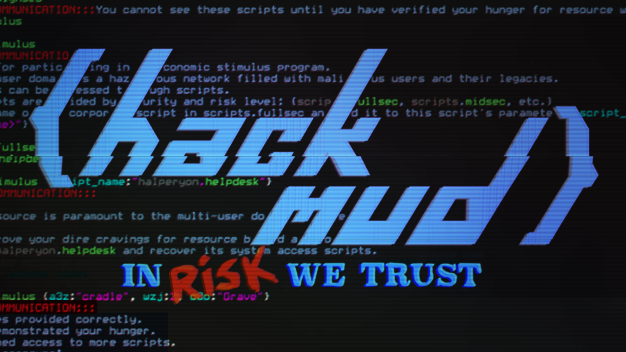
- Developer: ComCODE
- Publisher: ComCODE
- Platforms: Linux, macOS, Windows
- Release: September 22, 2016
- Genre: Simulator MUD
- Mode: Multiplayer

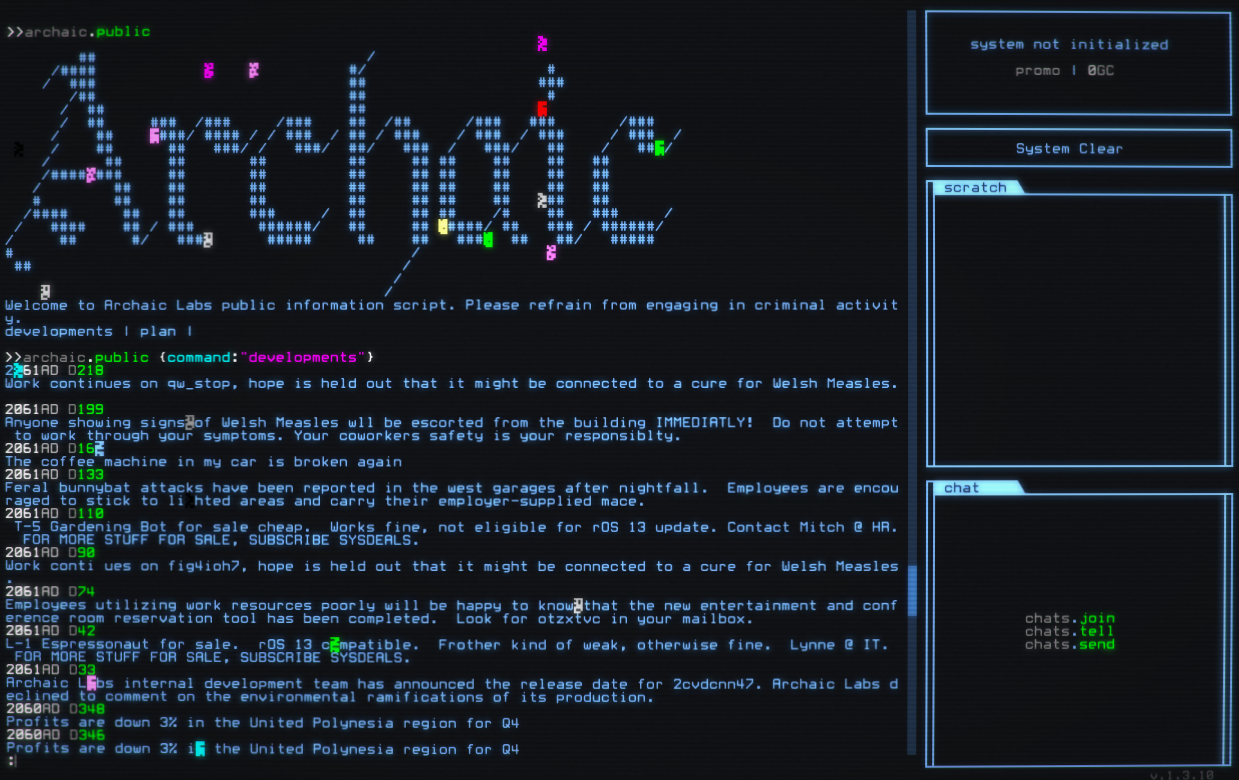
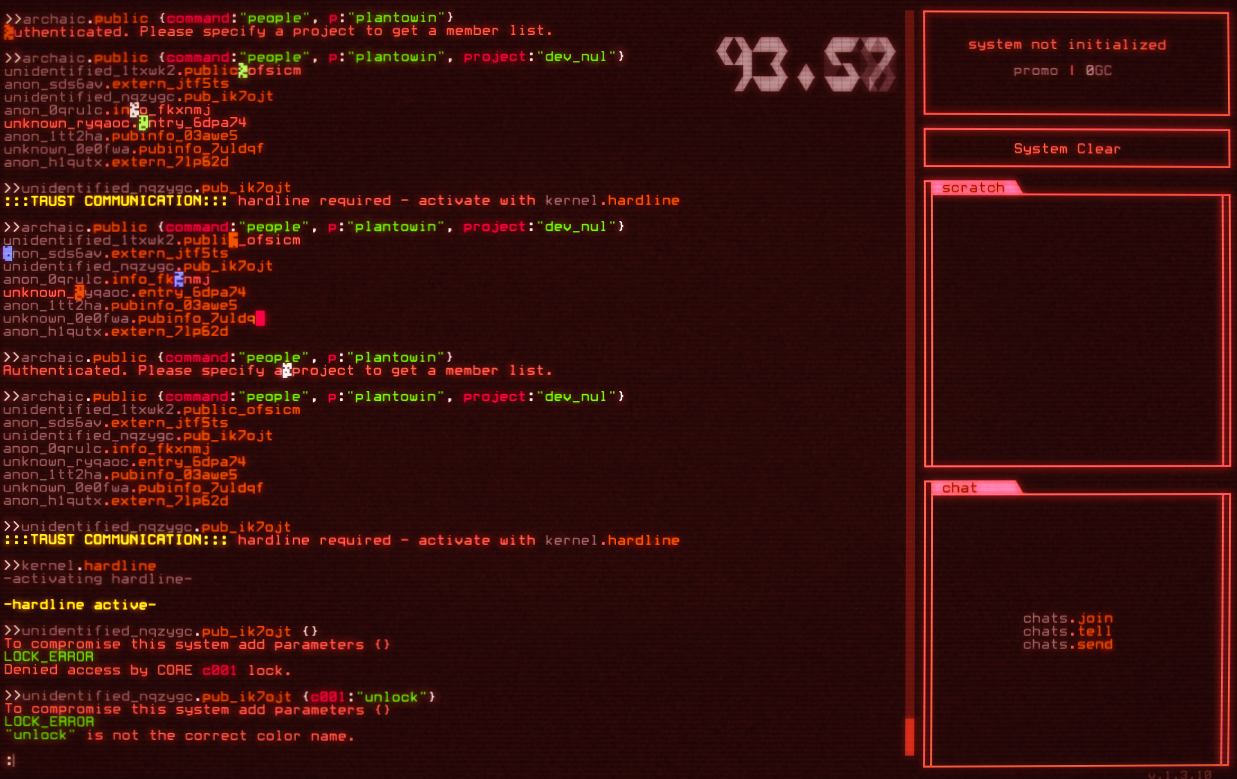
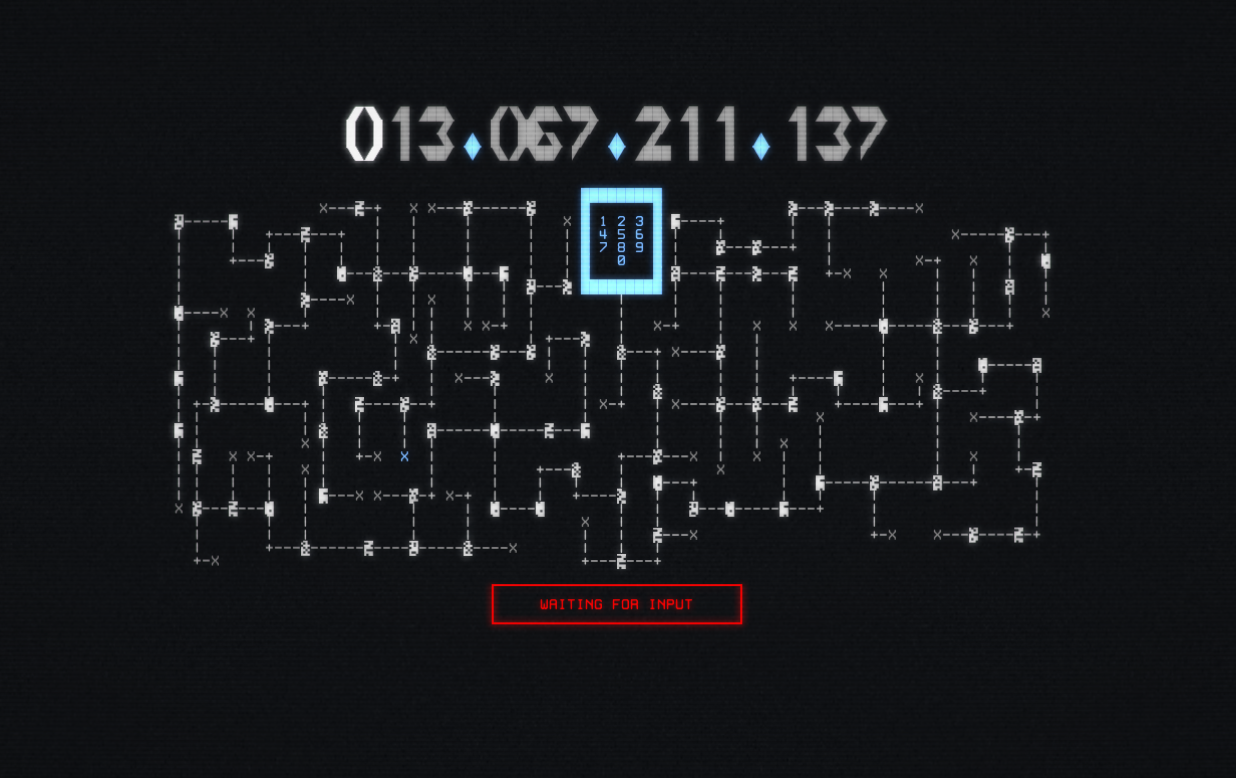
Screenshots of gameplay

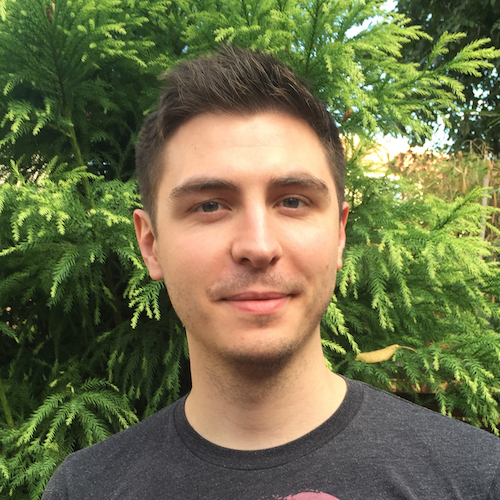
Sean Gubelman, the developer

Hackmud is a massively multiplayer online video game and/or MUD that simulates 1990s hacker subculture through text-based adventure. Players use social engineering, scripting, and cracks in a text-based terminal to influence and control other players in the simulation. Reviewers wrote that the game's "campy hacking" mimics that of films like WarGames (1983) and Jurassic Park (1993).
