= Wandersong =

2018 video game

- Developer: Greg Lobanov
- Publisher: Humble Bundle
- Composers: Greg Lobanov; Gordon McGladdery
- Engine: GameMaker Studio
- Platforms: macOS; Windows; Nintendo Switch; PlayStation 4; Xbox One
- Release: September 27, 2018: Mac, Windows, Nintendo Switch; WW: September 27, 2018; PlayStation 4; WW: January 22, 2019; Xbox One; WW: December 6, 2019
- Genres: Adventure, puzzle
- Mode: Single-player

Wandersong is a puzzle adventure video game developed by American-Canadian developer Greg Lobanov. A music-themed game, it follows The Bard, a wandering singer, as they go on a quest to gather pieces of a song that will save their world from destruction. In the game, the player uses The Bard's singing to affect the environment, solve puzzles, and defend against enemies. Wandersong was released on macOS, Microsoft Windows, and Nintendo Switch in September 2018, PlayStation 4 in January 2019, and Xbox One in December 2019.

== Gameplay ==
Wandersong is a side-scrolling puzzle and adventure game that uses music as a puzzle-solving mechanic. The player character can sing to cause events to occur in the environment around them, using a coloured "song wheel" with eight directions, each representing musical notes spanning an octave, which is controlled by the mouse on a computer setup, or the right thumbstick on a controller. Certain challenges in the game involve the player matching notes or tunes with a non-player character's song, similar to a typical rhythm game. Functions that allow the player to perform dances also exist, but do not actually serve a purpose in gameplay. The player character's goal is to gather the pieces of the "Earthsong", a composition that, when sung in perfect harmony with everyone on earth, will allow the universe to be preserved.

== Plot ==
The protagonist, a bard, meets a messenger of the goddess Eya in a dream. The messenger tells them that the world is ending, and that the Bard is not "The Hero" of prophecy. However, they may be able to save the world by learning the "Earthsong". Each of the world's seven "Overseers" knows a piece of the Earthsong, and so the Bard is tasked with learning the songs corresponding to the Overseers. Each Overseer's song allows the Bard to travel to their domain in the spirit world and ask for their piece of the Earthsong.

The Bard travels around the world with a witch named Miriam, and they make friends in each location they visit as they search for the Overseers' songs. However, the third Overseer they meet is abruptly killed by a stranger before the Bard can learn the piece of the Earthsong. Eya's messenger reveals that the stranger, Audrey Redheart, is the prophesied Hero, chosen to bring about the end of the world by killing the Overseers. The Bard is able to learn the piece of the Earthsong from the dead Overseer, having gained the ability to speak to ghosts from the first Overseer.

The Bard and Miriam continue travelling in hopes that the completed Earthsong may still be able to save the world. Miriam, who was initially cynical and distrusting of the Bard, gradually grows to value their friendship. They meet Audrey several more times as she continues her quest to kill the Overseers. The Bard tries to convince Audrey to give up on her quest, saying that the title of "Hero" is not what makes her special. Audrey rejects this and kills the last Overseer before the Bard can learn the Earthsong.

The world fades to greyscale as it begins to die. The Bard sings, and all the people they met on their journey respond in harmony around the world. Color returns to the world, and its destruction is stopped. The messenger of Eya tells the Bard that their song was not the Earthsong, but something new that harmonized with Eya's song.

== Development ==
Wandersong was developed in GameMaker Studio by Greg Lobanov, who had also built a custom level editor and audio editor to create the game. It marks Lobanov's return to story-driven games, a milestone that had been a goal of his after years of learning game design skills developing games such as Perfection and Coin Crypt. Development on the game started in October 2015, and was inspired by a cross-country bike trip Lobanov took across the United States from October 2014 to March 2015. Lobanov wanted to translate the "feel of that journey", where he had met various people and felt overwhelmed by their perceived kindness and generosity. Lobanov originally went for a more literal interpretation of the cross-country bike trip that inspired him, developing games about biking. He was ultimately dissatisfied with these early concepts, feeling that they were "missing the spirit of the trip", and opted to create a game with a "really hippy, dopey, joyful rainbow message" that resembled his experiences on the trip. Lobanov's tenure in the "Indie House" in Vancouver, British Columbia early in development had an influence on the game's direction, as Lobanov shared his ideas with, and received feedback from, fellow game developers. Wandersong was funded through a Kickstarter campaign that successfully raised US$21,936 from 989 contributors in February 2016.

The "song wheel" is used to solve puzzles in Wandersong. Directional hints, rather than solely colour-based or musical hints, allow colourblind or deaf players to solve the game's puzzles.

Lobanov invented the game's "song wheel" mechanic as a way to encourage the player to experiment with the environment, as opposed to the specificity of other music-related mechanics in games such as The Legend of Zelda: Ocarina of Time. The wheel was designed with accessibility in mind; Lobanov designed Wandersong so that the solutions to puzzles would always be hinted at through direction, rather than sound and colour alone, allowing players with color blindness or hearing loss to solve the game's puzzles. The introduction of new uses of the song wheel in each of the game's puzzle areas complements the absence of a consistently rising difficulty curve, allowing the game to also be accessible to players with a lower skill set in puzzle solving. Many puzzles in Wandersong were reworked from their initial, more complex iterations, after game testers and patrons at conventions, where the game was showcased during development, found them difficult or hard to understand.

The game's "paper cutout" art style is primarily inspired by Kirby's Epic Yarn and its "physical feeling", the simplicity of which was also easier for Lobanov to work with as the game's sole programmer and artist. Characters flip over like paper when changing direction in the game's two-dimensional art style. The game's visuals have drawn comparisons by observers to The Legend of Zelda: The Wind Waker and the Paper Mario series. Its story, which Lobanov had planned the beginning and ending of from the start of development, is mostly constructed out of spontaneous ideas Lobanov had during development based on the game's core mechanic of singing, which were made easier to implement through the custom level editor and the minimalist art style. The apocalyptic setting of Wandersong is juxtaposed with an optimistic and positive atmosphere. Lobanov felt that a completely positive atmosphere would result in a "really empty experience", and decided to add tension through "really dark, scary, big things" to the game's story and opposing it with a "carefree, happy response" from The Bard. The game's non-intimidating tone and pace was informed by animated cartoons that incorporated music, such as Over the Garden Wall and Steven Universe. The cartoons also served as a reference for the game's animations.

=== Audio ===
The game's soundtrack was created by Lobanov and Gordon McGladdery, who is the director of A Shell in the Pit, a video game sound design and music production company known for their work on indie games such as Duelyst, Parkitect, and Rogue Legacy. Lobanov, who had not been traditionally trained in music, self-taught to compose and perform music for the game. Lobanov enlisted the help of McGladdery early in development after talking with and considering various composers. Lobanov's admiration of McGladdery's musical style and the convenience of both of them being located in Vancouver had attracted him to McGladdery. Early in development, the composition of music for particular levels and scenes in the game would take place after the level or scene was completed, with changes to the level or scene also being implemented to better fit with the music composed. The game's sound design was produced in REAPER by A Shell in the Pit's Em Halberstadt, who previously worked on Night in the Woods as a sound designer. The game was a departure from Halberstadt's ambient style and Foley production for Night in the Woods and employed a more musical direction that also involved character voices. For each sound effect in Wandersong, an entire scale of variations were created in Kontakt to fit the scale of the background music that it would appear with. An eight-track extended play featuring McGladdery's music for the game entitled Wandersong: Dreams & Wonder was released on November 8, 2017, and a 7" single limited to 750 copies featuring the tracks "Sailing with the Coffee Pirates" and "Dreamscape" was released by Yetee Records on May 17, 2018.

== Release ==
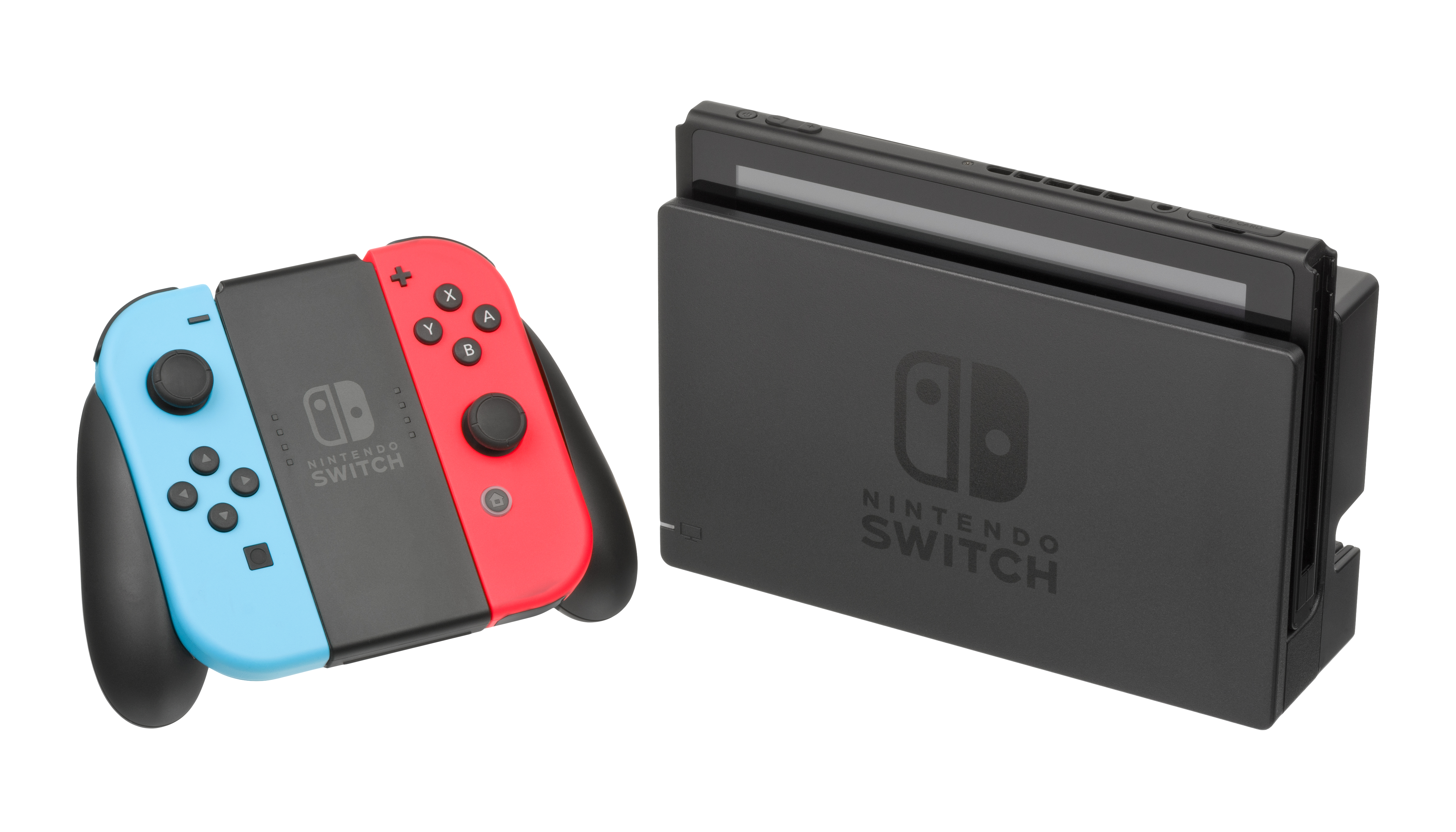
Wandersong was one of the first GameMaker Studio productions released on the Nintendo Switch.

Wandersong was showcased at GDC 2016, PAX West 2016, PAX West 2017, Day of the Devs 2017, and PAX West 2018. The game was published by Humble Bundle's publishing imprint "Presented by Humble Bundle", and released on September 27, 2018, on macOS and Microsoft Windows through the Humble Bundle Store and Steam, and on Nintendo Switch through the Nintendo eShop. It was part of the first wave of games to be released with the GameMaker Studio 2 Nintendo Switch license, with Hyper Light Drifter and Undertale also being released for the Switch in September. The game was later released on PlayStation 4 via the PlayStation Store on January 22, 2019, Microsoft Windows via the Microsoft Store as a launch title for Xbox Game Pass for PC on June 9, 2019, and Xbox One via the Microsoft Store on December 6, 2019. On Xbox One, the game was also made available through Xbox Game Pass for Console.

=== Steam controversy ===
Wandersong saw a troubled release on Steam, as the game was erroneously tagged for review under Valve's policies against games that intentionally inflated users' statistics, such as achievements and trading card progression. Trading cards and achievements for Wandersong were inaccessible to players, who could not add the game to their "favorite games" lists as a result of the policy until January 9, 2019, when Valve, the developers of Steam, contacted Lobanov via email, describing the error as a glitch in which Steam did not update the game's store page correctly. Sales of the game on Steam were not impacted by the error.

== Reception ==
Reception

Aggregate score
Aggregator	Score
Metacritic	PC: 82/100; PS4: 79/100; NS: 82/100

Review scores
Publication	Score
Destructoid	9/10
Edge	7/10
Game Informer	7/10
PC Gamer (US)	88/100

Wandersong received "generally favorable reviews" according to review aggregator Metacritic. Reviewers praised the game's story, music, visuals, and attention to detail, but found the gameplay lackluster by comparison.

Writing for Destructoid, CJ Andriessen gave the game a score of 9/10, calling it "a rollercoaster ride through the spectrum of feelings, all wrapped up in a lovingly crafted construction paper world". Giada Zavarise of Rock, Paper, Shotgun wrote that Wandersong "wants to make you smile" and noted its accessibility for players who are colorblind or deaf, but remarked that the puzzles and platforming make it "less instantly accessible than, say, [...] Night in the Woods". Phil Savage of PC Gamer praised the characters, saying that "it's the smaller character details—the people you meet along your journey—that ultimately resonate". Javy Gwaltney's review for Game Informer criticized Wandersong's platforming and rhythm segments, stating that the gameplay "isn't much fun" and lacks depth or challenge, though the characters are "charming enough to keep things engaging".

=== Accolades ===
Wandersong was named the 9th best Nintendo Switch game of 2018 and the 13th best PC game of 2018 by the magazine Paste. At the 2019 Independent Games Festival, Wandersong was nominated for Excellence in Narrative, and received honorable mentions for the Seumas McNally Grand Prize, Excellence in Visual Art, and Excellence in Audio. It was also nominated for the "Game, Original Family" award at the 2019 NAVGTR Awards, and for Most Fulfilling Community-Funded Game at the 2019 SXSW Gaming Awards. At the 2019 G.A.N.G. Awards, Wandersong was nominated for Best Interactive Score and Best Sound Design for an Indie Game.

== See also ==
- List of puzzle video games
