= Of the Devil =

2025 visual novel

- Logo, with protagonist Morgan
- Developer: nth Circle Studios
- Engine: Unity
- Platform: Windows
- Release: February 6, 2025
- Genre: Visual novel
- Mode: Single-player

Of the Devil (stylized as of the Devil) is an episodic visual novel developed by nth Circle Studios for Windows. Set in a cyberpunk city in 2086, the game follows a defense attorney named Morgan. The prologue, "Episode 0," was released in March 2024, followed by "Episode 1" in February 2025 and "Episode 2" in December 2025.

The game received praise from critics for its writing and presentation.

== Gameplay ==
The player controls the protagonist, a public defender named Morgan, through conversations with detectives, witnesses, suspects, and others involved in cases. In addition to selecting dialogue options for Morgan, the player earns "Credits," themed as casino chips, by finding critical evidence. These credits can be used to purchase aesthetic upgrades. In key conversations, themed after poker games, the player chooses whether to "raise," "stay," and/or "call a bluff." In other conversations, various items of evidence are presented as cards, and the player chooses which items are the best response to a particular line of question. If the wrong cards are chosen, or the player incorrectly calls a bluff, they lose credits. If all credits are lost, the player must restart the chapter.

== Plot ==
=== Episode 0: and he shall appear ===
Morgan, a defense attorney, is hired to defend Carlos Flatt, a man accused of murdering his girlfriend the night before.

Upon arriving at the police station, she meets homicide detectives Qasim London and Farah Reyes. They inform her that they have substantial evidence linking Flatt to being the Heartbreak Killer, a serial killer who is known to kill women with a single shot to the heart. The two detectives provide Morgan with the evidence the police have gathered.

Morgan then interviews Flatt, collecting evidence from his point of view.

When the homicide detectives come in, a debate begins. Although Flatt and London comment once or twice with information and commentary, the debate primary occurs between Morgan and Reyes. After a few rounds of debunking the provided evidence, Morgan ultimately provides her client's innocence, resulting in the case not going to trial or to the District Attorney.

After defending her client successfully, Morgan reveals that she is the Heartbreak Killer, implying that her motive was related to her employment.

"Episode 0" closes out with Morgan's conversation with ADA Emma Rockford, a clever woman that Morgan has never won a case against. Rockford provides a detailed profile of the Heartbreak Killer, suggesting that Flatt did not match his characteristics. Additionally, she also notes that the Heartbreak Killer must have killed more than the six bodies documented, as the murders were too perfect.

=== Episode 1: an idle mind ===
Morgan is drawn into the case surrounding the death of her friend David Ashur when he posthumously gifts her an advanced android named Serra. Morgan initially acts as Ashur's lawyer, arguing that he did not kill himself; after evidence comes to light that implicates Serra in Ashur's death, Morgan represents herself against the charge of owning an AI that could kill its creator.

=== Episode 2: his due ===
Morgan represents a bodyguard employed by the Ikariya family in a case where she was involved in the crime. The case is connected to two criminal organizations responding to the legalization of drugs, one operating through a pharmaceutical front company and the other facing the loss of its revenue. Serra, Rockford, and detectives Reyes and London return from previous installments.

== Development ==
of the Devil is developed by nth Circle Studios, a small indie game team led by writer and director Brian Mulholland with art director Bug. Mulholland wrote the initial script during the COVID-19 pandemic, and the team cited Ace Attorney and Danganronpa series among its influences. The game began as a Ren'Py demo in 2020 and moved to Unity with the Naninovel plugin for the full release.

=== Release ===
The game is being released episodically. A free prologue, titled "Episode 0," was released on March 1, 2024, followed by "Episode 1" on February 6, 2025 and "Episode 2" on December 23, 2025. A third episode is in development.

== Reception ==
GamesRadar+ complimented its forgiving nature, ease of presentation regarding clues, and its strong, information-heavy writing, but noted how "[they] sometimes wish all these details were also indicated on the full clue's information." Adventure Game Hotspot praised Episode 1's writing and the "strong characterization of the entire cast." Gamesline praised "Episode 0," the demo, saying that the poker system looked promising for future releases. For its "Episode 1" review, the reviewer from Gamesline said that she "genuinely didn’t have a single complaint throughout [her] seven hour-or-so playthrough," additionally noting that the prose "flows naturally." The game was listed as one of Polygon's 10 best adventure games of 2025, calling it a "cutting examination of power dynamics in modern society meant to inspire, not deflate" and said that it was stylish.
