= Undertale Yellow =

2023 Undertale fan-game

- Promotional artwork
- Developer: Team Undertale Yellow
- Director: MasterSwordRemix
- Programmers: Spasco; Mysteryracer; Deadkat
- Writers: MasterSwordRemix; Pippy V.
- Composers: MasterSwordRemix; MyNewSoundtrack; NoteBlock; Figburn; GlitchedPie; emBer; DYLZAL
- Engine: GameMaker Studio
- Platform: Windows
- Release: December 9, 2023
- Genre: Role-playing
- Mode: Single-player

Undertale Yellow is a role-playing video game released on Game Jolt for Microsoft Windows on December 9, 2023. Developed by Team Undertale Yellow as a fan-made prequel to Undertale, the game follows the last human who falls into the underground before Frisk (Undertale's protagonist), a child named Clover, who possesses the yellow soul (also known as the "Justice" soul) from Undertale, as they journey on an unfamiliar path to the surface after entering the monster-inhabited Underground. The game was positively received upon release.

== Gameplay ==
Undertale Yellow closely mimics the battle system of Undertale but makes small stylistic changes, such as the use of a shooting target, to differentiate itself from its predecessor.

Undertale Yellow is a role-playing game that employs similar gameplay mechanics to Undertale. The player controls Clover, a human child who explores the Underground, a vast subterranean landscape where they must battle monsters and solve puzzles to progress. Alongside locations and characters from its predecessor, the game introduces many original areas and monsters.

In combat, players are given the choice to defeat monsters through violence or pacifism, which can change the game's story progression. During battles, the player controls a yellow heart representing the human's soul to evade bullet hell attacks from their opponents. When attacking, the player uses a gun and must time their shots to deal more damage. Different boss fights introduce different game mechanics that change the controls or movement during battle. For example, Starlo, a boss encountered in the Wild East region, will tie the soul up in his first phase, limiting the player's movement.

== Plot ==
Undertale Yellow is set in the world of Undertale, where monsters were sealed beneath Mount Ebott with a magic spell following their defeat in a war against humans. Many years later, Asgore, the king of the monsters, has collected five of the seven human souls needed to break the barrier to the surface world. The story follows Clover, a human child with a soul embodying the trait of "justice," as they enter the Underground to investigate the disappearance of the five humans. Falling through a crack in the Ruins, they meet Flowey, a sentient flower, who teaches the player about the game's mechanics. Flowey accompanies Clover on a journey to Asgore's castle, where Clover can cross the barrier to return to the surface.

While traversing the Underground, Clover explores many new locations, including previously unseen sections of areas from Undertale. They encounter numerous monsters, such as Dalv, a recluse living in the Dark Ruins; Martlet, a member of the royal guard stationed in Snowdin Forest; Starlo, the sheriff of the Wild East; Ceroba, Starlo's childhood friend and the wife of a deceased scientist, Chujin; and Axis, a hostile robot residing in the Steamworks. Most monsters engage Clover in combat, giving them the choice to either fight and possibly kill them or show them mercy.

In the "Neutral" ending, (Note: Achieved by killing some but not all of the monsters.) Martlet offers to keep Clover safe in the Underground just before they reach Asgore's castle. However, Flowey kills her after Clover agrees. Enraged, he admits to manipulating Clover's journey to ensure they reach Asgore alive, in order to steal and absorb the human souls while Asgore is distracted. With his plan failed, he attempts to absorb Clover's soul during a nightmarish battle in his mind. However, Flowey eventually grows bored of the fight, citing Clover's refusal to surrender. Disappointed with this outcome, he decides to reset the timeline to achieve a better ending in the next run, abruptly restarting the game.

In the "Pacifist" ending, (Note: Achieved by sparing every monster.) Ceroba discloses that her daughter Kanako has "fallen down" (a fatal condition rendering her comatose). She accompanies Clover through the Steamworks as a shortcut to the royal lab to investigate Kanako's situation. The two of them are interrupted by Starlo, who questions Ceroba's motives and chases her away. It is revealed that Chujin attempted to create a soul-strengthening serum using the soul of a human that fell before Clover and that of a "boss monster," which Ceroba intended to perfect using Kanako's and Clover's souls. Martlet, Starlo, and Clover confront Ceroba, but she is able to overpower all of them. During the final battle against Ceroba, Clover learns that Kanako fell down after requesting that her mother test the serum on her. Ceroba obliged, but the reaction put Kanako in a coma. Upon being defeated, Ceroba collapses in anguish and asks Clover to finish her off.

If the player kills Ceroba, Starlo will express hatred towards Clover and leaves with Ceroba's mask. Martlet escorts Clover to the castle's throne room, and the game ends with Asgore reluctantly claiming their soul in battle. If Ceroba is spared, she expresses remorse for her actions before reconciling with the others. After reflecting on their journey, Clover decides to sacrifice their soul to aid in the freedom of monsters. During the game's credits, Dalv, Martlet, Starlo, and Ceroba float Clover's hat and gun down a raft leading to Waterfall's garbage dump. (Note: A duo of vendors from Undertale, Bratty and Catty, note that the items they sell were found in the Waterfall garbage dump, including the hat and gun.) Later, Clover's soul hears and answers a call for help from "someone." (Note: As depicted in the Photoshop Flowey boss fight during Undertale's neutral route when Frisk calls for help.)

In the "Genocide" ending, (Note: Achieved by killing every monster.) Clover kills Starlo in a duel, followed by a vengeful Ceroba. Before they reach Asgore's castle, Martlet tries to stop them by transforming into a powerful being with a serum from the royal lab, but is defeated and later killed by the serum's side effects. After the battle, Flowey accidentally reveals his desire to steal the human souls and gets shot to death by Clover. The game ends with Clover killing Asgore, freeing the human souls and escaping the barrier.

== Development and release ==
Undertale has inspired many to create amazing things and it is no different here. After playing through Undertale for the first time I was lying in my bed when the idea almost randomly popped into my head. The pieces seemed to line up perfectly so I got to work as soon as I could.

— MasterSwordRemix in 2016

Development on Undertale Yellow began in February 2016 after Toby Fox, the creator of Undertale, gave the team permission. Created with the GameMaker Studio engine, the game was conceived by writer and composer Josiah R. Smith, known online as MasterSwordRemix. Its official announcement came in April 2016, accompanied by a trailer with an unspecified release date of "soonish." Over the course of development, several animators, artists, composers, and writers joined Team Undertale Yellow, ultimately forming a team of over twenty people. Although a winter 2022 release was originally planned, the game was eventually released for free on December 9, 2023.

=== Music ===
The Undertale Yellow Soundtrack consists of 135 tracks, mostly original compositions, though it also includes several tracks based on those from Undertale, sparking a debate over the game's usage of copyrighted material. Sebastian Wolff, the CEO of Materia Collective, which licenses the music of Undertale, criticized Team Undertale Yellow's approach to publishing their game's soundtrack. In a series of public Twitter posts, Wolff decried the team's use of Undertale musical motifs and requested to see the "defined permission that Toby granted 7 years ago" that would have allowed Team Undertale Yellow to use and remix Undertale's music. Wolff additionally made the promise that if Team Undertale Yellow was able to prove him wrong, he would donate $10,000 to them. In response, Fox stated that he had not given permission until recently, but criticized Wolff's handling of the situation as "extremely unprofessional." As an apology, he donated $20,000 to Team Undertale Yellow's charity of choice, AbleGamers.

== Reception ==
Undertale Yellow was highly anticipated by YouTubers and quickly became popular among players, garnering around 350,000 downloads in its first month. Before its release, Dominic Tarason of Rock Paper Shotgun declared Undertale Yellow to be his "favourite unfinished fan-game". Will Nelson of PCGamesN recommended it to Undertale fans, noting how Toby Fox started out with a fan game of EarthBound and expressing that "seeing another group of developers bring it full circle [...] is nothing short of astounding." Aleks Franiczek of RPGFan also praised the game, stating that "in some respects, [it] even surpasses [Undertale]".
