= Beastieball =

Upcoming video game

- Developer: Wishes Unlimited
- Publisher: Klei Entertainment
- Director: Greg Lobanov
- Artist: Alexis Dean-Jones
- Composer: Lena Raine
- Engine: GameMaker
- Platforms: macOS; Windows
- Genres: Monster-taming, sports
- Modes: Single-player, multiplayer

Beastieball is a monster-taming sports video game developed by Wishes Unlimited and published by Klei Entertainment. The player controls a coach who explores the world to find "Beasties" to recruit into their Beastieball team (a variant of volleyball played by Beasties) in order to compete in a tournament. The game was made available for Windows in early access on November 12, 2024.

== Gameplay ==
The game has a variety of biomes to explore, each with unique Beasties.

Players tour the world, signing Beasties to defeat the eight ranked coaches. When playing volleyball, the player can have two Beasties on the field, with another three on the sidelines. During each turn, the player can make three moves such as passing or changing their position before the ball is hit over to the other side. Beasties take damage when hit, and that damage is dependent on the distance between them and the net. A match ends when a team is wiped or when a team scores a certain amount of points. As Beasties grow closer with each other, they gain access to new special abilities that help during matches.

== Development ==
Beastieball was announced during the 2023 Day of the Devs Summer Game Fest event by Canadian studio Wishes Unlimited, followed by a Kickstarter campaign launched soon after. The game was released in early access on November 12, 2024. As of January 2026, Beastieball is expected to be fully released in 2027.

== Reception ==
Impressions of the early access version were generally positive.
