= Music of Deltarune =

Music from the video game Deltarune

The overall cover for Deltarune's soundtrack

The music of Deltarune comprises multiple soundtrack albums created and scored by Toby Fox, featuring guest appearances by Laura Shigihara, Lena Raine, Marcy Nabors, Itoki Hana, Alex Rosetti, Camellia, insaneintherainmusic, Rakuichi and Trevor Alan Gomes. The soundtrack album for Chapter 1 was released on Bandcamp on November 1, 2018, a day after the game was launched. The soundtrack albums for Chapters 2 through 5 released on the same day as their corresponding chapters of the game, from 2021 to 2026. In collaboration with Fangamer, Fox released the first chapter's soundtrack on vinyl in July 2019, with a vinyl for the Chapter 2 soundtrack following in November 2022, and a vinyl for the Chapters 3+4 soundtrack in May 2026.

== Releases ==
=== Deltarune Chapter 1 OST ===
Deltarune Chapter 1 (Original Game Soundtrack)
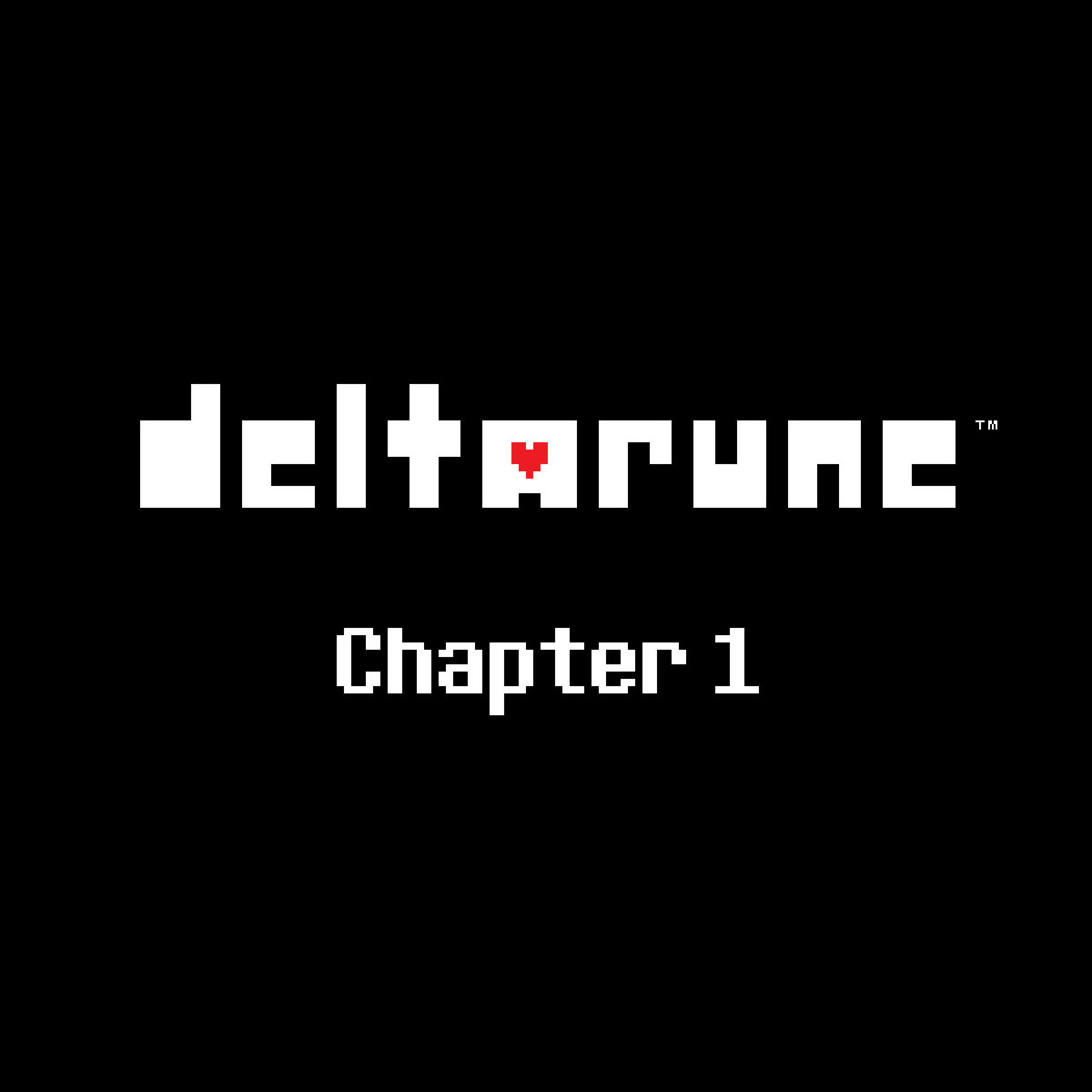

Soundtrack album by Toby Fox
- Released: November 1, 2018
- Genres: Video game music; chiptune
- Length: 40:54
- Label: Materia Collective

Toby Fox chronology
Undertale Soundtrack (2015)	Deltarune Chapter 1 (Original Game Soundtrack) (2018)	Deltarune Chapter 2 (Original Game Soundtrack) (2021)

Deltarune Chapter 1 (Original Game Soundtrack), also known as Deltarune Chapter 1 OST, comprises the music featured in the first chapter of the game.

Laura Shigihara arranged and performed one track.

All tracks are written by Toby Fox.

Chapter 1
No.	Title	Note(s)	Length
1.	"ANOTHER HIM"		0:48
2.	"Beginning"		0:57
3.	"School"		1:20
4.	"Susie"		0:27
5.	"The Door"		0:41
6.	"Cliffs"		0:35
7.	"The Chase"		0:33
8.	"The Legend"		1:51
9.	"Lancer"		0:48
10.	"Rude Buster"		1:15
11.	"Empty Town"		1:23
12.	"Weird Birds"		0:16
13.	"Field of Hopes and Dreams"	labeled in game as "The Field of Hopes and Dreams"	2:41
14.	"Fanfare (from Rose of Winter)"		0:15
15.	"Lantern"		1:08
16.	"I'm Very Bad"		0:13
17.	"Checker Dance"		1:18
18.	"Quiet Autumn"		0:49
19.	"Scarlet Forest"		2:08
20.	"Thrash Machine"		0:54
21.	"Vs. Lancer"		0:42
22.	"Basement"		0:27
23.	"Imminent Death"		0:20
24.	"Vs. Susie"		1:21
25.	"Card Castle"		1:01
26.	"Rouxls Kaard"		0:19
27.	"April 2012"		0:20
28.	"Hip Shop"		0:39
29.	"Gallery"		0:12
30.	"Chaos King"		1:46
31.	"Darkness Falls"		1:06
32.	"The Circus"		0:51
33.	"THE WORLD REVOLVING"		1:41
34.	"Friendship"		2:40
35.	"THE HOLY"		0:48
36.	"Your Power"		0:13
37.	"A Town Called Hometown"		1:53
38.	"You Can Always Come Home"		1:40
39.	"Don't Forget"	arrangement and performance by Laura Shigihara	0:51
40.	"Before the Story"		1:28
Total length:			40:54

=== Deltarune Chapter 2 OST ===
Deltarune Chapter 2 (Original Game Soundtrack)
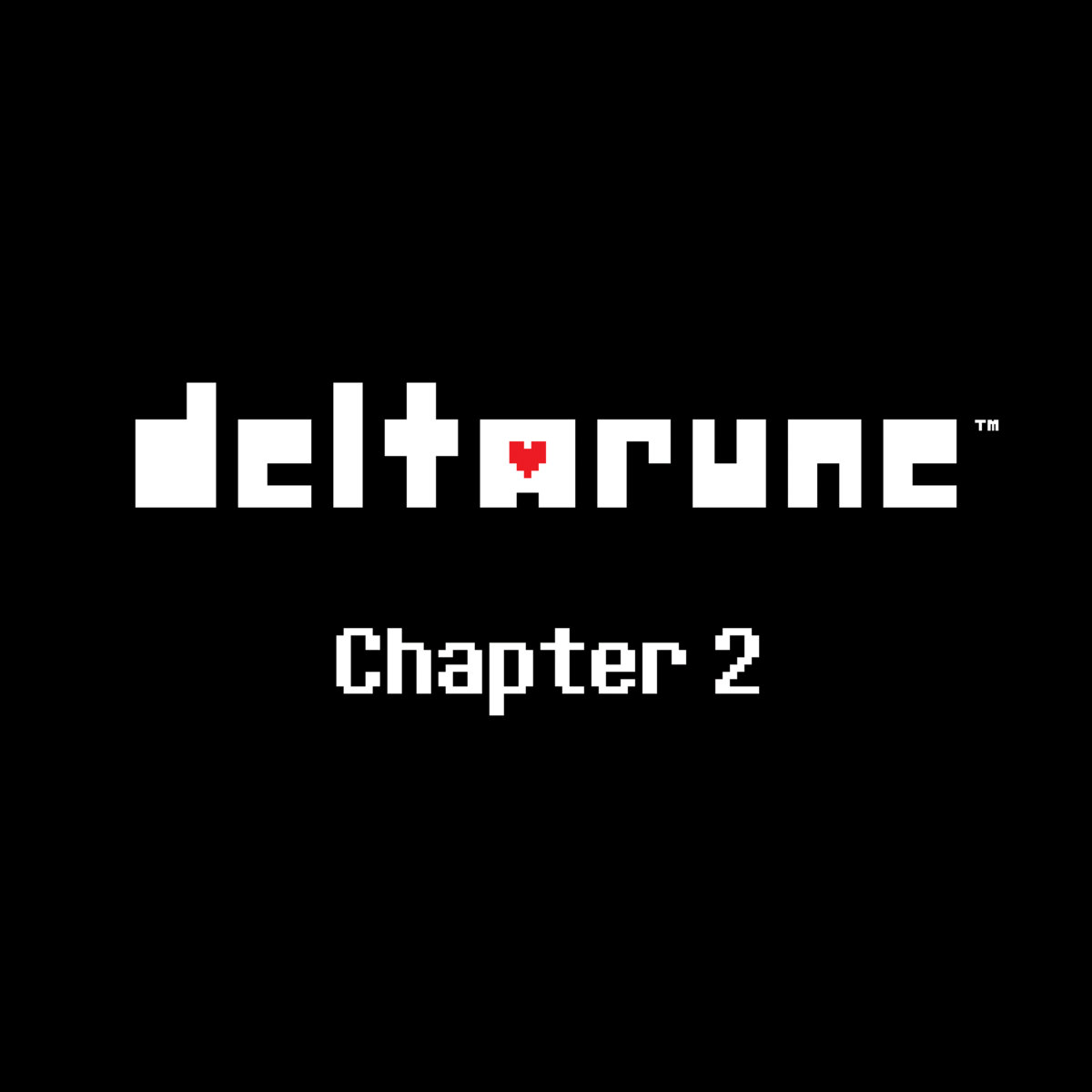

Soundtrack album by Toby Fox
- Released: September 17, 2021
- Genres: Video game music; chiptune
- Length: 49:28
- Label: Materia Collective

Toby Fox chronology
Deltarune Chapter 1 (Original Game Soundtrack) (2018)	Deltarune Chapter 2 (Original Game Soundtrack) (2021)	Deltarune Chapters 3+4 (Original Game Soundtrack) (2025)

Deltarune Chapter 2 (Original Game Soundtrack), also known as Deltarune Chapter 2 OST, comprises the music featured in the second chapter of the game.

Lena Raine and Marcy Nabors provided additional transcription and arrangement assistance. Vocals for one track were provided by Laura Shigihara. Otherwise, all tracks are written by Toby Fox.

Chapter 2
No.	Title	Note(s)	Length
1.	"Faint Glow"		1:17
2.	"Girl Next Door"		0:54
3.	"My Castle Town"		2:07
4.	"Ohhhhohohoho!"		0:09
5.	"Queen"		0:56
6.	"A CYBER'S WORLD?"		2:46
7.	"A Simple Diversion"		0:31
8.	"Almost to the Guys!"		0:17
9.	"Cool Beat"		0:17
10.	"When I Get Mad I Dance Like This"		0:10
11.	"Cyber Battle (Solo)"	arrangement and transcription by Lena Raine	1:47
12.	"When I Get Happy I Dance Like This"		0:19
13.	"Sound Studio"		1:08
14.	"Berdly"		0:46
15.	"Smart Race"		1:06
16.	"Faint Courage (Game Over)"		0:52
17.	"WELCOME TO THE CITY"		1:54
18.	"Mini Studio"		0:51
19.	"Holiday Studio"		1:08
20.	"Cool Mixtape"		0:26
21.	"HEY EVERY !"		0:18
22.	"Spamton"		0:42
23.	"NOW'S YOUR CHANCE TO BE A"		1:07
24.	"Elegant Entrance"		1:18
25.	"Bluebird of Misfortune"		0:49
26.	"Pandora Palace"		1:39
27.	"KEYGEN"		0:15
28.	"Acid Tunnel of Love"		1:30
29.	"It's Pronounced "Rules""		1:01
30.	"Lost Girl"		1:20
31.	"Ferris Wheel"		1:19
32.	"Attack of the Killer Queen"	arrangement assisted by Lena Raine, transcription by Marcy Nabors	2:00
33.	"Giga Size"		1:47
34.	"Powers Combined"		0:16
35.	"Knock You Down !!"		2:26
36.	"The Dark Truth"		1:12
37.	"Digital Roots"		0:33
38.	"Deal Gone Wrong"		0:31
39.	"BIG SHOT"		2:22
40.	"A Real Boy!"		0:15
41.	"Dialtone"		0:44
42.	"sans."	returning from Undertale	0:50
43.	"Chill Jailbreak Alarm to Study And Relax To"		0:24
44.	"You Can Always Come Home"		1:43
45.	"Until Next Time"	vocals by Laura Shigihara	1:02
46.	"Before the Story"		1:30
47.	"Berdly (Rejected Concept)"		0:20
Total length:			49:28

=== Deltarune Chapters 3+4 OST ===
Deltarune Chapters 3+4 (Original Game Soundtrack)
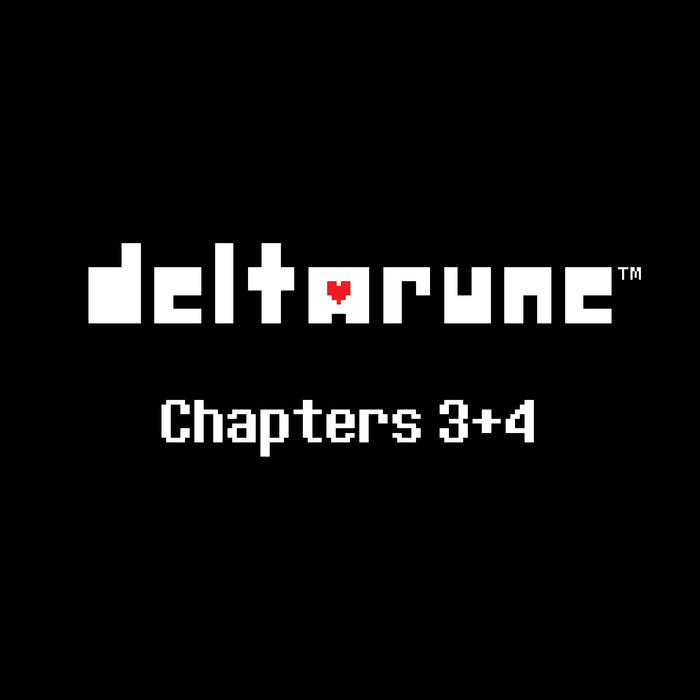

Soundtrack album by Toby Fox
- Released: June 4, 2025
- Genres: Video game music; chiptune
- Length: 1:45:25
- Label: Materia Collective

Toby Fox chronology
Deltarune Chapter 2 (Original Game Soundtrack) (2021)	Deltarune Chapters 3+4 (Original Game Soundtrack) (2025)	Deltarune Chapter 5 (Original Game Soundtrack) (2026)

"Concert for you"
The last track of the Chapter 4 disc; it is just a single misplayed piano chord.

Deltarune Chapters 3+4 (Original Game Soundtrack), also known as Deltarune Chapters 3+4 OST, comprises the music featured in the third and fourth chapters of the game.

Alex Rosetti, Lena Raine, and Itoki Hana are credited as contributors for some tracks. Otherwise, all tracks are written by Toby Fox.

Chapter 3 (Disc 1)
No.	Title	Note(s)	Length
1.	"Flashback (Excerpt)"		0:32
2.	"Feature Presentation"		0:42
3.	"And Now For Today's Sponsors...!"		0:31
4.	"MIKE, the BOARD, please!"		0:32
5.	"Sandy Board"		1:18
6.	"Adventure Board"		0:59
7.	"Query?"		0:24
8.	"Quiz!"		1:16
9.	"Dig! Dig! To The Center of the Earth!"		0:07
10.	"Pushing Buddies"		0:19
11.	"Ruder Buster"		1:46
12.	"Physical Challenge"		1:47
13.	"Board Clear!"		0:34
14.	"Welcome to the Green Room"		1:30
15.	"Vapor Buster"		2:00
16.	"Paradise, Paradise"		2:30
17.	"Raft Ride"		1:09
18.	"South of the Border!!"		0:12
19.	"Sound Check"		0:25
20.	"Raise Up Your Bat"		2:13
21.	"King of Rolypoly"		0:48
22.	"Glowing Snow"		2:22
23.	"Big City Board"		1:22
24.	"Doom Board"		0:52
25.	"Metaphysical Challenge"		0:52
26.	"TV World"		2:09
27.	"It's TV Time!"		2:45
28.	"Hall of Fame"		0:30
29.	"Breath"		0:14
30.	"Black Knife"		1:57
31.	"Crickets"		0:36
32.	"Dump"		0:40
33.	"Sword"		2:12
34.	"Northernlight"		0:22
35.	"Glaceir"	[sic]	1:07
36.	"Bit Roots"		1:17
37.	"Eram"		0:15
38.	"Burning Eyes"		1:05
Total length:			42:11

Chapter 4 (Disc 2)
No.	Title	Note(s)	Length
39.	"Old wooden rafters"		1:38
40.	"Hymn"		0:33
41.	"Another day in hometown"		2:19
42.	"Friends"		1:25
43.	"Castle Funk"		2:56
44.	"Knock You Down!! (Rhythm Ver.)"		2:17
45.	"Gingerbread House"		1:27
46.	"The distance between two"		0:42
47.	"C"		0:41
48.	"Atrium"		1:00
49.	"Dark Sanctuary"	vocals by Itoki Hana	1:46
50.	"From Now On (Battle 2)"		1:48
51.	"Gyaa Ha Ha!"	arranged by Alex Rosetti	1:15
52.	"Fireplace"		2:37
53.	"A Dark Zone"		2:18
54.	"Mysterious Ringing"		0:22
55.	"Ever Higher"		1:27
56.	"Wise words"		0:42
57.	"Piano that may not be played that well"	audio editing by Lena Raine	0:42
58.	"Hammer of Justice"		2:13
59.	"12am"		0:34
60.	"The Second Sanctuary"		2:46
61.	"Ripple"		2:31
62.	"13am"		1:26
63.	"The Third Sanctuary"		4:07
64.	"Dark Place"		0:58
65.	"Heavy Footsteps"		0:38
66.	"Crumbling Tower"		2:49
67.	"Spawn"		1:11
68.	"Guardian"		3:46
69.	"Need a hand!?"		0:46
70.	"The place where it rained"		2:52
71.	"The Ol' Jitterbug"		0:22
72.	"Neverending Night"	vocals by Itoki Hana	1:39
73.	"The LEGEND...?"		0:26
74.	"With Hope Crossed On Our Hearts"		1:39
75.	"Volume Adjustment"		0:36
76.	"Catswing"		1:58
77.	"Air Waves"		2:00
78.	"Concert for you"		0:02
Total length:			1:03:14

=== Deltarune Chapter 5 OST ===
Deltarune Chapter 5 (Original Game Soundtrack)
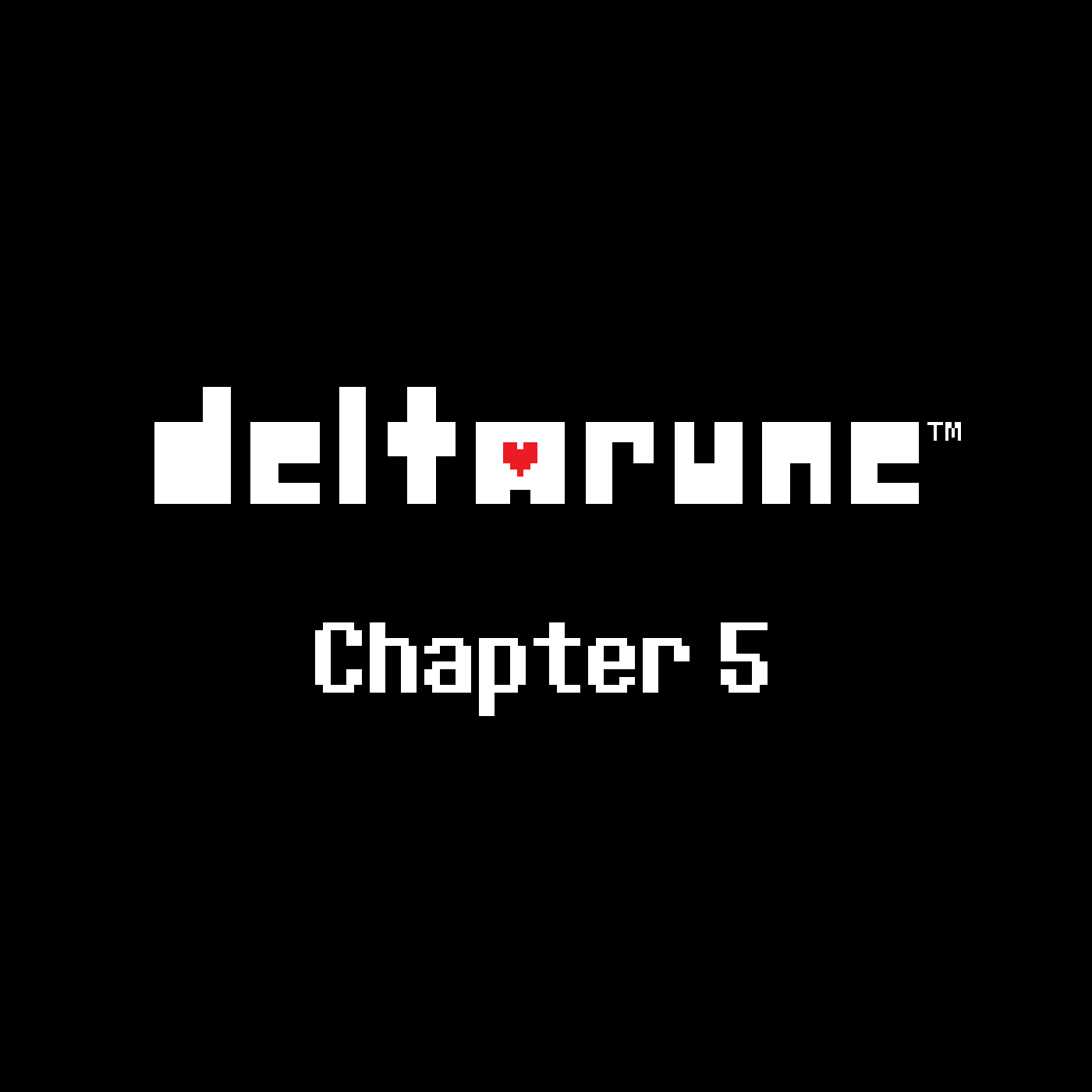

Soundtrack album by Toby Fox
- Released: June 24, 2026
- Genres: Video game music; chiptune
- Length: 1:00:42
- Label: Materia Collective

Toby Fox chronology
Deltarune Chapters 3+4 (Original Game Soundtrack) (2025)	Deltarune Chapter 5 (Original Game Soundtrack) (2026)

Deltarune Chapter 5 (Original Game Soundtrack) comprises the music featured in the fifth chapter of the game.

In a December 2025 newsletter, Toby Fox released "Shop 3", a song that "most of the remaining shopkeepers in the game [will] use". He noted that it is the only Chapter 5 song "that doesn't spoil something."

Itoki Hana, insaneintherainmusic, Rakuichi, Camellia and Trevor Alan Gomes are credited as contributors for some tracks. Otherwise, all tracks are written by Toby Fox. One song, "Cutie Mew Mew Magic", features English and Japanese vocals performed with the Hatsune Miku voicebank.

Chapter 5
No.	Title	Note(s)	Length
1.	"Chapter 5 Logo"	vocals by Itoki Hana	0:08
2.	"Inappropriate Recycling"		1:36
3.	"Pirate Dojo"		0:52
4.	"4rd Sanctuary"	[sic]	1:19
5.	"Festival"		2:00
6.	"Catfession...?"		0:42
7.	"Bratfession...?"		0:42
8.	"I guess I'm in love"	arrangement by Itoki Hana	2:57
9.	"Weirder Birds"		0:37
10.	"Your Dad's Best Friend"		0:28
11.	"Garden of Hopes and Dreams"	arrangement and performance by insaneintherainmusic	3:23
12.	"Rakuichi Buster"	arrangement by Rakuichi	1:49
13.	"The Diner Song of Best Friends"		1:25
14.	"Ride the Board"		0:10
15.	"Quiet Glade"		3:17
16.	"Who might you be?"		1:04
17.	"Petal Dance"		1:32
18.	"Flying Feather"		0:27
19.	"Sunset of Seven Suns"		1:36
20.	"Shop 3"		1:15
21.	"Violet Tactics"		1:05
22.	"Flower King"		0:40
23.	"Flower Foyer"		0:55
24.	"Flower Castle"		4:30
25.	"Thousand Cafe Zukan"		1:29
26.	"I'm Telling!"		0:40
27.	"Stop, Criminell!"	[sic]	0:45
28.	"Loving Steps"		2:13
29.	"Onsen"	previously listed as "Running Water 3"	1:43
30.	"Beautiful Bathtime"		0:21
31.	"Pink"		1:13
32.	"Cutie Mew Mew Magic"	arrangement by Camellia	3:04
33.	"Running Sky"		2:22
34.	"Flower Man"	arrangement by Camellia	3:12
35.	"That Day"		1:30
36.	"Dreamwatchers"		1:17
37.	"Weak Flowers"		1:42
38.	"Walking Home"		2:16
39.	"Field of Hopes and Dreams (Credits Version)"	an excerpt of "Field of Hopes and Dreams" from DELTARUNE Piano Collections, Vol. 1, featuring Trevor Alan Gomes	1:39
40.	"Goodnight, Sweet Prince"		0:31
Total length:			1:00:42

== Reception ==
The game's soundtrack was widely praised by critics, who highlighted its variety and quality. Brendan Graeber of IGN called the soundtrack "truly unforgettable," feeling that it benefited from Fox being both the lead developer and composer. TechRadar writer Vic Hood described it as "stunning chiptune," and GamesRadar+'s Alan Wen stated that it became "permanently wedged in [his] head." Mitch Vogel of Nintendo Life called Fox a "master of creating atmosphere" and the soundtrack "both deep and varied."

Writing for The New York Times, Harold Goldberg praised the "remarkably diverse" soundtrack, noting its length of over 150 songs. Graeber described the music as spanning "all sorts of genres," and William van Dijk of Vandal stated that Fox brought a "unique spirit" to each track. For The Games Machine, Alessandro Alosi praised the fusion of sound styles, stating that the tracks are "capable of alternating melancholy, irony, and pure tension."

=== Charts ===
==== Deltarune Chapter 1 OST ====
Chart (2018)	Peak position
US Independent Albums (Billboard)	41
UK Soundtrack Albums (OCC)	23

==== Deltarune Chapter 2 OST ====
Chart (2021)	Peak position
US Top Current Albums Sales (Billboard)	99
US Heatseekers Albums (Billboard)	14
US Soundtrack Albums (Billboard)	11
UK Soundtrack Albums (OCC)	15

==== Deltarune Chapters 3+4 OST ====
Chart (2025)	Peak position
US Soundtrack Albums (Billboard)	5
US Independent Albums (Billboard)	50
UK Soundtrack Albums (OCC)	15

==== Deltarune Chapter 5 OST ====
Chart (2026)	Peak position
Irish Independent Albums (IRMA)	17
UK Album Downloads (Official Charts)	8
UK Soundtrack Albums (Official Charts)	5
US Independent Albums (Billboard)	32
US Soundtrack Albums (Billboard)	3
US Top Dance Albums (Billboard)	5

==== Charted songs ====
Title	Year	Peak position	Album
Title	Year	US Dance	Album
"Flower Man" (featuring Camellia)	2026	13	Deltarune Chapter 5 OST
"Cutie Mew Mew Magic" (featuring Camellia)	2026	18	Deltarune Chapter 5 OST
