= EarthBound 64 =

Canceled video game

- The game's logo revealed at Space World 1999 with the subheading "Fall of the Pig King"
- Developers: Nintendo; HAL Laboratory; Creatures Inc.
- Publisher: Nintendo
- Producers: Shigeru Miyamoto; Satoru Iwata
- Designers: Shigesato Itoi; Akihiko Miura
- Artist: Benimaru Itoh
- Composer: Shogo Sakai
- Platform: Nintendo 64
- Release: Canceled
- Genre: Role-playing game
- Mode: Single-player

EarthBound 64, known in Japan as Mother 3: Fall of the Pig King, (Note: Japanese: MOTHER3豚王の最期, Hepburn: Mazā Surī: Buta-ō no Saigo) is a canceled role-playing video game that was under development by Nintendo and HAL Laboratory for the Nintendo 64. It was intended to be the third game in the Mother series following EarthBound (1994), with series creator Shigesato Itoi working as designer. The game was slated to feature ten playable characters across twelve chapters, including cowboy Flint and his sons Lucas and Claus, with the character Porky Minch – who was previously featured in EarthBound – serving as the game's main antagonist.

Initially intended for the Super Famicom, development was transferred to the 64DD peripheral, before being moved to a standard Nintendo 64 Game Pak in 1999. The game suffered numerous delays due to the 64DD's failure and the developers' inexperience with 3D technology, leading to its cancellation in August 2000. The project was later revived for the Game Boy Advance, though with many alterations from the N64 version of the game, and eventually released in 2006 as Mother 3, with assistance from developer Brownie Brown.

Though EarthBound 64 was considered to be lagging behind other games in terms of popularity in the mid 1990s, it steadily gained traction and was included in many lists of anticipated games. Scenes from the game's demo were received positively, with many critics believing the game could make a big impact once it was released. Its cancellation drew criticism from Mother fans due to the long wait time prior to its cancellation, notably from its American fanbase, who made many petitions in an attempt to get the game to release.

== Gameplay ==
EarthBound 64 was a role-playing game. The game would have had a large overworld for players to explore, with battles with enemies triggered by interacting with them in the overworld. After triggering a battle with an enemy, players would have had a brief opportunity to avoid entering combat, even against stronger opponents.

In combat, EarthBound 64 would have used a fighting style similar to its predecessors. Battle would be done on a black swirling background with "psychedelic imagery" from a first-person perspective, similarly to EarthBound. A circular battle menu would allow players to use a variety of options: "Check", "Items", "Stand", "Fight", "Strength", and "Magic". If Magic was used too much by a given character, they would be unable to select actions in combat for a short time. The battle music was highly important to combat, as hitting attacks on time with the battle music (Apparently done by strumming a 3D guitar) would make them stronger. A wide variety of attacks could be performed, with many being based on the player's timing. Different enemies were planned to become stronger as the game progressed, and developers stated that the game would require 40 to 60 hours for experienced gamers to finish it.

== Development ==
=== Conception and eventual cancellation ===
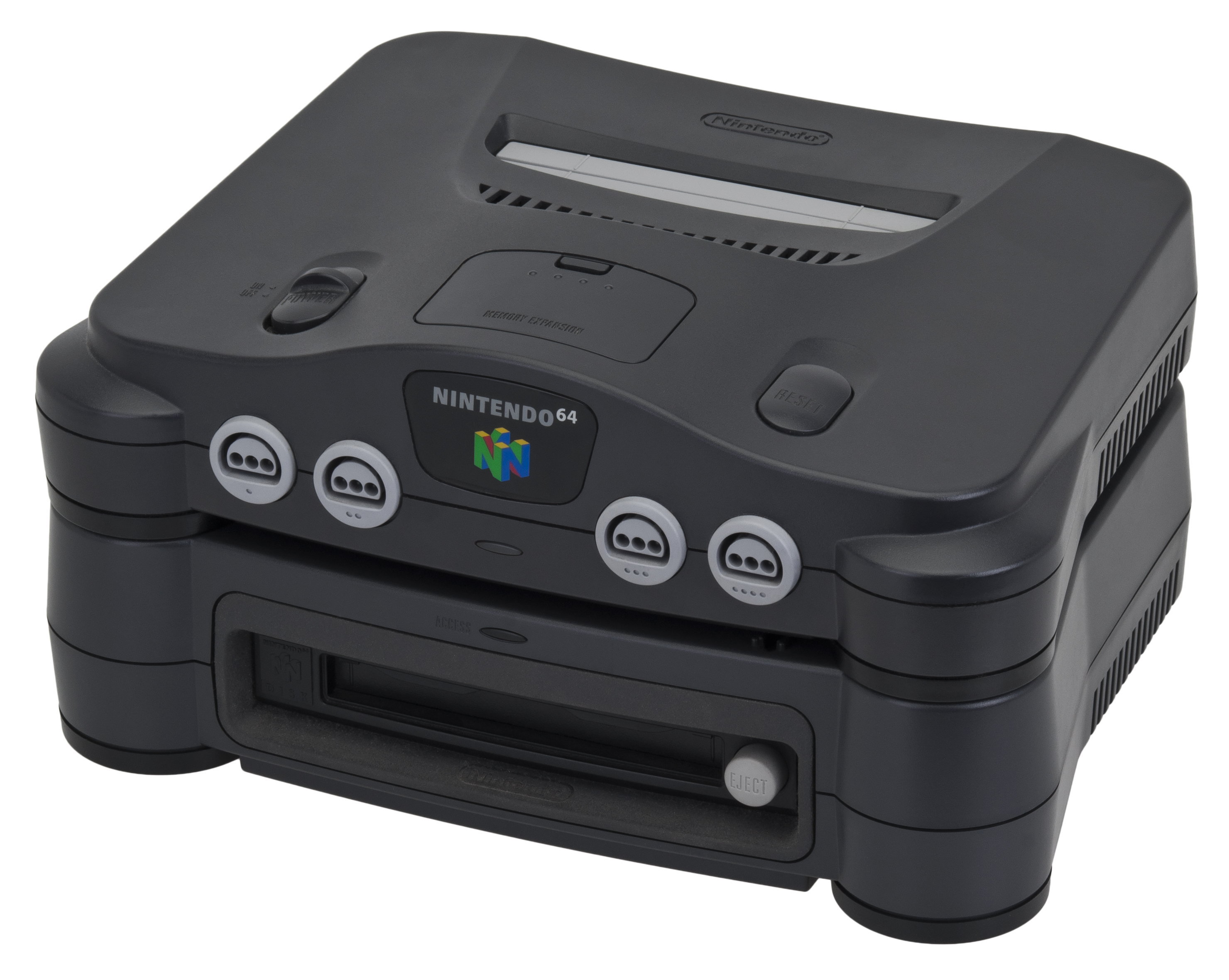
The game was designed for the 64DD peripheral, shown here as docked beneath the Nintendo 64.

EarthBound 64, known as Mother 3 in Japan, was initially conceived of for the Super Famicom (Super NES) that began development in 1994. Shigeru Miyamoto, head of Nintendo Entertainment Analysis & Development and the final game's producer, stated that it was "a commercial decision", since Mother 2 (EarthBound outside Japan) had sold well. By this point, Mother series creator Shigesato Itoi had worked on the series' earlier games and Itoi Shigesato no Bass Tsuri No. 1 and was experienced at pitching video games, so Miyamoto provided a team willingly. The Mother 2 development team carried over to the new game's development, though several people left and the team grew in size. They forwent the usual prototyping phase and went straight into development expecting to create something unprecedented. Itoi said he wanted to make the game like a Hollywood film. In September 1994, he predicted that Mother 3's development would end around 1996 with a release on Nintendo's then-upcoming console, the Nintendo 64. According to Reid Young, founder of Starmen.net and Fangamer, the game was intended for a brief period of time to have pre-rendered 3D sprites similar to Donkey Kong Country on the Super NES. The team was inspired by Super Mario 64 and decided that they too could creatively flourish by making a 3D open world. Their early technical specifications exceeded the capabilities and memory limits of the platform. The limited storage on the N64's cartridges meant that pre-rendered cutscenes planned for the game, akin to 1997 game Final Fantasy VII's, were unable to be produced. About halfway through development, the team attempted to scale back its large scope and changed its target from cartridge to the 64DD peripheral, which granted significantly more storage and levels of interactivity not present on the N64. Miyamoto stated in 1997 that the 64DD would allow for the game to potentially have multiple branching story paths, with IGN repeating this statement in 1998, though Iwata would state later in 1997 that the story would be the same regardless of player choice, with the choices of the player instead allowing the path along the story to be different. Other planned features the 64DD would allow for were the ability to use a real time clock and expanded interactions and missions, with the in-game clock in particular being planned to allow for the incorporation of concepts such as seasons and plant growth in the game. At E3 in June 1997, Miyamoto speculated that the game would be one of the four games for the then-expected 1998 launch of the Japan-only peripheral.

The EarthBound fan community anticipated a sequel, and a North American release of Mother 3 was announced as EarthBound 64, decided upon as they felt the Mother name would be confusing for English players and to allow for an easy title for new players to jump on to. Nintendo displayed a playable version of the game at its Space World 1999 trade show, composed of various sections from throughout the game, where IGN described the development's progress as "very far along" and half complete. Having followed a period of media silence, the announcement there of its conversion from a 64DD game to a regular N64 game with an added 64DD expansion, dubbed Mother 3.5, was considered by IGN as a sign of further delay or cancellation of the 64DD altogether. In March 2000, the game was announced in the magazine 64Dream to have been delayed to a summer release. The company struggled to find a firm release date, and was expected to release in Japan before a North American version would be considered. Additionally, at the time, the 64DD was only released in Japan, and was expected to sell poorly. Nintendo did not show the game at the 2000 Electronic Entertainment Expo, though IGN expected to see a finished version of the game at Space World 2000. Mother producer Satoru Iwata canceled the game altogether prior to Space World 2000, as announced by Itoi on August 20. Itoi's team ran into trouble while developing this game due to their inexperience with 3D game development with the Nintendo 64. The game's scope and ambition compared to other N64 titles was stated to be a major reason behind its cancellation, as was the reliance on the 64DD, which was considered a failure due to poor sales figures.

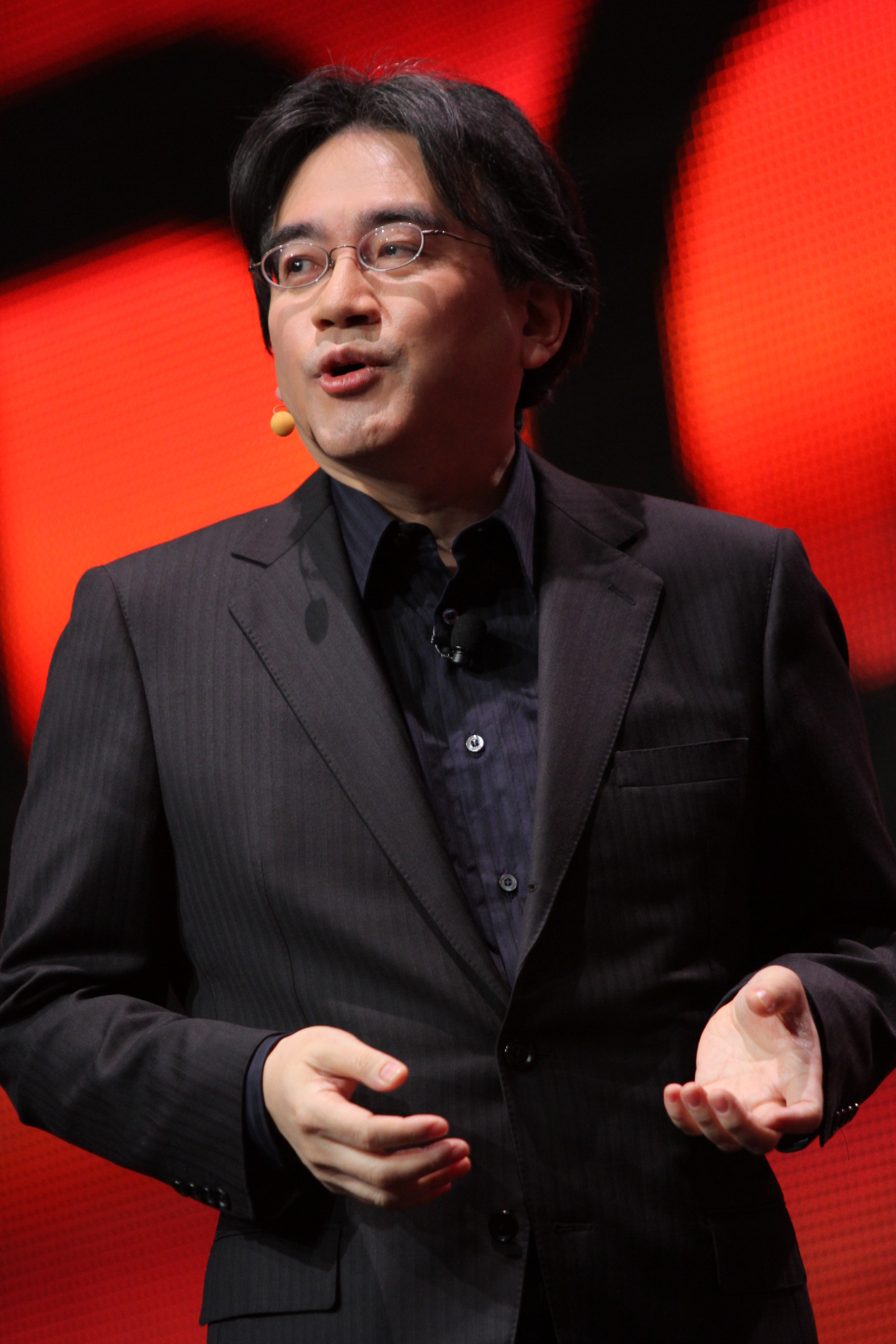
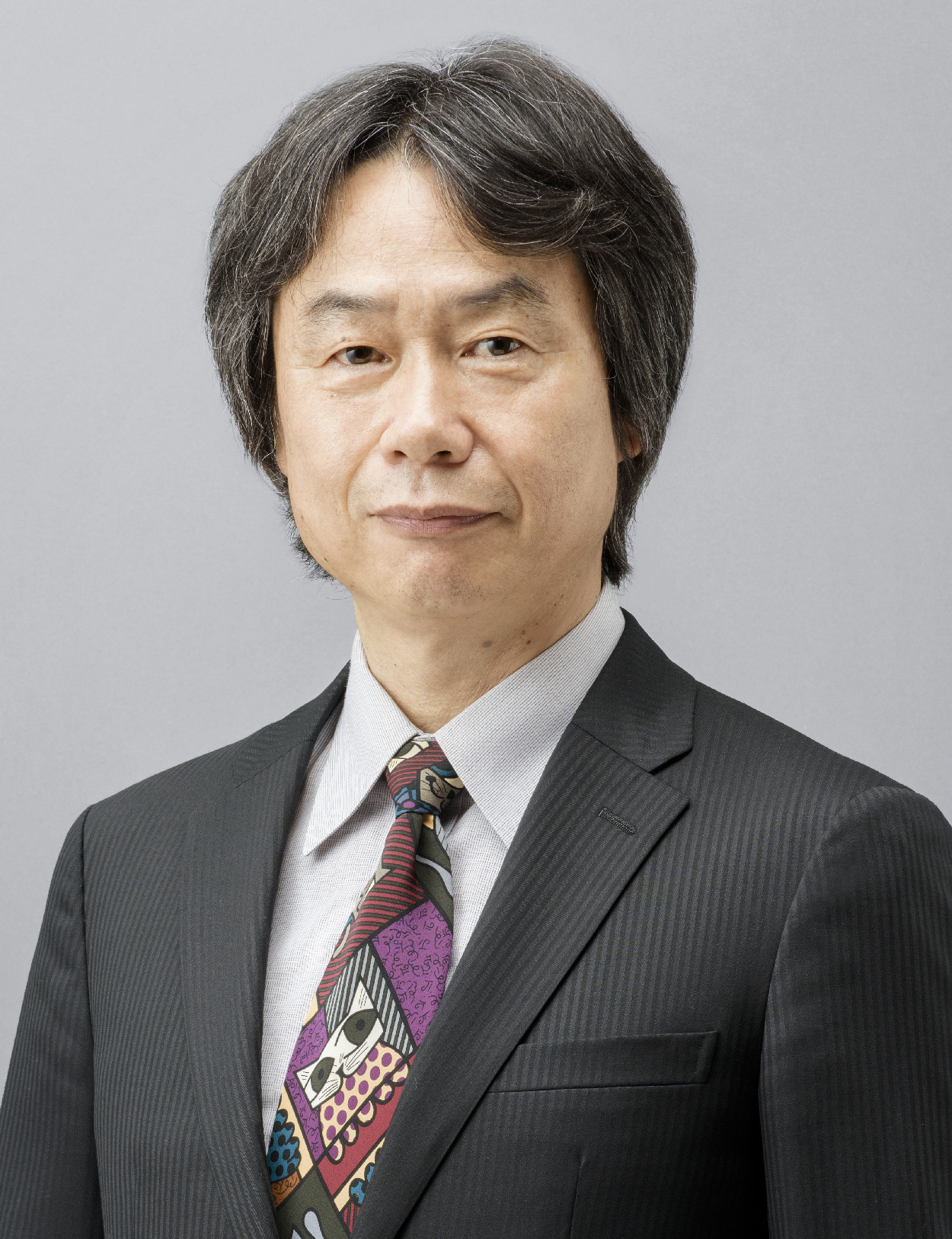
Satoru Iwata and Shigeru Miyamoto, Mother 3 producers

Iwata clarified that the franchise was not abandoned but that the game would no longer be developed for the Nintendo 64, and Miyamoto added that it was not due to project complications or development hell, but to resources needed for Project Dolphin (the GameCube). Some of the artists had been on the project for over three years. They estimated the project to be about 60 percent complete at the time of cancellation—the basics were complete and only programming was left. About 30 percent of the final product was completed. Itoi estimated that it would have taken an additional two years to finish properly, and Iwata said that the game might have been finished by 2000 had the scope been reduced two years earlier. Miyamoto was involved in other work and spent little time on-site with the project, and Iwata too was distracted by bankruptcy concerns at HAL Labs and was off-site in 1999 due to circumstances that required travel. Iwata was also hospitalized during production for stress-related reasons. The team intended to have the game finished by the end of 1999 and knew they had to reconsider their priorities when they missed the milestone. They said that the Mother 3 supervisors had wanted to cancel the project since 1999, but later changed sides and said that cancellation would be wasteful. They discussed bringing the game to their forthcoming GameCube, which Miyamoto said would have solved some of the Nintendo 64's hardware issues. Miyamoto and Iwata also discussed releasing the game on the Game Boy Advance, but realized that it would take "just as much time" with 40 to 50 staff members to make such a game. In retrospect, Iwata wondered out loud in an interview why the game needed to be in 3D when Itoi's "greatest talent lies in words" and thought that the energy poured into making a 3D game might have been a poor choice. He said he was "genuinely ashamed", and acknowledged that they were both "caught up in the 3D obsession and felt obligated" at the time. At the time of its cancellation, Itoi predicted that the game's story would remain one that only the game's staff would know, though he also expressed an interest in making the story into a novel or kamishibai if he had the time. Miyamoto was still interested in bringing the game to fruition.

=== Design ===
==== Conception ====
Flint within an inn, as compared between the Nintendo 64 and Game Boy Advance versions of Mother 3

Itoi conceived the premise of Mother 3 towards the end of Mother 2's production. He called another person on the project to describe a "detective story where the city was the main character". He envisioned a hack, small-time, womanizing private investigator who would become engrossed in a big murder case, and the story would unfold from a young female clerk at a flower shop who would slowly recall parts of a story consequential to the plot. Thus, the city would appear to grow. This idea of a "single place changing over time" was central to Mother 3. He saw previous RPGs as "road movies" with little reason for the hero to backtrack to previous areas, and instead wanted the player to see the town gossip grow dynamically. Miyamoto and Itoi compared this type of progression to the story of Legend of Zelda: Majora's Mask. The game was enough of a departure from the series that the development team questioned whether fans would consider it part of the series. Itoi wanted to change the style of the game from the prior two installments, wanting to evolve past the standard definition of the RPG genre.

Itoi originally intended the game to have 12 chapters with each having its own protagonist and varied game mechanics; for example, one with classic role-playing game mechanics and another as just cutscenes. He conceptualized the process as designing 3D "puppets" that could then be easily moved around the "stage". In actuality, each custom scene required special programming. The player-character changed between each chapter—a concept they first attempted in their previous game—so as to see multiple characters grow. As development wore on, Itoi offered to compromise by replacing full chapters with sequences of still images and text. They cut the total chapters to seven or nine by the time it was canceled. Itoi described the story as "normal" for its first half, leading up to a "triple-play twist". One of the game's themes was the reckless appearance and "uncomfortable beauty" of chimera—multiple creatures fused into one—which was the idea behind the metallic and wooden Mother 3 logo. Itoi has said of his role in the Mother series that he wanted to be more of a team member and scriptwriter and less of a manager in Mother 3's development. He saw himself as simultaneously making the game he wanted to play and setting traps for the player, and as making a game Nintendo could not. The game was intended to use the Nintendo 64’s Rumble Pak; the designers worried however that it would interfere with the battles.

My personal feelings steer me to want to affirm everything the player thinks about the game. I wanted to make Mother 3 like a mirror. One that reflects the heart of the player off of the screen.

— Itoi in an interview with Nintendo Dream, August 2006

The Mother 3 logo was made from a fusion of metal and trees, which Itoi interpreted as an "uncomfortable beauty" from two materials that were impossible to fuse. This is also a theme in his only novel. The chimeras theme informed the game's original subtitle: "Forest of the Chimeras". Itoi compared the reckless appearance of chimeras to the mutilated toys of Sid from Toy Story. The subtitle eventually became "The End of the Pig King" before the game was canceled; the final release has no subtitle because Itoi did not want to lead the player's interpretation.

Music for the game was developed by Shogo Sakai. Some of Sakai's music was able to be heard in the Space World playable demo for the game, which was unique among the demos present. This was stated to be due the game requiring sound for the battle gameplay to function properly.

==== Characters and environment ====
The game was set to continue 10 years after the first Mother. The game was to include over 10 playable characters and span 10 years in its story based around the Pig army, which attempts to use "primitive machinery ... to enslave mankind". The player-character, Flint, was a cowboy in the vein of Clint Eastwood with two boys, Lucca and Klaus (later becoming Lucas and Claus), and a dog, Boney. Lucas and Claus were named after a novel called The Notebook, a story about the bond between twins with the same names. Lucas's design changed multiple times throughout development, and originally greatly resembled art director Benimaru Itoh, resulting in a design change to avoid the resemblance. The player characters were also given visible storage devices due to Itoi always wondering where RPG protagonists stored all of their items. A pitched concept for Lucas was to allow him to gather flowers throughout the game and arrange his own garden, though Itoh wasn't certain if it was possible on the hardware given its technical challenge. The game was briefly considered to allow for multiplayer gameplay, though this quickly proved unfeasible and was scrapped.

At Space World 1999, IGN sampled environments including a hovercraft in a desert canyon, a snake dungeon, a cutscene with a bullet train, a town with non-player characters, and a mine cart scene, through themes including fantasy, the medieval, and science fiction. In an interview with the game's enemy designer, Toshinao Aoki, who decided the vast majority of enemies in the game, Aoki regarded that there were no plans for enemies from prior games to be used, and that he had near complete freedom with enemy design. A scrapped enemy mechanic, in which a player might drop food on the ground that would attract an enemy, was considered to be included using the 64DD technology. Aoki also stated that EarthBound antagonist Porky Minch was planned to be in the game, piloting a spider-like mech. This appearance would see Porky follow up on a statement made in EarthBound that he would escape to a different era, with EarthBound 64 to show him some time after traveling to the game's era. Itoi had a fondness for Porky, and also planned to bring back the Mr. Saturns from prior installments. The character of Dr. Andonuts was also planned to make a reappearance. A dragon, important to the plot, was also going to be included in the story. In 1997, the development team stated that there would be around 250 NPC designs and around 90 enemy designs, though that the numbers might change during development.

The scenario for the final battle was written while Itoi was overseas in Saipan. The design of the battle pit Lucas against his brother Claus. It remained in the final GBA version but was much darker in the Nintendo 64 version. As other aspects of the game moved forward Itoi was unable to decide on aspects of the final battle. He compared this to anime director Hayao Miyazaki directs his films. He once considered omitting dialogue from the battle to make it more vague and allow players to use their imagination. He also wanted to make players feel betrayed and disappointed by the ending.

According to Computer and Video Games Magazine's preview, a piece of hardware known as the "capture cartridge" was planned to be used to take photos and put real-world faces on the game's characters, though they remarked it was unclear if players would be able to do the same for enemies. Mario Artist, another 64DD game, was also originally planned to have a similar functionality, allowing players to customize the faces of NPCs in-game, though this was scrapped. A contest was held in Dengeki Nintendo 64 magazine for readers to submit their faces to appear in EarthBound 64 on non playable characters. Winners were ultimately chosen based on how impactful their faces were. These were ultimately never used due to the cancellation, and it is unclear if the further Game Boy Advance version of Mother 3, which used EarthBound 64 as a base, incorporated them in any way.

=== Shift to the Game Boy Advance and subsequent legacy ===
Itoi would be approached after the game's cancellation to adapt EarthBound 64 into a film or novel, though he rejected these proposals on the grounds that he believed the game was "a video game and nothing else".

Development of a sequel to EarthBound would later be shifted to the Game Boy Advance, where it would be released as Mother 3. EarthBound 64 served as a basis for the development and story of Mother 3, with many of its characters and concepts carried over to Mother 3. However, many changes were made to the game's story, gameplay, and design from the N64 version. For example, the game's player character, Lucas, would be drastically redesigned compared to the N64 version, who greatly resembled EarthBound's player character, Ness, and the planned final battle scene between Lucas and Claus was adapted with some slight differences as well. Some scenes were not carried over, however; scenes depicting a destroyed Onett, a town in EarthBound, are not present in Mother 3, for example. Additionally, Mother 3's art style was done using 2D pixel art rather than using three dimensional models like the N64, due to the Game Boy Advance's less powerful hardware. The game would be received positively by critics and players alike, though Mother 3 would never see a release outside of Japan, however. For fans of the series outside of Japan, efforts to translate the title were made, though the game is not obtainable outside of illegal means.

Prior to EarthBound 64's cancellation, Lucas was planned to appear in crossover fighting game Super Smash Bros. Melee as a playable character in place of Ness, who had been playable in the series previously. Lucas was scrapped due to the development issues surrounding EarthBound 64 at the time, resulting in Ness being retained. Lucas would later be included as a playable character in Super Smash Bros. Brawl and its subsequent installments as a playable character following Mother 3's Game Boy Advance release.

According to Mother 3 debugger Brendan Sechter, EarthBound 64 was shown to Mother 3's developers as inspiration; Sechter believed the playable copy shown off was likely either still with Brownie Brown, who developed Mother 3, or had been returned to Nintendo or HAL at some point following the completion of development.

== Reception ==
IGN was impressed by the mine cart sequence shown at Space World 1999.

In 1997, a poll held by IGN stated that only 30% of readers would buy an N64 if it came packaged with EarthBound 64; 10% voted it as one of five RPG series they would like to see on N64. Polls on N64.com in the same year showed that players were less likely to be willing to buy a 64DD to play the game compared to The Legend of Zelda: Ocarina of Time, which was also originally slated for release via the 64DD. Overall, however, the game was a highly anticipated title for N64 players. Famitsu readers ranked the game as one of their top ten most anticipated towards the end of 1999. In a poll held by IGN in 2000, EarthBound 64 showed strong rankings, landing in the top twenty most wanted upcoming games, though fell lower on the chart than prior rankings due to a lack of new information released at the time. In another IGN poll held in Japan the same year, Mother 3 was ranked fourth on a list of games people were most excited to play.

Paul Davies remarked in Computer and Video Games Magazine that the game was shaping up to be the best looking RPG of all time, comparing it against the recently released Final Fantasy VII. Nintendo Power suggested that the game could become one of the most important launch titles for the long-delayed Nintendo 64DD. In its review of the Space World 1999 demo, IGN found the mine cart scene—where Lucas and Klaus outrun a collapsing cave in a minecart—to be its "most impressive" sequence. GameSpot similarly wrote positively of the minecart sequence, writing that it was one of the most graphically impressive sequences seen on the N64. IGN said that the controls were intuitive, the sound "well orchestrated and memorable", the 3D game engine "strong", and the battle system "confusing". They wrote that the game would be highly original, but were not able to tell the degree to which the story or characters would interact. IGN compared the multi-character aspect of the narrative to the Japan-only Super Famicom RPG Live A Live. According to Miyamoto, the game was positively received following its showcase at Space World.

Fans in Japan expressed their thoughts about the game's cancellation to Famitsu shortly following the announcement of its cancellation, with responses being mostly negative due to high anticipation. The cancellation of EarthBound 64 caused the Mother fandom to become more active, with loud calls within the community for a sequel to be released, including petitions by fans. One of these petitions was reported on by IGN, which noted one poll that focused on ensuring a United States release and aimed for 10,000 signatures from fans. A petition led by fansite Starmen.net rallied just over 10,000 fans of the series to support a release, though this was unsuccessful. Miyamoto later stated in an interview that, had the production team known of the numerous fans in the USA waiting for the game, they might have made a different choice in development rather than cancelling the game outright. Scenes depicting this time were featured in the documentary EarthBound USA, which focused on the history of the Mother series in the United States. Fans of the series have considered finding a playable copy of the game to be a "holy grail" discovery for the fandom due to the game being playable at trade shows but otherwise not being released since then.

Writing for IGN in 2003, Fran Mirabella stated that EarthBound 64 was the cancelled project they most wished to see revived. GamesRadar+ regarded the game as losing most of its "charm" in a 3D environment, however, remarking that, with the Game Boy Advance adaptation "fans finally got the game they wanted".
