= Flint (Mother 3) =

Mother 3 character

- Mother character
- Flint in Mother 3
- First game: Mother 3 (2006)
- Created by: Shigesato Itoi

In-universe information
- Relatives: Lucas and Claus (sons); Hinawa (wife)

Flint (Japanese: フリント, Hepburn: Furinto) is a character in the 2006 video game Mother 3. He is the husband of Hinawa, and the father of protagonist Lucas and his brother, Claus. He is the star of the first chapter, and loses control after learning of his wife being killed by a creature called a Drago. Claus is lost after pursuing revenge against Drago, and he spends years searching for Claus. Flint was designed by the game's creator, Shigesato Itoi, and was featured in the cancelled Nintendo 64 version of the game, EarthBound 64. They were initially concerned about Flint's search for Claus dragging on until a staffer who had a child said that it made sense for Flint to search every day, leading them to include this aspect.

Flint has been generally well received, and his breakdown was the subject of analysis and discussion, including an IGN Japan writer using his anger over his wife's death as symbolism over how he felt about the 2011 Tōhoku earthquake and tsunami. His relation to his family is also discussed, particularly how his grief manifests compared to Lucas and Claus. A rumor was formed that Flint was actually Ness, the protagonist of the preceding game. Itoi stated that this came up during development, and he intended that if people wanted to believe this, they could.

== Appearances ==
Flint first appears in the video game Mother 3 (2006), being the father of Lucas and Claus and husband of Hinawa. In the first chapter, Flint and his dog Boney work to help evacuate people from a burning forest, as well as look for his family, who was visiting his father-in-law. His children wash up at a river shore, and Flint later learns that Hinawa was killed by a creature called a Drago. He loses control and attacks people around him before being knocked out and put in jail. He later pursues Claus, who went to get revenge, and encountered the Drago that killed Hinawa, which had been turned into a cyborg by an unknown military force. After defeating it in battle, he chooses to spare it, though it dies from its injuries regardless.

Flint spends several years searching for Claus and visiting Hinawa's grave without any luck while Lucas spent much of these years apart from Flint. Flint appears in the final chapter, aiding Lucas in battle. He falls along with Lucas' party down an elevator shaft, rushing ahead. He becomes injured, and informs Lucas that the Masked Man, a figure Lucas had fought before, was in fact Claus, who has been modified by the antagonist Porky to be his slave. During the battle between Lucas and Claus, Flint jumps in front of an attack to protect Lucas, taking significant damage, doing further damage as Flint pleads for him to remember. Claus eventually regains his memories upon hearing Hinawa's voice, and ends up taking his own life.

Outside of Mother 3, Flint also makes appearances in Super Smash Bros. Brawl and Super Smash Bros. Ultimate.

== Concept and creation ==
Flint is a farmer described as a "Clint Eastwood-like cowboy". He is almost always seen wearing his hat, only losing it once, revealing that he is bald. He was created by Shigesato Itoi. During development, the staff debated on how to handle Flint's story following Claus' disappearance, with Itoi worrying that it would drag on. A staff member who had recently had a child stated that he believed that was in keeping with a father to search for his son every day, which led to this element being included in the story. Extra dialogue was given to Flint near the end of development at the end of the game. with Itoi stating he begged to be able to add it in.

== Reception ==
IGN writer Esra Kurabe discussed Flint's anger over the loss of his wife in the context of the 2011 Tōhoku earthquake and tsunami, stating that Flint punching the ground in anger symbolized to him the loss of life in the incident. Destructoid writer chose this moment as a particularly strong moment in video games, praising the scene for depicting Flint's rage visually without needing any dialogue to convey, finding it the most powerful scene in Mother 3. RPGFan staff discussed how shocking the scene was for the early moments of a Game Boy Advance game, discussing how the town reacts to his grief. They felt it was particularly shocking due to seeing a protagonist attack their friends, adding that Flint's anger from his grief contrasted his sons' grief, where Lucas grieves by crying and Claus grieves by getting revenge. They also discussed how a hallucination featuring Flint threatening to assault Lucas may indicate that Flint is a violent father. RPGFan writer Alana Hagues commented on how watching Flint struggle in his grief affected her due to her grief as well as others she knew who have dealt with grief.

Paste writer Dave Tomaine discussed how Lucas related more to Hinawa than Flint, noting how the two differ in how they approach things. He also discussed Flint's absence, where he focuses more on searching for Claus than he is raising Lucas. AV Club writer William Hughes discussed the absence of fathers in the Mother series, noting how Flint is initially an exception to this trend before falling into the trend after the loss of his wife and son. He argued that it was telling that Wess, Duster's abusive father, cared more for Duster than Flint for Lucas due to at least being around. A rumor existed that Flint and Ness, the protagonist of EarthBound, the previous entry in the Mother series, were the same person. In response, Itoi stated that he was unsurprised that such rumors would exist, and that he expected it all the way back during the Nintendo 64 version of the game. He noted that whether Flint was Ness came up during development, and thus decided to write Flint so that people who wanted to believe he was Ness could believe it. Nintendo Dream staff speculated that Flint receiving an item called the Franklin Badge, wearing a hat, and being able to talk to animals, qualities also true of Ness, caused more people to believe this.
