= Giygas =

Mother series antagonist

- Mother character
- Giygas as he appears in EarthBound
- First appearance: EarthBound Beginnings (1989)
- Last appearance: EarthBound (1994)
- Created by: Shigesato Itoi

In-universe information
- Species: Alien

Giygas (/ˈɡiːɡəs/ GEE-gəs, alternatively /ˈɡaɪɡəs/ GY-gəs), also known as Giegue in EarthBound Beginnings, and Gyiyg (ギーグ, Gīgu) in Japan, is a fictional alien character in the Mother video game series by Nintendo, created by Shigesato Itoi. The character serves as the main antagonist and final boss of EarthBound Beginnings and its sequel, EarthBound. In the series, he invades Earth in an attempt to wipe out humanity in EarthBound Beginnings, and returns in EarthBound where he conquers the world and sends his forces into the past to prevent protagonist Ness from defeating him. The battle against Giygas, which depicts him in turmoil, drew inspiration from a Japanese film which traumatized Itoi as a child. He has received positive reception with critics referring to his battle as one of the creepiest in video games, and considered one of the greatest and most iconic video game antagonists of all time.

== Concept and creation ==
Giygas was designed and written by the creator of the EarthBound series, Shigesato Itoi, and debuted in the original EarthBound Beginnings, where he is called Giegue in the English localization. In an interview on his website, Itoi describes how his inspiration for the final battle with Giygas in EarthBound resulted from a traumatic childhood event where he accidentally viewed the wrong movie at a theater, a Shintoho film entitled Kenpei to Barabara Shibijin. The film featured a murder scene near a river that Itoi mistook for a rape scene which affected him so much that his parents began to worry about his well-being. Years later, Itoi integrated the experience into Giygas' dialogue for the final battle. Itoi described Giygas as something that people cannot make sense of, but also as a living being who deserves love, whereas the community also depicts him as a being of pure evil. He described the film scene as a combination of atrocity and eroticism, and that is what his lines are in the end. While designing this battle, Itoi spoke all of the text out loud while another staff member, Matchan Miura, wrote it down. He spoke each hiragana character one-after-another because he found it scarier. There has been a misunderstanding regarding the influence of the film on Giygas, with some believing that imagery, dialogue, or audio from that film were used here, when the only thing Itoi took from it was the ability to "manipulate an audience's emotional state". Music composer Hirokazu Tanaka described Giygas as the "embodiment of evil". As a result, he composed the music in a certain way based on the player's proximity to him. For example, in battles where Ness and company encounter someone or something under Giygas' control, the music and sound effects reflect this.

Before the release of EarthBound, the localization team had at one point considered localizing Giygas as his original name Giegue or Geek. It was speculated that the change from Giegue to Giygas was due to a change in localization staff. An urban legend exists that suggests that the final battle with Giygas in EarthBound was an "alien abortion". Marcus Lindblom, a member of the English localization team, acknowledged the urban legend, noting that he appreciated the speculation, but officially denied the idea was an intended interpretation.

== Appearances ==
Giygas appears in the Family Computer (also referred to as the Famicom) video game EarthBound Beginnings. Giygas was raised by Maria, a woman abducted along with her husband George by Giygas' alien race from Earth in the early 1900s. George studied the aliens' PSI powers without permission and escaped back to Earth. Once he matured, Giygas was tasked by his people to make sure that PSI never spread onto Earth. However, Giygas did not want to betray those who raised him, particularly Maria. In the end, he forced himself to detach from Maria and began preparations for the aliens' invasion. Eighty years later, strange things start happening on Earth. These events are eventually revealed to be the work of Giygas. Maria, now a Queen in a magical world called Magicant, explains everything to the protagonists of EarthBound Beginnings after her memories are restored. When the protagonists encounter Giygas, he explains his motives to them while attacking them with his PSI power. Maria urges her descendant, the also PSI-user protagonist Ninten to sing her Eight Melodies, which weakens Giygas. Ninten, Ana, and Lloyd sing together, forcing Giygas to surrender and flee.

Giygas also appears in the Super NES/SNES sequel EarthBound. Giygas is an unseen villain for most of the story, although he possesses the evil inside of humans, animals, and objects who unknowingly do his bidding. According to a character from the future named Buzz Buzz, Giygas destroys the universe ten years in the future. One of his key minions is Pokey Minch, a boy who lived in Ness's neighborhood. At first, Dr. Andonuts (the father of playable character Jeff) believes that Giygas is residing deep within the Earth, and transports himself and the party there using a machine called the Phase Distorter. When they arrive, they find that Giygas is attacking from that exact location, but from innumerable years in the past. The only way the protagonists can get to Giygas' time period is to alter the Phase Distorter to transport them back in time. When the group finally reaches Giygas, he initially resembles Ness while in the device called the "Devil's Machine". Pokey reveals that Giygas' PSI power has grown so strong that it destroyed his mind and drove him mad. Pokey then turns the Devil's Machine off and releases Giygas, who now takes the form of a swirling red agonized face. At this point, Giygas' words and attacks are nondescript and nonsensical, more akin to a stream of consciousness than anything else. Giygas is eventually destroyed by Paula, who prays to the protagonists' friends and family for help. Her praying eventually reaches the player, and the combined prayers do enough damage to Giygas to kill him.

== Reception ==
Since appearing in EarthBound, Giygas has received largely positive reception. His role and design was regarded as contrasting with the otherwise lighthearted tone of the rest of EarthBound's story by Brittany Vincent for G4TV. Cassandra Ramos for RPGamer identified him as one of her favorite villains, while 1UP.com staff described the battle with Giygas as one of the 25 best boss battles, citing the audio and imagery of Giygas as well as the final portion of the battle. Jeremy Parish for 1UP.com used the battle as an example of how games subvert expectations, where the protagonists employ prayer instead of their most powerful attacks to win. IGN staff included the battle with Giygas in their list of the 10 most cinematic video game moments. NGamer UK staff listed Giygas as one of the most iconic boss encounters in Nintendo history, stating that the defining moment was his design and the method of defeating him. GamesRadar+ staff named him one of the best video game antagonists, finding him creepy and a more imposing villain than Kefka Palazzo from Final Fantasy VI. Staff for Complex, GameSpot, and UGO Networks listed the fight against Giygas as one of the hardest in video games, with the latter and Chloi Rad for IGN calling him one of the most frightening video game characters. He was featured in a GameSpot user-voted poll of the greatest villains in video games, where he lost in the first round to Star Wars: Knights of the Old Republic antagonist Darth Malak.

Nadia Oxford for IGN described the battle with Giygas as one of the most memorable moments in EarthBound and stated that its significance resonated with people who had not played the game, a sentiment that Cassandra Ramos of RPGamer shared. In a work for 1UP.com, Oxford claimed that Itoi took inspiration from Stephen King novels, including It. She suggested that Giygas was based on It's antagonist due to a similarly "borderline indescribable" form and the fact that they both succumb to childlike qualities such as faith, friendship, and love. She discusses how the battle with Giygas in EarthBound Beginnings deviates from traditional final boss battles, citing his deep motivations and music employed, which consists of a "shrill background noise" and a lullaby. She suggested that Giygas' degraded form in EarthBound was possibly the result of Giygas' longing for Maria's love. Patricia Hernandez for Nightmare Mode discussed how his Mother incarnation "echoes a motif" of children without parental guidance doing poorly because of it. Colin Snyder for Vice felt similarly, stating that his story is about the loss of childhood. William Hughes for The A.V. Club argued that Giygas had an oedipal complex due to his infatuation with his surrogate mother and hatred for his surrogate father over him stealing information from the aliens.
