= Lucas (Mother 3) =

Mother 3 protagonist

- Mother character
- Lucas in Super Smash Bros. for Nintendo 3DS and Wii U
- First game: Mother 3 (2006)
- Created by: Shigesato Itoi

In-universe information
- Relatives: Flint (father); Hinawa (mother); Claus (brother)

Lucas (リュカ, Ryuka) is the protagonist of the 2006 video game Mother 3. He is the brother of Claus and son of Flint and Hinawa. Lucas's family is attacked by the Pigmask Army, resulting in Hinawa's death while protecting her children from an aggressive, modified Mecha-Drago, and Claus' disappearance. Described as a crybaby, he spends years grieving their losses as he grows up. Along with his dog Boney and friends Duster and Kumatora, he goes on a quest to oppose this army and their actions. Lucas was created by the game's creator, Shigesato Itoi, and he went through multiple design changes starting with EarthBound 64.

Lucas appears as a playable character in multiple entries of the Super Smash Bros. series, starting with Super Smash Bros. Brawl. Critics analyzed his relationship with his family, particularly Claus, whose final battle with Lucas was generally well received. Multiple critics discussed how emotional the fight was and that it made them think of the idea of losing their own siblings.

== Appearances ==
Lucas first appears in Mother 3 (2006), a resident of Tazmily Village on Nowhere Islands. He is the son of Flint and Hinawa and brother of Claus. Over the course of the beginning of the story, Hinawa is killed by a Drago who had been modified by people called the Pigmask Army, and Claus goes missing after seeking revenge on it, leading Lucas to spend much of his days grieving while Flint searches for Claus every day. He later becomes involved in the fight against the Pigmask Army alongside his dog Boney, which had been systematically influencing the village with "Happy Boxes" and destroying any homes without one. He later meets others opposed to the Pigmask Army, including Duster, a thief, and Kumatora, a tomboy princess. After becoming separated from his group, he finds himself in a sunflower field with Boney, a vision of his mother appearing. He follows and jumps after her, falling off a cliff as a result. He and Boney land safely on haystacks placed there by his grandfather Alec and Duster's father Wess, who were told by Hinawa to do so in a dream.

Lucas is tasked by beings called Magypies to pull seven needles sealing a dragon away who sleeps under Nowhere Islands, stating that the wishes of the person who pulls the most needles will affect how the dragon will behave once awoken. He also discovers that another individual is pulling these needles called the Masked Man. Along his quest, he reunites with Kumatora and Duster. Lucas does battle with the Masked Man multiple times, eventually discovering that he is actually Claus, rebuilt and made into a slave by the leader of the Pigmask Army, Porky. After defeating Porky, Lucas encounters Claus again on his own, finding himself unable to fight back. Claus regains his senses after hearing their mother's voice, using his lightning to kill himself. Lucas pulls the last needle, causing the dragon to awaken and island to be destroyed, though everyone winds up surviving the process thanks to the dragon.

Lucas appears in multiple entries in the Super Smash Bros. series. He was originally planned to be included as a playable character in Super Smash Bros. Melee to replace Ness, the protagonist of EarthBound who appeared in Super Smash Bros. for the Nintendo 64. This plan was dropped following the cancellation of EarthBound 64, the version of Mother 3 planned for the Nintendo 64, and Ness remained as a character in Melee. Lucas made his first appearance in the series in Super Smash Bros. Brawl, included alongside Ness. This appearance was the first time many players outside of Japan became aware of Lucas. He was not included in Super Smash Bros. for Nintendo 3DS and Wii U initially, but was added as downloadable content. He was again included in Super Smash Bros. Ultimate. In this game, one of his attacks has Kumatora and Boney accompany him. His addition to the Nintendo 3DS and Wii U games came with a figure of him called an Amiibo. This Amiibo, when used with Super Mario Maker, allowed the protagonist Mario to make himself look like Lucas. In addition to his Amiibo, Nintendo also released plushies of Lucas.

== Concept and creation ==
Lucas was created by Shigesato Itoi, the creator of Mother 3. Lucas and Claus were named after the narrators of the book The Notebook (1986) by Ágota Kristóf. During this point, the boys were called Lucca and Klaus. His character is described as a "crybaby". Lucas went through multiple design changes in EarthBound 64, featuring two incarnations that were completely different from one another. In Mother 3 on Game Boy Advance, Lucas has blonde hair and a striped shirt. The concept of Lucas and Claus fighting each other at the end of the game was planned from the beginning of development. Itoi stated that one version lacked dialogue and was meant to be vague about how the game ends.

== Reception ==
RPGFan writer Alana Hagues felt that the final fight between Lucas and the Masked Man was one of the most emotional battles she has ever had in a video game. stating that seeing Lucas' mother coming through, Claus coming to his senses, and Lucas remembering his childhood, was "heart-wrenching". The loss at the end of this fight made her question whether saving the world was worth it if Lucas still has lost so much. In an article for Nintendo Life, Hagues stated that part of what made Lucas able to be strong was memories of his mother through his grief, believing that Lucas leaping for his mother in chapter 6 represented Lucas' trust in her that he would jump off a cliff. She felt that, despite being a silent protagonist, Lucas' "kindness and resilience [made] him relatable and empathetic". Fellow RPGFan writer Wes Iliff found the relationship between Lucas and Claus particularly compelling, stating that he saw himself and his brother in their relationship, that he and his brother fulfilled the archetype of "the timid and anxious younger sibling who tagged along with the bold and courageous older sibling". Iliff, having lost his brother a few years prior to playing Mother 3, stated that he appreciated seeing a "side of grief" he rarely sees portrayed in fiction.

Destructoid writer Chad Concelmo discussed the relationship between Lucas and Claus, commenting that he was "ridiculously close" to Claus, and losing both him and his mother forced him to become more self-reliant and brave. He noted how emotional the final fight made him, stating that the scene was so affecting that he had to call his own brother to tell him how important he was to him. In analyzing Mother 3 through a queer lens, The A.V. Club writer Dave Tomaine discussed how Lucas' "queerness" emerges early in his grief; he argued that, where Claus grieves his mother by seeking revenge, Lucas does so by crying and visiting his grave. He believed that the hardening of the citizens of Tazmily Village only amplified how different he is from everyone else, stating that "he stays soft, he cares so much, he just wants to help". He felt that the Magypsies bequeathing lipsticks and razors represented the ability for Lucas to choose his own path in life. Tomaine believed that Lucas had a "gentleness in strength" that he saw in the queer people around him, citing how Lucas' magical power is "quite literally a love beam" and how he refuses to fight back against Claus in their final battle. He believed that Lucas proved that he was always the strongest of the family, and that letting himself cry allowed him to be the one to save the world.
