= Ness (EarthBound) =

EarthBound protagonist

- Mother character
- Ness in EarthBound
- First game: EarthBound (1994)
- Created by: Shigesato Itoi
- Voiced by: Makiko Ohmoto

Ness (Japanese: ネス, Hepburn: Nesu) is a fictional character in the Mother role-playing video games published by Nintendo, created by Japanese video game designer Shigesato Itoi. His first appearance was in the 1994 Super NES game EarthBound (known as Mother 2 in Japan), the second entry from the series, in which he serves as the game's protagonist and playable character. He also appears as a playable fighter in the Super Smash Bros. series of fighting games where he is voiced by Makiko Ohmoto.

Ness is depicted as a thirteen-year-old (Note: Swan, p. 120.) boy residing in the fictional town of Onett in Eagleland who has psychic abilities referred to as PSI. In EarthBound, Ness teams up with several other characters to battle Giygas, the main antagonist of the game and a recurring character in the series. He has received generally positive reception, and his appearance in the Super Smash Bros. series has contributed to a rise in popularity in both him and EarthBound. His relationship with his parents has been the subject of commentary, as well as how he compares to other role-playing game protagonists.

== Concept and creation ==
Ness is the protagonist of EarthBound, the second game in the three-part Mother series. He was created by Shigesato Itoi, the creator of the Mother series, who intended the game to have real characters whom players would recognize in the people around them. A character resembling Ness was seen in early Space World video for the Nintendo 64 version of Mother 3, with some speculating him to either be Ness or Claus; an interview with Shigesato Itoi in Dengeki Nintendo in 1997 confirmed that the character was neither, but a character exclusively made for promotional material "to make the world of "MOTHER" easier to understand". When discussing the character Flint, Itoi stated that he was open to the interpretation of him and Ness being the same character. He was originally going to be replaced by Lucas, the main protagonist of EarthBound's sequel Mother 3, in Super Smash Bros. Melee, but Ness was used after all when Mother 3's Nintendo 64 release was ultimately cancelled. They both later appeared in Super Smash Bros. Brawl, Super Smash Bros. for 3DS and Wii U (though Lucas was initially excluded and added through DLC), and Super Smash Bros. Ultimate. He is voiced by Makiko Ohmoto in the Super Smash Bros. series.

== Appearances ==
Ness appears in EarthBound as the main playable protagonist, living in the town Onett in Eagleland. Ness possesses extremely powerful PSI abilities latent from birth that develop as the game progresses. Ness primarily utilizes baseball bats as offensive weapons against enemies. (Note: Swan, p. 6.) At the beginning of the game's story, a meteorite crash-lands near Ness's house, leading to him going with his neighbor Pokey to discover a time-traveling alien called Buzz-Buzz, who states that Ness is the "chosen one" that can defeat the entity named Giygas, who in the near future destroys the universe. In order to prepare for the battle against Giygas, Buzz-Buzz instructs Ness to travel to eight sanctuaries in different areas of Eagleland, where he can absorb their psychic energies in order to unite his power with that of the Earth. During his journey, Ness teams up with Paula and Poo, who also possess PSI, and Jeff, a boy-genius. Meanwhile, Pokey allies with Giygas and antagonizes Ness throughout the game. After Ness, Paula, Jeff, and Poo visit all eight sanctuaries, Ness falls unconscious and enters Magicant, a realm within his mind. There, Ness vanquishes a personification of his evil thoughts, amplifying his powers. Ness, now fueled with unlimited power, awakens, after which the four characters learn that to battle Giygas they must time travel to the past. They put their souls in robots and travel to the past to battle Giygas and Pokey. Giygas is defeated, and Pokey escapes, though after everyone returns home, Pokey sends Ness a letter challenging him.

Ness appears as a playable fighter in every entry of the Super Smash Bros. series. Though EarthBound sold poorly in the United States, Ness became popular through his addition to the Super Smash Bros. fighting game series roster, where he appeared in all five games: the original Super Smash Bros. and its sequels Melee, Brawl, 3DS/Wii U, and Ultimate. In addition to attacking with a baseball bat and a yo-yo, Ness' strengths revolve around his psychic abilities. One ability allows Ness to hit himself and propel himself forward or upward, resulting in both recovery and offense. In Brawl, Ness gained a "Final Smash" move based on Poo's "PK Starstorm".

Ness has received multiple pieces of merchandise, including a yo-yo, Amiibo figure, and more.

== Reception ==
Ness has received generally positive reception, considered one of the best Nintendo characters by Destructoid writer James Herd. He was listed as one of the greatest video game characters, with the authors of the book "100 Greatest Video Game Characters" stating that Ness represented an "everyboy" hero who defied typical role-playing game stereotypes, feeling that he was a trailblazer in terms of protagonists in the genre. They also suggested his outfit evoked Charlie Brown from Peanuts, while his character design evoked anime or manga art, calling him a "highly recognizable and beloved" Nintendo character who has a cult fanbase. He has been a popular character in the Super Smash Bros. series, where he was considered to be partly responsible for players becoming interested in EarthBound by Polygon.

ITMedia writer Mayumi Asai discussed how Ness' relationship with Porky, specifically how Ness views Porky in his own mind. Namely, she discussed how Ness' manifestation of Porky appeared as someone who was jealous of Ness and wanted to be friends with him. She analyzed this as Ness looking down on Porky, suggesting that Ness was ignoring Porky's feelings, and discussed how Magicant was used to show how Ness was more than just "good". Nintendo Life writer Nile Bowie felt that Ness and his friends being made to sacrifice their bodies to fight Giygas represented the end of their childhood, feeling becoming machines represented dehumanization and alienation as people grow up. He also felt that Giygas having Ness' face at the start of the fight against him represented that this was also a battle for Ness to retain his humanity and goodness. Eurogamer writer Rich Stanton felt that, despite being "program code and a handful of sprites stitched together", he was able to connect with Ness on a deeper level than he was compared to characters like Nathan Drake, who he sees as merely a "video game character". He discussed Ness' relationship with his parents, saying it was the most important factor in his character due to how Itoi utilized them to tie into gameplay. He also praised Itoi for making the dialogue feel naturally written between two people who are close. He felt that this relationship resonated with him strongly, partly due to Ness acting as a silent self-insert character for the player. AV Club writer William Hughes also discussed Ness' connection with his parents, discussing how Ness relies on his mother to provide emotional support while his dad represents an absentee father who provides financial support. Nintendojo writer Robin Wilde felt that Ness could be interpreted as a Jesus Christ-like figure due to his unifying position, fighting evil, and being prophesized by Buzz Buzz to do so. They also cited Ness' ability to reform people, such as Frank Fly and the Happy Happy Village.
