= Porky Minch =

- Mother character
- Porky in EarthBound
- First game: EarthBound (1994)
- Created by: Shigesato Itoi

In-universe information
- Species: Human
- Gender: Male

Porky Minch (Japanese: ポーキー・ミンチ, Hepburn: Pōkī Minchi), known in the North American localization as Pokey Minch, is a fictional character in the Mother series, also called EarthBound. He serves as one of the main antagonists of EarthBound, and the main primary antagonist in its sequel, Mother 3. Porky is the neighbor of the protagonist, Ness, but eventually finds himself under the influence of the main antagonist, Giygas, whom he aids in the final battle. He eventually flees after Giygas' defeat. In Mother 3, he is responsible for the majority of the game's narrative, having traveled through time and manipulating an island of people to cause destruction that suit his whims.

Porky was created by Shigesato Itoi, who discussed how his terrible disposition was caused by things like parental neglect, and how Porky viewed his actions as "having fun" rather than being plain evil. His character was well received by critics and fans alike, who noted that Porky was someone who initially yearned for a normal life with good family and friends, but fell to evil due to his loneliness.

== Concept and creation ==
Porky Minch was created for EarthBound, titled Mother 2 in Japan, by the game's director, Shigesato Itoi. In the localized version, he was called Pokey. Itoi discussed how his bad disposition may have been caused by being neglected by his parents. He described Porky as a symbolism for humanity's flaws, noting how he didn't think Porky viewed himself as evil, instead stating that Porky thought he was just having fun. In the Japanese version of EarthBound, Porky is depicted being physically punished by his father, but the English version was changed to simply being refused access to dessert for a decade.

== Appearances ==
Porky as he appears in Super Smash Bros. Brawl (left), using his design from Mother 3. He is visibly aged and utilizing a spider-like mecha.

Porky appears in EarthBound as one of its main antagonists, called Pokey in English. He is initially a neighbor to the protagonist, Ness, joining him temporarily while searching for his brother, Picky. He separates from the team when they return with Picky, getting physically punished by his father for going out at night. Porky later appears along Ness' journey, revealing that he was now a minion of Giygas, the main villain of the game. He appears multiple times throughout the game trying to prevent Ness and his friends from defeating Giygas. He finally appears in the fight against Giygas in the past, operating a spider robot and battling Ness. After Giygas is defeated, Porky flees, and later leaves a note taunting Ness and challenging him to come find him.

He appears once again in Mother 3, though he spends much of the game operating in the background. In Mother 3, an army known as the Pigmasks is wreaking chaos across the Nowhere Islands, modifying animals and killing people. One Chimera's attack kills the protagonist Lucas' mother, Hinawa, and causes his brother, Claus, to go missing; the Pigmasks manage to locate Claus, who is made into a mechanical Chimera to serve Porky.

Lucas and his friends are later invited to New Pork City by Porky, now known as its king, where they discover that the Nowhere Islands were established when people from the rest of the world fled to it, losing their memories in the process. Porky, having traveled through time, eventually discovers the island, and decides to play with it. Once they reach the top of the Empire Porky Building, they discover that Porky is actually extremely old and frail, explaining that his goal was to use Claus, one of the only two who could pull the needles, to awaken the Dark Dragon, killing everyone but the Dark Dragon and himself. They battle Porky, who eventually hides himself in the Absolutely Safe Capsule, ensuring that it would be impossible for him to die, but also impossible for him to exit.

A pop-up shop themed after New Pork City in Mother 3 was set up, featuring merchandise themed after Porky, as well as other characters from the series. Porky also appeared in Super Smash Bros. Brawl, where he acts as a boss opponent.

== Reception ==
Porky has received generally positive reception. Destructoid writer Chad Concelmo discussed how sad Porky's descent was in EarthBound, noting how his "playful, rotund" features are lost by the end of the game, instead replaced by a sickly aesthetic. RPGFan staff discussed Porky as an RPG villain, comparing him to a combination of "every kid you ever hated in grade school as well as billionaire fascists of both fiction and history".

In an article discussing parenthood in the Mother series and what it represents, The A.V. Club writer William Hughes felt that Porky's abusive father and uncaring mother may have been what caused Porky to become such a horrible person as an adult. He further argued that Pokey helps reinforce the notion that a loving mom is necessary to have a "semblance of sympathetic goodness in their lives". He also drew comparisons between Pokey and Giygas in this respect, noting how Giygas remains sympathetic due to having a loving mother, despite having a neglectful father. Musician Kenichi Maeyamada felt he was only interested in money and power, contrasting him to EarthBound's main cast due to their single-minded progression. He discussed how Mother 3 reflected how Porky seemed to view Ness, and in light of the Porky in Ness' mind, made him feel sad over Porky. He also felt that his motivations for his actions came from loneliness.

Translator Clyde Mandelin discussed the localization changes, particularly changing Porky's parents to be less harsh towards him. He believed that this had the effect of a reduced examination of Porky's abusive household in the English version. Author Laure Trintignant discussed Porky's abuse, echoing the sentiment that the localization took away from Porky's character. They suggested that the fact that Porky's animosity towards Ness derived from Ness having a dad who cared about his family.
