= Shogo Sakai =

Japanese composer (born 1960)

- 酒井 省吾
- Born: September 23, 1960 (age 66); Kawasaki, Kanagawa, Japan
- Education: Meiji Gakuin University
- Occupations: Composer; musician
- Years active: 1983–present
- Employers: Data East (1987–1996); HAL Laboratory (1996–2023)
- Musical career
- Genres: Video game music; orchestral; chiptune; jazz
- Instruments: Guitar; piano

Shogo Sakai (酒井 省吾, Sakai Shōgo; born September 23, 1960) is a Japanese composer who primarily works on video games. He is best known for composing for Mother 3, as well as various Kirby and Super Smash Bros. games. Currently a freelance composer, he was employed at Data East from 1987 to 1996 and HAL Laboratory from 1996 to 2023.

== Early life ==
Sakai was born on September 23, 1960 in Kawasaki City, Kanagawa Prefecture, Japan. He grew up playing guitar, and at junior high school he wrote music for ensemble for a local competition. At high school he formed a band, serving as its guitarist.

== Early work and Data East ==
During his final year studying at the Faculty of Economics at Meiji Gakuin University, he received the opportunity to routinely visit the studios of TBS Television, where he studied under the music directors of The Best Ten and the Japan Record Awards. Although he was impressed by the talent of the performers on the shows, he concluded that it was better for him to focus on composing than performing. After graduating, he worked at a Yamaha vocal school and played keyboards there. His debut as a composer was co-composing for the stage play Yamato Takeru, performed at Nippon Seinenkan in 1986.

Sakai joined game company Data East in 1987, primarily as a composer but also worked on sound direction and production, as well as providing support to other sound staff. He was also part of the in-house band Gamadelic. After being asked to write orchestral music for the Glory of Heracles games, he started to listen to and expand his interest in classical music.

Koichi Sugiyama, who is best known for composing for Dragon Quest games, highly praised Sakai's work on Glory of Heracles IV: Gift from the Gods and said he wanted to perform it with an orchestra, with Kosuke Onozaki orchestrating. Sakai said he wanted to orchestrate and conduct himself and Sugiyama accepted, despite having no prior experience. When it was performed at Game Music Concert 5 in Shibuya Public Hall on October 29, 1995, each half of the ensemble initially played out-of-sync, so Sakai told them to stop and play again. After the second take went smoothly, he was praised by Sugiyama's wife. He had sent an invitation to HAL Laboratory to attend Game Music Concert 5, which resulted in game director Masahiro Sakurai attending, as music from Kirby Super Star was also performed there prior to its release.

== HAL Laboratory ==
In 1996, he sent a demo tape of music he proposed for EarthBound 64 to HAL. After being accepted a position as a sound creator, he subsequently left Data East and joined the company, becoming the game's main composer. Shigesato Itoi had chosen him over outsourcing to previous composers Keiichi Suzuki or Hirokazu Tanaka, feeling he understood the game the most. He listened to music from EarthBound for reference purposes, but felt that his musical style was quite different. Takuto Kitsuta, who had also transferred to HAL from Data East, handled sound programming, sound effects, and composed additional techno-styled music. The game was ultimately cancelled in 2000, but development was restarted in 2003 for the Game Boy Advance, and released as Mother 3 in 2006. He served as the sole composer for the GBA iteration, composing hundreds of tracks. "Love Theme" was notably composed very late into the game's development, which Sakai completed very quickly.

In 2001, he composed for Super Smash Bros. Melee with Hirokazu Ando, as well as arranging tracks from other Nintendo games along with Ando, Kitsuta and Tadashi Ikegami. During development, it was decided to utilize a live orchestra for some tracks, so Sakai coordinated with studios, engineers and performers. Although Ando was initially slated to be the game's sole composer, director Masahiro Sakurai was unsatisfied with the opening theme that he had composed, so Sakai composed it instead. He later served as one of the composers for Super Smash Bros. Brawl in 2008.

One of the first Kirby games he composed for was Kirby Air Ride in 2003, working with Jun Ishikawa, Ando, and Ikegami. He found it challenging to accommodate Sakurai's requests and feedback, which included having to increase the tempo and add extra elements to the music of Frozen Hillside, and rewriting the music of Fantasy Meadows multiple times. He also served as a music producer for later episodes of Kirby: Right Back at Ya! and created music along with other HAL composers and Hayata Akashi.

In 2017, he handled all music and sound effects for HAL's smartphone game Part Time UFO. The director Teruhiko Suzuki requested him to create Nintendo Entertainment System-styled chiptune music, which made him feel nostalgic for working on NES games at Data East.

== Freelance work ==
In early 2023, Sakai left HAL Laboratory and became a freelance composer; he has continued to compose for its games, similar to Ishikawa who left shortly after. One of his first works after leaving was composing the track "Bits & Beats" for Street Fighter 6, added as part of an update in 2024. In 2025, he composed the stage music for Kirby Air Riders with Noriyuki Iwadare. Sakurai picked both of them as the lead composers, due to their proficiency at composing orchestral music, as well as with conducting orchestras and making sheet music. He also aimed for the music to have melodies that children could sing along to, giving both composers extensive feedback on their tracks.

Sakai will create two tracks for the upcoming racing game Star Garden, after the game reached its crowdfunding goal of $180,000 in 2025.

== Notable works ==
| Year | Title | Role(s) | Ref. |
|---|---|---|---|
| 1988 | Donald Land | Music with Shinichi Kamizono and Takafumi Miura | |
| 1988 | Be-Bop High School: Kōkōsei Gokuraku Densetsu | Music with Hiromichi Nakamoto, Takafumi Miura, and Shinichi Kamizono | |
| 1988 | Cobra Command | Music with Masaaki Iwasaki and Takafumi Miura | |
| 1988 | Captain Silver | NES version; music with Takafumi Miura and Yuji Suzuki | |
| 1988 | Rampage | NES version; arrangements with Takafumi Miura | |
| 1989 | Al Unser Jr.'s Turbo Racing | Music with Takafumi Miura, Masaaki Iwasaki, and Yuji Suzuki | |
| 1989 | Bad Dudes | NES version; music with various others | |
| 1989 | RoboCop | NES version; music with Takafumi Miura, Masaaki Iwasaki, and Yuji Suzuki | |
| 1989 | Bloody Wolf | TurboGrafx-16 version; music with Takafumi Miura, Yuji Suzuki, and Yusuke Takahama | |
| 1989 | Glory of Heracles II: Titan's Downfall | Music with various others | |
| 1990 | Werewolf: The Last Warrior | Music with Takafumi Miura and Yusuke Takahama | |
| 1990 | Heavy Barrel | NES version; music with various others | |
| 1990 | Boulder Dash | NES version; music with Takafumi Miura and Yusuke Takahama | |
| 1990 | Lock 'n' Chase | Game Boy version; music with Takafumi Miura, Yusuke Takahama, and Yuji Suzuki | |
| 1990 | Tantei Jingūji Saburō: Toki no Sugiyuku Mama ni... | Music with various others | |
| 1991 | Midnight Resistance | Genesis version; music with Hitoshi Sakimoto | |
| 1991 | Silent Debuggers | Music with various others | |
| 1991 | Vapor Trail: Hyper Offence Formation | Genesis version; music with Naoki Matsumura and Daisuke Inoue | |
| 1992 | Glory of Heracles III: Silence of the Gods | Music with various others | |
| 1992 | Captain America and The Avengers | Music with Tomoyoshi Sato and Hitoshi Sakimoto | |
| 1994 | Karnov's Revenge | Music with Mihoko Ando | |
| 1994 | Glory of Heracles IV: Gift from the Gods | Music with various others | |
| 1995 | Minnesota Fats: Pool Legend | Music with various others | |
| 1995 | Fighter's History: Mizoguchi Kiki Ippatsu!! | Music with Hiroaki Yoshida | |
| 1995 | Outlaws of the Lost Dynasty | Music with Taihei Sato, Mihoko Ando, and Tatsuya Kiuchi | |
| 1996 | Avengers in Galactic Storm | Music with Seiichi Hamada, Ring Ring, and Takuto Kitsuta | |
| 1996 | Magical Drop II | Music with Hiroaki Yoshida and Masaaki Iwasaki | |
| 1996 | Virtua Fighter 2 | Genesis version; sound director | |
| 2001 | Super Smash Bros. Melee | Music with Tadashi Ikegami, Hirokazu Ando, and Takuto Kitsuta | |
| 2002 | Kirby: Nightmare in Dream Land | Music with Jun Ishikawa, Hirokazu Ando, and Tadashi Ikegami | |
| 2003 | Kirby: Right Back at Ya! (episodes 72-100) | Anime; music with various others | |
| 2003 | Kirby Air Ride | Music with Hirokazu Ando, Tadashi Ikegami, and Jun Ishikawa | |
| 2006 | Mother 3 | Music | |
| 2006 | Kirby: Squeak Squad | Music with Hirokazu Ando, Jun Ishikawa, and Tadashi Ikegami | |
| 2008 | Super Smash Bros. Brawl | Music with various others | |
| 2011 | Face Raiders | Music | |
| 2011 | Kirby Mass Attack | Music | |
| 2012 | Kirby's Dream Collection | Music with Hirokazu Ando and Jun Ishikawa | |
| 2015 | Kirby and the Rainbow Curse | Music with Megumi Ohara | |
| 2015 | Picross 3D: Round 2 | Music with Megumi Ohara and Hirokazu Ando | |
| 2017 | Kirby Battle Royale | Music with Megumi Ohara | |
| 2017 | Part Time UFO | Music | |
| 2022 | Kirby's Dream Buffet | Music with various others | |
| 2024 | Street Fighter 6 | Update; "Bits & Beats" | |
| 2025 | Kirby and the Forgotten Land + Star-Crossed World | Music with various others | |
| 2025 | Kirby Air Riders | Music with various others | |
| 2026 | Magical Girl Lyrical Nanoha Exceeds Gun Blaze Vengeance | Anime; "Sunlight" | |
| TBA | Star Garden | Music with various others | |
