= Mother 3 =

2006 video game

- Japanese box art
- Developers: Brownie Brown; HAL Laboratory
- Publisher: Nintendo
- Director: Nobuyuki Inoue
- Producers: Shinichi Kameoka; Kensuke Tanabe; Keisuke Terasaki
- Artist: Nobuhiro Imagawa
- Writer: Shigesato Itoi
- Composer: Shogo Sakai
- Series: Mother
- Platform: Game Boy Advance
- Release: JP: April 20, 2006
- Genre: Role-playing
- Mode: Single-player

Mother 3 (Note: Japanese: マザースリー, Hepburn: Mazā Surī) is a 2006 role-playing video game developed by Brownie Brown and HAL Laboratory and published by Nintendo for the Game Boy Advance. It is the third and final entry in the Mother series. The game follows Lucas, a young boy with psychic abilities, and a party of characters as they attempt to prevent a mysterious invading army from corrupting and destroying the world.

Like previous entries, Mother 3 focuses on exploring the game world from a top-down perspective and engaging in turn-based combat with enemies. Its development spanned twelve years and four consoles, beginning in 1994 for the Super Famicom and then transitioning to the Nintendo 64 and its 64DD add-on, when it was known as EarthBound 64. It was initially canceled in 2000, but development was restarted in 2003 for the Game Boy Advance. The game is noted for its significantly more mature and dramatic tone than its predecessors, exploring themes such as environmentalism, capitalism, consumerism, loss and grief, and rebellion against tyranny. However, it still retains much of the series' characteristic witty, idiosyncratic aesthetics and humor.

Mother 3 was never localized or released outside Japan, due to its release near the end of the Game Boy Advance's lifespan and the company focusing on the Nintendo DS. However, it was a critical and commercial success in the years that followed and has generated a cult following, in which it received praise for its character development, stylized graphics, music, and story.

An unofficial English fan translation was released by the Starmen.net internet community in 2008, and received over 100,000 downloads within a week. Mother 3 was re-released for the Wii U's Virtual Console in Japan in 2015, and for the Nintendo Classics service exclusively in Japan in 2024.

== Gameplay ==
Mother 3 is a single-player role-playing video game similar to previous games in the Mother series. The player controls a party of playable characters who explore the game's two-dimensional fictional world, primarily shown from a top-down perspective. While navigating the overworld, the player may converse with non-player characters, obtain items, or encounter enemies. Winning battles against enemies awards experience points to the party, which is required for leveling up. Leveling up a character permanently enhances its individual attributes such as maximum hit points (HP), power points (PP), offense, and defense. Weapons, armor, or accessories can be equipped on a character to increase certain attributes. The player can restore their characters' HP and PP or heal various status ailments by visiting hot springs which are abundant in the game world, and the player can save the game by talking to frogs. Currency is introduced in the later half of the game as Dragon Power (DP), earned by winning battles and used to purchase items. The player can deposit or withdraw DP from frogs.

In a battle sequence, the player can perform combo attacks by repeatedly striking to the beat of the background music.

Mother 3 retains the turn-based battle system featured in EarthBound. When the player comes into contact with an enemy in the overworld, the game transitions to a battle screen. Battles are viewed from a presumed first-person perspective, showing the enemies against a distorted, animated background. The player can assign each character in their party to perform an action, such as attacking an enemy or using items to restore HP or PP. Some characters can utilize psychic-based abilities referred to as PSI, which includes stronger attacks and healing abilities, but require PP to execute. Like EarthBound, combat uses a "rolling health" system: when one of the player's characters is injured, their HP will gradually "roll" down, similar to an odometer, rather than be immediately decremented. This allows a mortally wounded character to perform actions like attacking or healing themselves if the player acts quickly enough. If a character's HP reaches 0, they will fall unconscious and be unable to perform any actions until they are revived by another character. The player loses a battle if all characters become unconscious; the player will then be given the option to continue play from the nearest save point, but with half the DP on their person.

Combat in Mother 3 includes a unique musical combo system absent from previous Mother games. When one of the player's characters directly attacks an enemy with a weapon, they can repeatedly attack the enemy by pressing the button in time with the beat of the background music, with each enemy possessing a musical theme with different rhythms. Using this system, the player can attack the enemy up to sixteen times in a row. When the correct beat is not apparent, the player can put the enemy to sleep to isolate the beat from the music.

== Plot ==
Mother 3 is set in the fictional Nowhere Islands, an unknown length of time after the events of EarthBound. The game begins with twins Lucas and Claus and their mother Hinawa preparing to return home to Tazmily Village after visiting Hinawa's father, Alec, who lives in the northern reaches of the Islands. Before they can return, Tazmily Village is attacked by a mysterious military force known as the Pigmask Army, who bomb the nearby forest and start a forest fire. Hinawa's husband, Flint, is alerted to the fire and sets out to rescue his family. He finds Lucas and Claus, but discovers that Hinawa was killed defending them from a hostile Drago, a normally peaceful dinosaur-like creature. Later, Claus leaves the village to take revenge on the Drago; Flint attempts to follow him, discovering and defeating the Drago, which has been turned into a cyborg, but fails to find Claus.

In response to the Pigmasks' invasion, novice thief Duster is sent by Wess, his father and teacher, to the abandoned Osohe Castle to retrieve the mysterious Egg of Light. While there he meets the spirited young Princess Kumatora, but both he and the Egg are caught in a trap and vanish. At the same time a mysterious peddler known as Yokuba, (Note: Renamed Fassad in the fan translation) who works with the Pigmasks, introduces the concept of currency and sells television-like devices known as Happy Boxes to the townspeople, with the unwilling help of a monkey named Salsa whom he abuses. Salsa escapes from Yokuba's control with the help of Kumatora, Lucas, and Wess.

Three years later, Tazmily Village has been taken over by the Pigmask Army, who have modernized it with railways, Happy Boxes, and other modern technology. Lucas hears rumours that Duster, who has been missing since leaving for Osohe Castle, is working as a bassist at the nearby Club Titiboo, and sets off with his dog Boney. While travelling there, he learns psychic powers from Ionia, who is a superpowered, benevolent, androgynous creature known as a Magypsy. At the club, he finds Kumatora working as a waitress, as well as Duster, who is suffering from amnesia. They join to recover the Egg and restore Duster's memory, but while attempting to board a flying Pigmask airship, a mysterious Masked Man shakes them off and sends them flying to the ground, separating them.

Lucas, Kumatora, Duster and Boney (left to right) exploring the overworld

Lucas and Boney land in a haystack back in Tazmily, and learn from the Magypsies that beneath the Islands is a massive, sleeping creature known as the Dark Dragon. The Magypsies' purpose is to guard seven Needles that were placed in the dragon to control its power; whoever pulls most of the Needles will be able to use the dragon's incredible power to completely reshape the world. Because of this, the Masked Man is trying to find and pull the Needles. Lucas and Boney reunite with Duster and Kumatora and race to pull the Needles before the Masked Man, but only manage to pull three, with the Masked Man pulling another three.

The seventh and final Needle is located beneath New Pork City, the capital of the Pigmask Army. Lucas and company travel there, invited by King P and meet Leder, another villager, who reveals that the inhabitants of Tazmily Village are the last survivors of a global apocalypse, who travelled to the Nowhere Islands as they were protected by the dragon's power. To prevent a second apocalypse from occurring, the survivors sealed their previous memories in the Egg of Light; Leder was given the role of revealing the truth if the situation called for it. He also reveals that the leader of the Pigmasks is Porky Minch (known as Pokey Minch in Mother 2), who, after the events of Mother 2, travelled in time to the Nowhere Islands and began building an empire there, kidnapping inhabitants from other time periods (including Dr. Andonuts from Mother 2) to populate it, and transforming the local wildlife into twisted new forms for his amusement (including the Drago that killed Hinawa).

Lucas and company set out to confront Porky and pull the last needle. While fighting their way to him, they discover that Yokuba was the Magypsy responsible for protecting the seventh Needle, who betrayed them and started working for the Pigmasks. The heroes finally meet Porky on the 100th floor of New Pork City's Empire Porky Building, where he taunts Lucas and company in a monologue, mocking humanity foolishly sealing their memories and revealing he intends to destroy the world to satiate his boredom. He sends them deep beneath New Pork City to play a twisted race, where he ends up facing them to stop the heroes from pulling the final needle, but he seals himself inside an "Absolutely Safe Capsule" built by Dr. Andonuts; unbeknownst to him, however, Andonuts has tricked him, as the Absolutely Safe Capsule also renders the outside world safe by permanently sealing Porky within it.

Lucas reaches the seventh needle and confronts the Masked Man, who is revealed to be a brainwashed Claus. During the battle between Claus and Lucas, Hinawa's spirit speaks to the boys and begs them not to fight. This eventually causes Claus to remove his mask and commit suicide by casting lightning at Lucas's magic-reflecting Franklin Badge. Lucas pulls the final Needle, awakening the Dragon and destroying the Nowhere Islands.

In an epilogue set in pitch darkness, the game's cast reveals that they have survived and wish the player farewell. After the credits, the Mother 3 logo is shown restored to being made completely of wood.

== Development ==
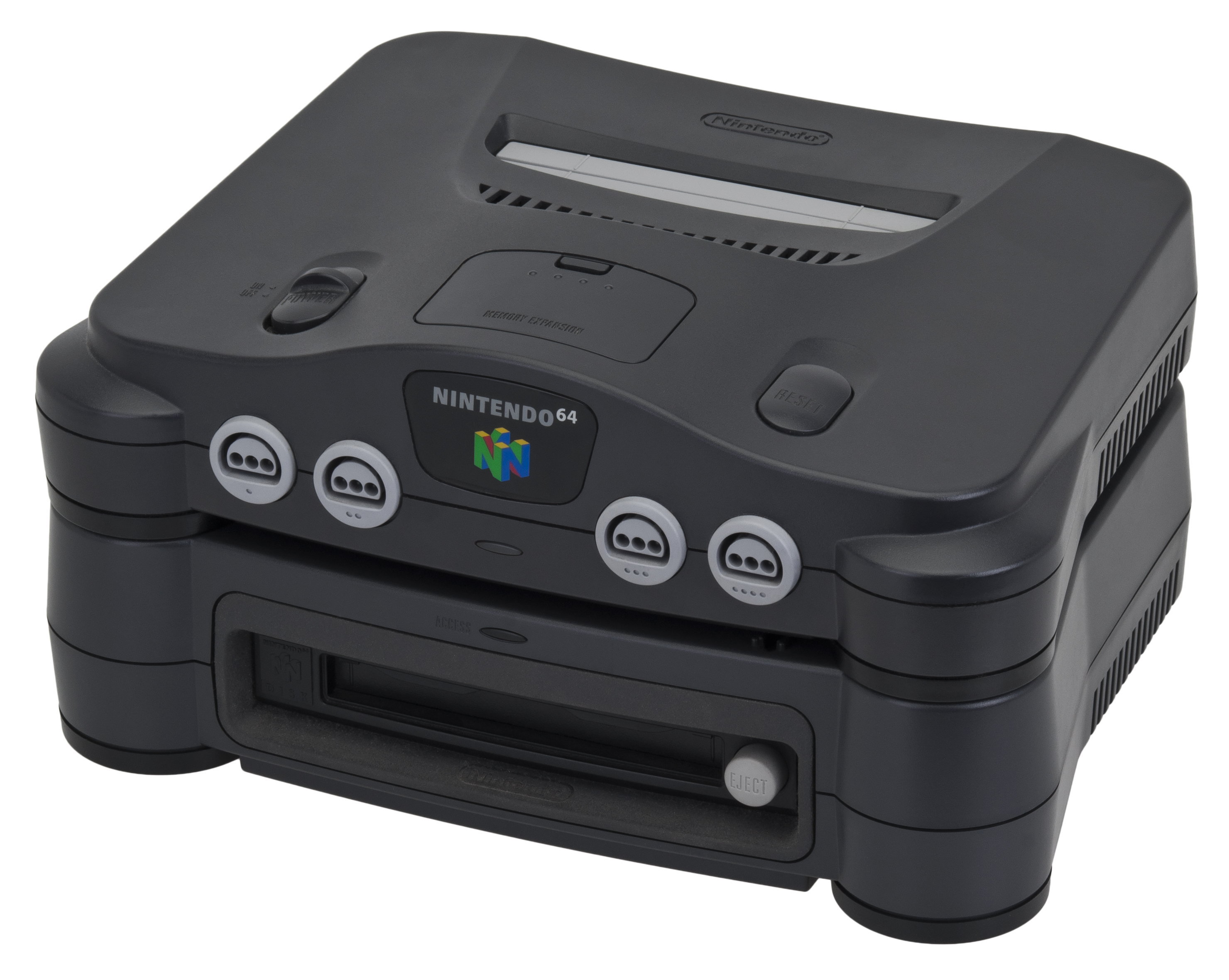
The game was designed for the 64DD add-on, shown here as docked beneath the Nintendo 64.

Development of Mother 3 began in 1994 for the Super Famicom with Shigeru Miyamoto and Satoru Iwata as producers. By this point, Mother series creator Shigesato Itoi had worked on the series' earlier games and Itoi Shigesato no Bass Tsuri No. 1 and was experienced at pitching video games, so Miyamoto provided a team willingly. The team mostly consisted of members involved in the development of the previous Mother game, though several people left and the team grew in size. According to Miyamoto, the decision to create Mother 3 was a commercial one due to the success of its predecessor. They forwent the usual prototyping phase and went straight into development expecting to create something unprecedented. Itoi said he wanted to make the game like a Hollywood film. Inspired by Super Mario 64, the team transitioned from the Super Famicom to the Nintendo 64, believing that they could also creatively flourish by making a 3D world without technical restrictions. In September 1994, he predicted that Mother 3's development would end around 1996 with a release on Nintendo's then-upcoming console. Their early specifications exceeded the capabilities and memory limits of Nintendo 64; halfway through development, the team scaled back its large scope and changed the platform to the 64DD, a Nintendo 64 expansion peripheral that was later released only in Japan in 1999. At E3 in June 1997, Miyamoto speculated that Mother 3 would be one of the four games for the then-expected 1998 launch of the Japan-only peripheral. Development eventually shifted back to the Nintendo 64 after the 64DD's commercial failure.

Nintendo showcased a demo of Mother 3 at the 1999 Nintendo Space World trade show. It was expected to be released in North America under the title EarthBound 64, on a 256-megabit cartridge, similar to The Legend of Zelda: Ocarina of Time. IGN reacted favorably to the demo and compared the multi-character narrative to the Japan-only Super Famicom RPG Live A Live, and Famitsu readers ranked the game as one of their top ten most anticipated towards the end of 1999. IGN stated that the game seemed "very far along" and half complete. Following a period of media silence, the announcement of its conversion from 64DD disk to 256 megabit cartridge plus mission expansion disk was taken by IGN as a sign of further delay or cancellation of the 64DD altogether. The game was considered enough of a departure from the series that the development team questioned whether fans would consider it part of the series.

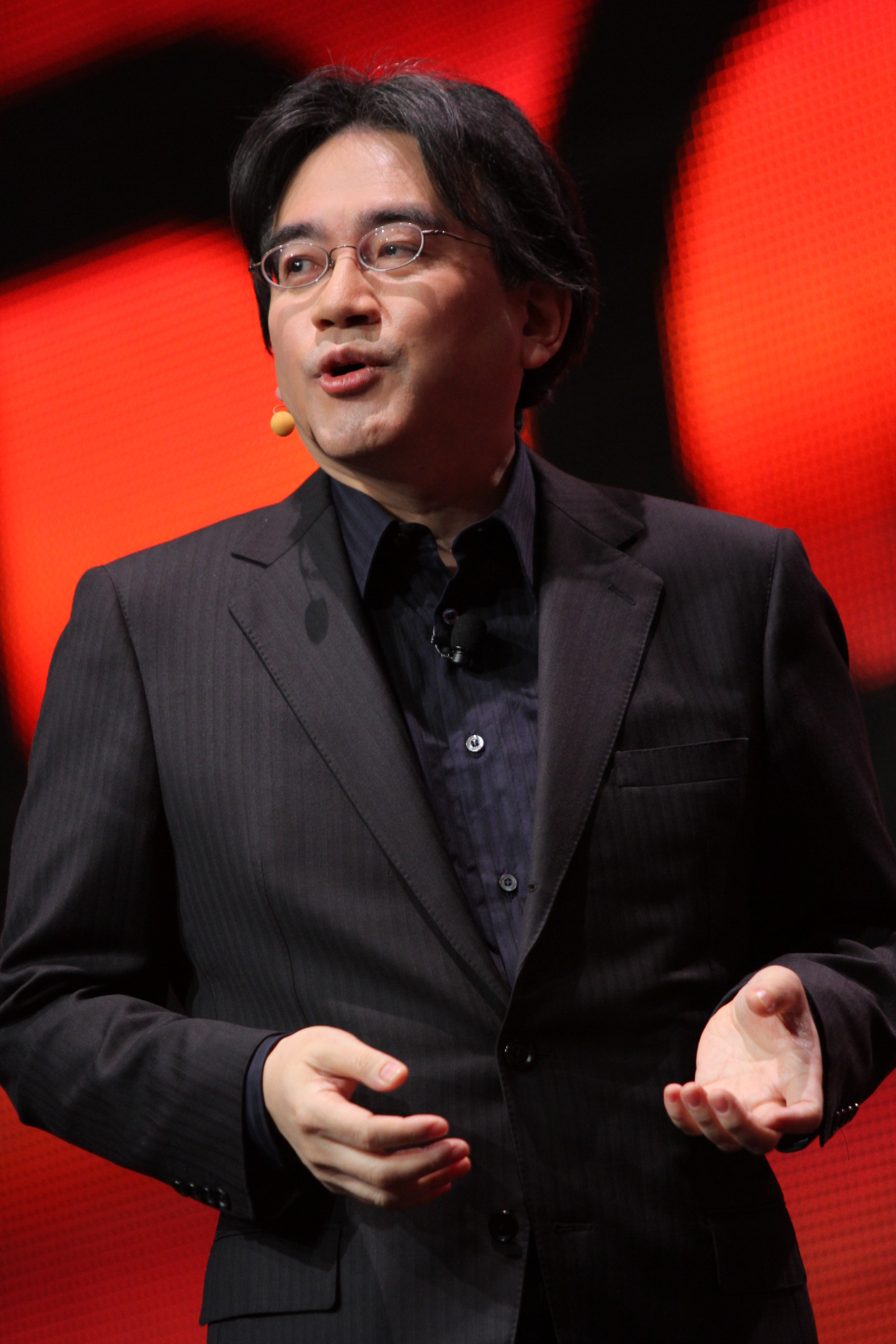
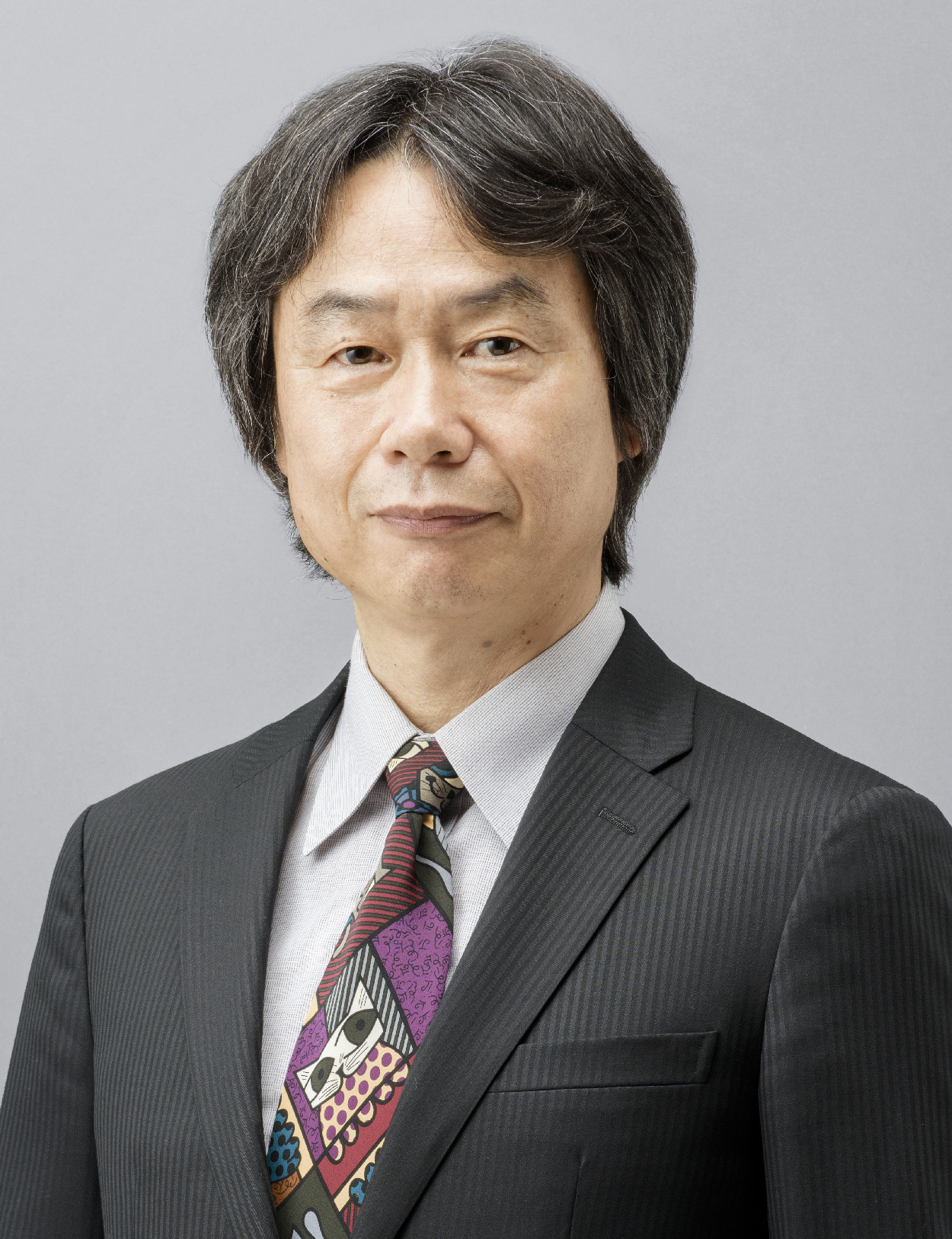
Satoru Iwata and Shigeru Miyamoto, Mother 3 producers

In 1999, the development team failed to meet the milestone that was set. This led to discussion about cancelling the game, which was rejected under the belief that it would be wasteful to do so. A release on the forthcoming GameCube was discussed, which Miyamoto said would have solved some of the Nintendo 64's hardware issues. Itoi eventually announced in late August 2000 that Mother 3 had been cancelled following a number of delays. Iwata and Miyamoto clarified in an interview that resources had been moved to the development of the GameCube. Itoi stated that an additional two years would have been required to finish the game, which was 30% complete at the time of cancellation. Iwata stated retrospectively that the focus on 3D graphics made the project overcomplex. He stated his belief that, had the game's scope been reduced two years earlier, it may have been able to be released in 2000. Other issues emerged, including Miyamoto being involved in other work with little time spent on-site with the project, and Iwata being too distracted by bankruptcy concerns at HAL Labs and stress-related health issues. Miyamoto stated that the Mother franchise had not been abandoned and that he was still interested in bringing the game to fruition. Miyamoto and Iwata also discussed releasing the game on the Game Boy Advance, but realized that it would take "just as much time" with 40 to 50 staff members to make such a game. In retrospect, Iwata wondered out loud in an interview why the game needed to be in 3D when Itoi's "greatest talent lies in words" and thought that the energy poured into making a 3D game might have been a poor choice. He said he was "genuinely ashamed", and acknowledged that they were both "caught up in the 3D obsession and felt obligated" at the time. At the time of its cancellation, Itoi predicted that Mother 3 would remain a story that only the game's staff would know, though he also expressed an interest in making the story into a novel or kamishibai if he had the time.

In 2003, in a Japanese commercial for the compilation game Mother 1+2, Nintendo announced that it had restarted the development of Mother 3 for the portable Game Boy Advance console. Itoi had believed that restarting the project was impossible but changed his mind following encouragement from the Mother fanbase. Nintendo subsidiary Brownie Brown developed the game, with input from Itoi. While the graphics were changed from 3D to 2D, the story was not altered. Mother 3 was about 60% complete by July 2004. It was slated for a late 2005 release in Japan and was eventually released on April 20, 2006.

=== Design ===
Flint in an inn setting, as compared between the Nintendo 64 and Game Boy Advance versions

Itoi thought of the concept behind Mother 3 towards the end of Mother 2's production, a "detective story where the city was the main character". He thought of a hack, small-time, womanizing private investigator who would become engrossed in a big murder case, and the story would unfold from a young female clerk at a flower shop who would slowly recall parts of a story consequential to the plot. Thus, the city would appear to grow. This idea of a "single place changing over time" was central to Mother 3. Unlike previous RPGs, which he saw as "road movies" with little reason to revisit, he wanted the player to see the town gossip grow dynamically. It was enough of a departure from the series that the development team questioned whether fans would consider it part of the series. Itoi intended the game to have 12 chapters with various game mechanics and rotating player-characters. This revolving player-character mechanic was first attempted in Mother 2. He gave examples of different kinds of chapter concepts, such as one with classic role-playing game mechanics and one that was only cutscenes. He conceptualized the development as moving 3D puppets before realizing the degree of programming required. As development wore on, he proposed that some chapters could be replaced with still images and text. Itoi reduced the scope of the chapters until seven or nine were left. He described the story as being "normal" in the first half before leading up to a "triple-play twist". The game was set to continue 10 years after the first Mother. The player-character, Flint, was a cowboy in the vein of Clint Eastwood with two boys, Lucca and Klaus (later becoming Lucas and Claus), and a dog, Boney. The game was to include over 10 playable characters and span 10 years in its story based around the Pig army, which attempts to use "primitive machinery ... to enslave mankind". At Space World 1999, IGN sampled environments including a hovercraft in a desert canyon, a snake dungeon, a cutscene with a bullet train, a town with non-player characters, and a mine cart scene, through themes including fantasy, the medieval, and science fiction. Physical contact with an enemy in the overworld triggered a turn-based battle scene shown in the first-person (similar to EarthBound). The battles had psychedelic backgrounds and a circular menu that included a command to "get up" if the player was knocked down in a real-time sequence. Attacks could be timed with the in-game music for stronger effects. The developers also planned multiple routes for advancing through the game and unforeseen complications from minor actions, such as a monster finding food dropped in the forest. The game was set to include features such as synching the game's time with the real time, but those features required the 64DD. Mother 3 was set to run between 40 and 60 hours in length.

The "uncomfortable beauty" of chimera—multiple creatures fused into one—was central to the game and the idea behind the metallic and wooden Mother 3 logo. The Mother 3 logo was made from a fusion of metal and trees, which Itoi interpreted as the discomfort of two materials that were impossible to fuse. The chimeras theme informed the game's original subtitle: "Forest of the Chimeras", which eventually became "The End of the Pig King" before the game was cancelled. The final release had no subtitle because Itoi did not want to lead the player's interpretation. Itoi served less of a manager role and more as a team member and scriptwriter than in previous Mother development cycles. He saw himself as simultaneously making the game he wanted to play and setting traps for the player, and as making a game Nintendo could not.

Itoi chose to use the pixelated style of Mother 2 for the Game Boy Advance Mother 3 because he was uninterested in computer graphics trends. The series' games were written in the hiragana alphabet instead of in kanji (Chinese characters) so as to remain accessible to young children. Itoi described the game world as governed by a "might equals right ... macho" power struggle. The antagonist, Porky, was designed as a "symbol of humankind", complementing Itoi's view of evil on a fungible morality spectrum with "pranks" and "crimes" at its extremes. He also likened its tone to the lyrics of the song "Reunion" by Kazuko Matsuo, where the subject falls in love with someone the world finds evil. Itoi compared the way in which the characters realize their psychic powers with menstruation and added that human physiology was "one of his themes". Players sweat when learning an ability based on Itoi's belief of how physical struggle facilitates growth. He also included characters like the Magypsies and Duster (who has a bad leg) to show the value of having friends with different qualities. Some environments were added to serve specific purposes. For example, Osohe Castle was meant to show the scale of time and Tantane Island was designed to reflect the player's worst nightmares as similar to Mother 2's "hallucinatory city", Moonside. Parts of the game reference outside media such as Kiki's Delivery Service, a film by Studio Ghibli, a company for which Itoi had written film taglines and had voiced the father in My Neighbor Totoro.

Another of his themes is the duality of the seriousness and lightheartedness of games, which is why he added a serious death scene to the first chapter. Itoi wrote the game's ending while overseas in Saipan before Mother 3 was canceled. This Nintendo 64 version of the final battle was darker, "dirtier", and more upsetting, though the final version changed little in concept. Itoi attributed the change in tone to his own growth and the character composition of the new development team. Itoi later reflected on the ending's lesson on the virtue of helping bad people. Itoi always planned for the two brothers to fight each other, though he did not write the ending until after production had already begun, a process he compared with Hayao Miyazaki's. Itoi processed each line individually as he wrote the final scene, and later reflected on its moral content that bad people sometimes need even more help than the good people. He said that the one line that makes him most emotional is, "You must be tired". Itoi felt that the ending's renewal theme reflected his worldview of appreciating our time on Earth in light of the planet's inevitable end. Much of the rest of the script was written after-hours at a local hotel where they would continue their work.

=== Music ===
Shogo Sakai, a video game composer at HAL Laboratory whose previous works include music for Kirby Air Ride and Super Smash Bros. Melee, composed Mother 3's soundtrack. Shigesato Itoi stated that Sakai was chosen for the role given his deep understanding of the game's story and the EarthBound series in general, in addition to the fact that EarthBound composers Keiichi Suzuki and Hirokazu Tanaka were both unavailable. Sakai worked to make the music feel similar to previous entries in the series. The Mother 3 soundtrack was released on compact disc on November 2, 2006. Kyle Miller of RPGFan wrote that the game retained the quirkiness of the previous soundtracks in the series despite the change in composers. He found the second half of the album, which included reinterpreted "classics" from the series, to be its strongest.

"Love Theme"
A 10-second sample of the game's theme, highlighting the song's simplicity.

"Love Theme", the main theme of Mother 3, was composed late in the game's development; earlier in development Itoi intended to use the "Pigmask Army" theme as the main theme of the game. During the creation of an important scene in the game, however, Sakai was asked to create a song that would have a greater impact than the Pigmask theme; upon its creation, it was chosen to be used as the main theme instead of the "Pigmask Army" song. Itoi claims that, given how quickly Sakai composed the song, that he had been "waiting for the order" to make a song like "Love Theme". Itoi requested that "Love Theme" be playable on a piano with only one finger, as the "Eight Melodies" theme from Mother had gained popularity and been played in elementary schools due to its simplicity. The "OK desu ka?" that plays after the player chooses the character's name was recorded without Itoi's knowledge by Hirokazu Tanaka more than a decade before the release of Mother 3.

== Release ==
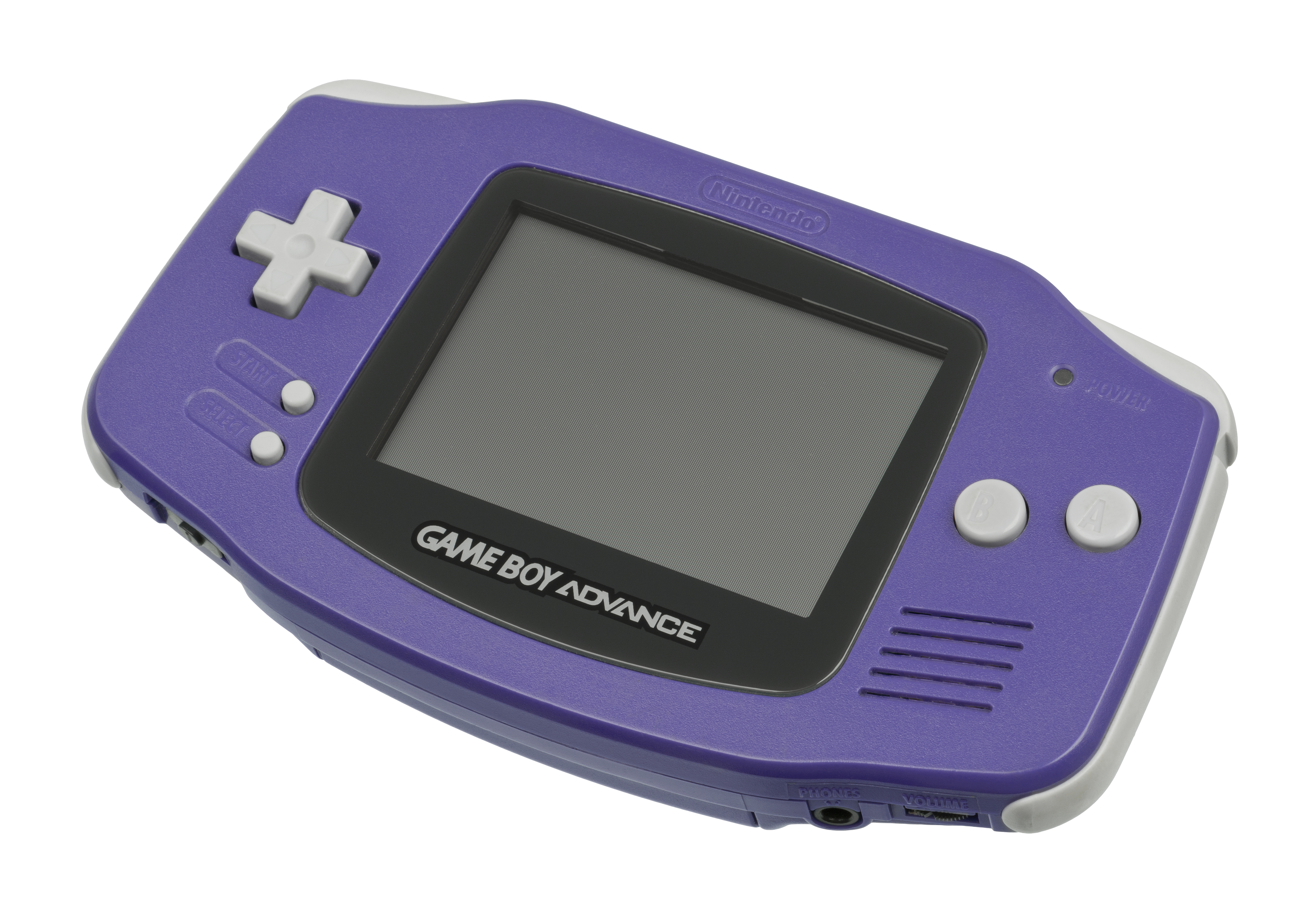
Mother 3's development spanned four consoles. The game was eventually released for the handheld Game Boy Advance.

Mother 3 was released in Japan on April 20, 2006, where it became a bestseller. Prior to its release, the game was in the "top five most wanted games" of Famitsu and at the top of the Japanese preordered game charts. At one point leading up to its release, the game's "Love Theme" would play as music on hold for residents who made phonecalls to the Japan Post. A limited edition Deluxe Box Set was produced with a special edition Game Boy Micro and Franklin Badge pin. The game was marketed in Japan with a television commercial that has Japanese actress Kō Shibasaki on the verge of tears as she explains her feelings about Mother 3. Itoi has said that her performance was unscripted. The game was released for the Japanese Virtual Console on the Wii U in December 2015. Game Informer editor Imran Khan alleges that Nintendo planned an English localization but canceled it due to fears that the central theme of bereavement, as well as instances of drug use and animal cruelty, would generate controversy. Former Nintendo of America president Reggie Fils-Aimé later said in an interview with Bloomberg News that the lack of localization was because it "just didn't make business sense" to make one for a game released very late in the handheld's lifespan. He also said that he was in talks with Iwata to possibly release it on the North American Wii U eShop prior to Iwata's death. The game was re-released in Japan via the Nintendo Classics service on February 21, 2024.

=== Fan translation ===
Mother 3 did not receive an official release outside Japan. On October 17, 2008, Starmen.net released a fan translation patch that, when applied on a copy of the Mother 3 ROM image, converts all the game's text into English. Reid Young, co-founder of Starmen.net, said that when they realized Nintendo was not going to localize Mother 3, they decided to undertake the task, for themselves and for fans of the game. The translation team consisted of around a dozen individuals, including project lead Clyde "Tomato" Mandelin, a professional Japanese-to-English translator. The project took two years and thousands of work-hours to complete; it was estimated that the theoretical freelance cost of the translation was $30,000.

The project included translating, writing, and revising about 1,000 pages of the game script in addition to extensive ROM hacking and testing to ensure that the game properly displays the translated text. The translation included minor deviations from the original, such as localization of place names and puns. The few dramatic changes included renaming some characters and locations. For example, the character "Yokuba", loosely derived from yokubō (欲望; "greed"), was renamed "Fassad", derived from the Arabic word fasād (فساد, "corruption"), and incidentally, the French word façade. The ROM hacking entailed assembly-level changes to the game code to support features such as variable width fonts.

The team reported that "the highest levels" of Nintendo of America knew about their project, though they did not intervene. The localization team planned to end the project if Nintendo were to make an announcement about the future of the game, or if they were asked to cease development of the translation. They acknowledged that the legality of the localization was unclear since the final translation required use of an emulator or a flash cartridge. The localization patch was downloaded over 100,000 times in the first week following its release. Along with the translation, the team announced the Mother 3 Handbook, an English player's guide for the game that had been in development since June 2008. Wired reported the full-color, 200-page player's guide to be akin to a professional strategy guide, with quality "on par with ... Prima Games and BradyGames". The Verge cited the two-year fan translation of Mother 3 as proof of the fan base's dedication, and Jenni Lada of TechnologyTell called it "undoubtedly one of the best known fan translations in existence", with active retranslations into other languages, such as Catalan, Chinese, Dutch, French, German, Italian, Korean, Polish, Brazilian Portuguese, Russian, and European Spanish.

== Reception ==
Reception

Aggregate score
Aggregator	Score
GameRankings	83.50%

Review scores
Publication	Score
Eurogamer	7/10
Famitsu	35/40
NGC Magazine	77/100
RPGamer	4/5

Mother 3 received critical acclaim. It sold around 200,000 copies in its first week of sales in Japan and despite not having an English localization, critics imported it for reception and gave it mostly positive reviews. It was one of Japan's top 20 bestselling games for the first half of 2006, and received a "Platinum Hall of Fame" score of 35/40 from Japanese reviewer Weekly Famitsu. It ended the year with over 368,000 copies sold, the 36th highest of the year in Japan. Jenni Lada of TechnologyTell called it the "perfect" Game Boy Advance role-playing game. Reviewers praised its story (even though the game was only available in Japanese) and graphics, and lamented its 1990s role-playing game mechanics. Critics also complimented its music.

Famitsu's reviewers noted the level of detail from the game's direction, accessibility and wit of the story, unconventional art style, and conventional game mechanics. They considered the timed battles to be both useful and difficult. Eurogamer's Simon Parkin detailed the 12-year development, the series' legacy as both "one of Japan's most beloved" and the video game cognoscenti's "sacred cow", and the endurance of its fan community. He was impressed by the quality of the fan translation and described Itoi as a "storyteller" who chose the Japanese role-playing game medium to tell his story. Parkin noted how the "excellent" script unfurled from a "straightforward tale" into "breadth and depth of quality that few titles many times its budget achieve" with "affecting scenes" and "unexpected impact". He compared the chapter approach with the method of Dragon Quest IV. Parkin wrote that the script allowed for the somewhat "heavy-handed" juxtaposition of "nature and technology, feudalism and capitalism, individuals and community", and that what he first considers a name customization "trick" becomes useful later in the game. NGC Magazine's Mark Green wrote that the game felt like Mother 2.5 in its look and feel, which he did not consider negative, albeit somewhat antiquated. Lada of TechnologyTell said Mother 3 was surprisingly "darker" than its forebears.

Few pregnancies have been as painful and protracted as Mother 3's.

— Simon Parkin of Eurogamer, Mother 3 review, 2008

Eurogamer's Parkin wrote that the "childlike" and "unusually Western" graphics were similar to EarthBound's in "flat pastel textures devoid of shading" as juxtaposed with background art that "fizzes with life and character". He described the cutscenes' animations as "bespoke", rare for 16-bit role-playing games, and of greater dramatic impact. RPGamer's Jordan Jackson wrote that the visuals are typical of the series and fit the game's mood, and the website's Mike Moehnke criticized the inventory limits carried over from the previous game. Green of NGC said the game mechanics were "depressingly basic" against more advanced role-playing games. Eurogamer's Parkin felt that the role-playing game elements were less interesting and added that Mother 3 had few standout selling points other than its attention to detail and "only systemic innovation": the rhythm-based battle system. Kotaku's Richard Eisenbeis praised the system, and GameSpot's Greg Kasavin compared it with that of the Mario & Luigi series. Jackson wrote that the music was "just as catchy as previous games" despite being "almost completely new". Moehnke agreed, calling it "nothing less than stunning". He noted overtones of Wagner and Chuck Berry. Jackson said that the game was somewhat easier than the rest of the series and somewhat shorter, at about 30 hours in length. Both RPGamer reviewers noted that Mother 3 has few penalties for death. Jackson reflected that while the game is humorous and grows in enjoyment, it has some somber moments as well. Eisenbeis of Kotaku cited "the importance of mothers" as a key theme about which the game revolves, which he preferred to the mid-game "slapstick insanity" and final plot twist. Parkin wrote that the game was filled with "memorable moments", including a character who criticizes the player "for not giggling at puns", frogs with progressively silly costumes that save the game, a "reconstructed mecha caribou" battle, a bad haiku, and the "campfire scene", and that while the game's simpleness could have leaned towards "raw stupidity", instead it was "elegant in its simplicity".

== Legacy ==
Multiple critics wrote that Mother 3 was one of the best role-playing games for the Game Boy Advance. GamePro's Jeremy Signor listed it among his "best unreleased Japanese role-playing games" for its script and attention to detail. Tim Rogers posited that Mother 3 was "the closest games have yet come to literature."

Nintendo has been heavily criticized for Mother 3's lack of an international release. IGN referred to the Mother series as "neglected" in regards to EarthBound being the only game to be released outside Japan for decades until 2015, with Mother being localized as EarthBound Beginnings globally for Nintendo Virtual Console, 26 years after the original game's release on the Famicom in 1989. Bob Mackey of 1UP.com wrote of Mother 3 that no other game in the history of time garnered such demand for translation, and Chris Plante of UGO Networks wrote that the lack of an official Mother 3 English localization was one of 2008's "worst heartbreaks". Frank Caron of Ars Technica said that the fan translation's "massive undertaking ... stands as a massive success" and that "one cannot even begin to fathom why Nintendo wouldn't see fit to release the game in the West".

Although acclaimed, Mother series writer and creator Shigesato Itoi has stated that he does not have any plans to create a fourth installment in the series.

The Super Smash Bros. series features Lucas as a playable fighter, as well as minor characters as collectibles, items, or stage hazards.

On April 30, 2021, American actor Terry Crews posted a viral tweet which read "LOCALIZE MOTHER 3!".

During Nintendo's digital event at E3 2014, Nintendo made a humorous reference to Mother 3's lack of a localization by presenting a stop-motion animation created by Robot Chicken. The short features a fan in attendance talking to then-Nintendo of America President Reggie Fils-Aimé. After the fan says "Come on, Reggie, give us Mother 3!", Fils-Aimé responds by saying "How about this instead?" and then proceeds to eat a Fire Flower from the Super Mario series in order to throw a fireball at the fan.
