= Mother (video game series) =

Video game series

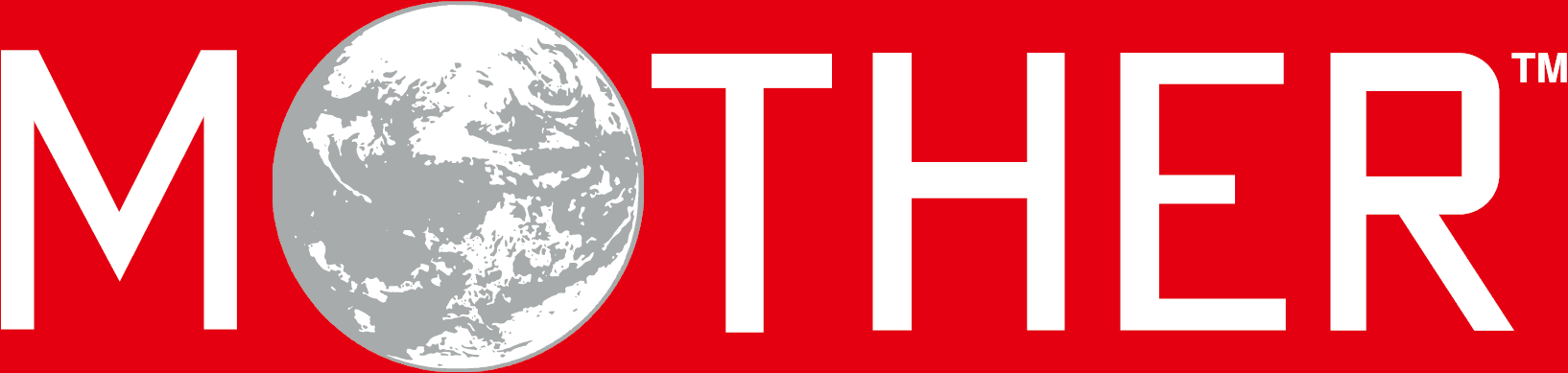
- Genre: Role-playing
- Developers: Ape; HAL Laboratory; Brownie Brown
- Publisher: Nintendo
- Creator: Shigesato Itoi
- Composers: Keiichi Suzuki; Hirokazu Tanaka; Shogo Sakai
- Platforms: Family Computer; Super Nintendo Entertainment System; Game Boy Advance
- First release: EarthBound Beginnings; July 27, 1989
- Latest release: Mother 3 April 20, 2006

Mother (Note: Japanese: マザー, Hepburn: Mazā) (known as EarthBound outside Japan) is a video game series that consists of three role-playing video games: Mother (1989), known as EarthBound Beginnings outside Japan, for the Family Computer; Mother 2 (1994), known as EarthBound outside Japan, for the Super Nintendo Entertainment System; and Mother 3 (2006) for the Game Boy Advance.

Written by Shigesato Itoi, published by Nintendo, and featuring game mechanics modeled on the Dragon Quest series, Mother is known for its sense of humor, originality, and parody. The player uses weapons and psychic powers to fight hostile enemies, which include animated everyday objects, aliens and brainwashed people. Signature elements of the series include a lighthearted approach to the plot, battle sequences with psychedelic backgrounds, and the "rolling HP meter": player health ticks down like an odometer rather than instantly being subtracted, allowing the player to take preventative action, such as healing or finishing the battle, before the damage is fully dealt. While the franchise is popular in Japan, in the Anglosphere it is best associated with the cult following behind EarthBound.

While visiting Nintendo for other business, Itoi approached Shigeru Miyamoto about making Mother. When approved for a sequel, Itoi increased his involvement in the design process over the five-year development of EarthBound. When the project began to flounder, producer and later Nintendo president Satoru Iwata rescued the game. EarthBound's English localizers were given great liberties when translating the Japanese game's cultural allusions. The American version sold poorly despite a multimillion-dollar marketing budget. Mother 3 was originally slated for release on the Nintendo 64 and its 64DD disk drive accessory as EarthBound 64, but was cancelled in 2000. Three years later, the project was reannounced for the Game Boy Advance alongside a rerelease of Mother and Mother 2 in the combined cartridge Mother 1 + 2. Mother 3 abandoned the 3D graphics progress for a 2D style, and became a bestseller upon its release. EarthBound was rereleased for the Wii U Virtual Console in 2013, and Mother received its English-language debut for the same platform in 2015, retitled EarthBound Beginnings. In 2022, Nintendo released Mother 1 and 2 to their Nintendo Switch Online service. Mother 3 later came to the service exclusively in Japan in 2024.

EarthBound is widely regarded as a video game classic, and is included in multiple top-ten lists. In absence of continued official support for the series, members of the EarthBound fan community organized online to advocate for further series releases through petitions and fan art. Their projects include a full fan translation of Mother 3, a full-length documentary, and fangame attempts. Ness, the protagonist of EarthBound and Lucas, the protagonist of Mother 3, received exposure from their inclusion in the Super Smash Bros. series. Other Mother series locations and characters have made appearances in the fighting games.

== Gameplay ==
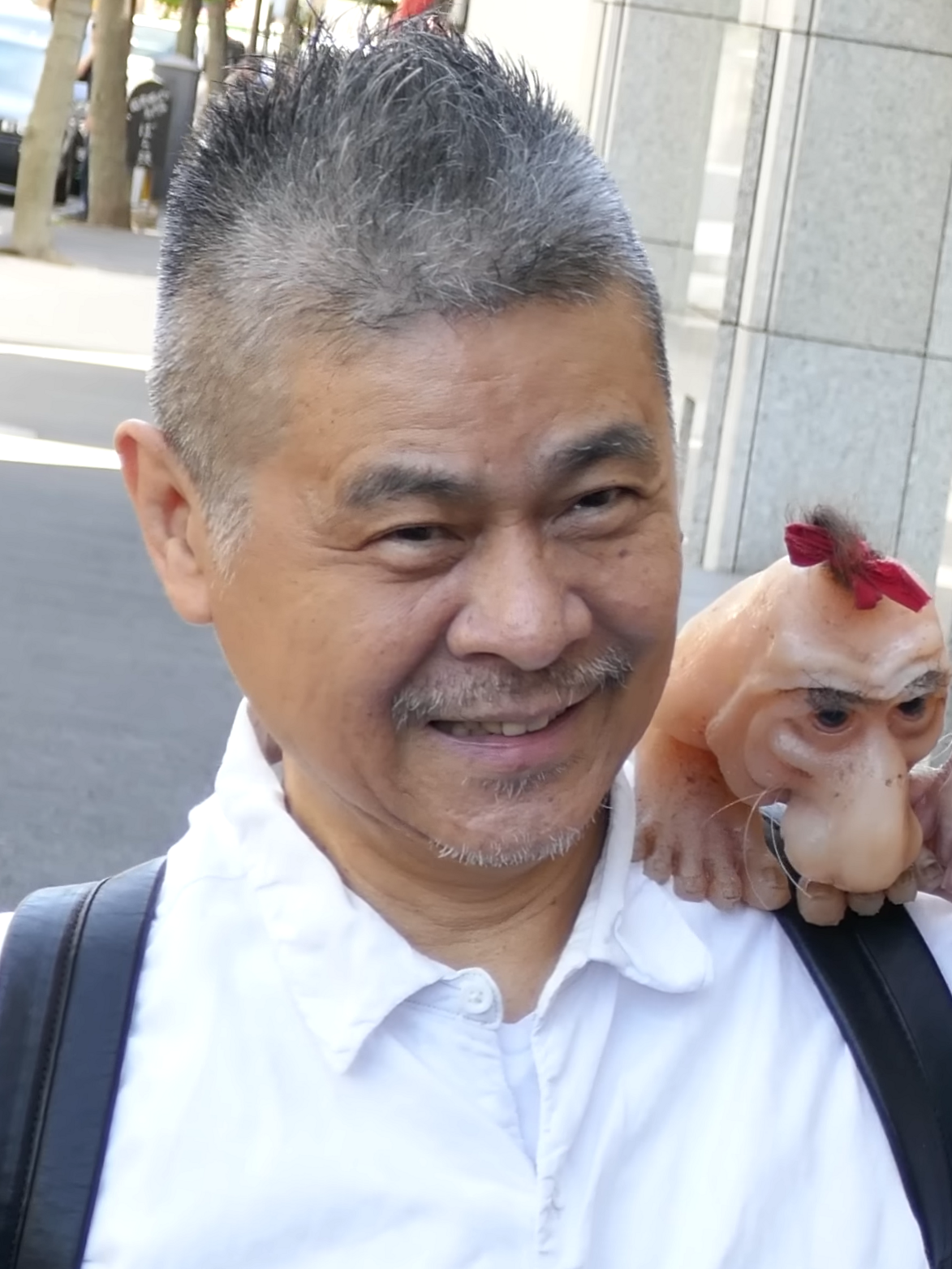
Creator Shigesato Itoi, pictured in 2016 along with a "realistic" figure of the Mr. Saturn character

The series is known for its combination of humorous and emotionally evocative tones. Itoi wanted to tell Mother 3 through a technique that swapped the active player-character, which he first attempted in EarthBound. The two games also share similar visual styles, both with psychedelic battle backgrounds and cartoonish art. While Mother 3's music is both similar in tone to its predecessors and completely new, it features similar sound effects. EarthBound characters such as Mr. Saturn recur, and RPGamer wrote that Mother 3's final chapter is "full of blatant links" between the games of the series. Mother also shares similarities with its sequel, such as the game save option through phoning Ninten's father, an option to store items with Ninten's sister at home, and an automated teller machine for banking money. Additionally, the members of the party follow behind the protagonist on the overworld screen in the first two games. Ninten's party members in Mother are analogous to those of EarthBound in style and function.

While Mother's battles were triggered through random encounters, EarthBound and early Mother 3 shared battle scene triggers, where physical contact with an enemy in the overworld began a turn-based battle scene shown in the first-person. Apart from Mother 3's rhythm and combo battle mechanic, the two game's battle systems are similar. Mother 3 also retains the "rolling HP meter" of EarthBound (where health ticks down like an odometer such that players can outrun the meter to heal before dying/fainting) but removes the feature where experience is automatically awarded before battles against much weaker foes. Recurring through the series is its signature "SMAAAASH" text and sound, which show when the player registers a critical hit.

Some characters are present in multiple entries of the series, such as Giygas, Mr. Saturn, and Pokey/Porky. Giygas is the primary antagonist in both Mother and EarthBound. The alien creature's emotional complexity deviates from genre norms. Giygas shows internal conflict in Mother and has no appearance but as an "indescribable" force in EarthBound's final boss battle. In both final battles, Giygas is defeated through love and prayer instead of through a tour de force of weaponry, unlike the endings of other period games. Nadia Oxford wrote for IGN that nearly two decades later, EarthBound's final fight against Giygas continues to be "one of the most epic video game standoffs of all time" with noted emotional impact. This battle's dialogue was based on Itoi's recollections of a traumatic scene from the Shintoho film The Military Policeman and the Dismembered Beauty that he had accidentally seen in his childhood. Oxford wrote for 1UP.com that Itoi intended to show the alien's yearning for love in "a manner ... beyond human understanding".

Despite EarthBound and Mother 3's dissimilar settings, the Mr. Saturn fictional species appear in similar Saturn Valleys in both games. The Mr. Saturn look like an old man's head with feet, a large nose, and bald except for a single hair with a bow. Though they are a technologically advanced and peaceful species with a pureness of heart, they are under constant attacks from encroaching enemies. Nadia and David Oxford of 1UP.com considered the Mr. Saturn to be aliens despite their human-like and fleshy appearance, as described a piece arguing the central theme of aliens in the Mother series. They compared the Mr. Saturn to Kurt Vonnegut's Tralfamadorian alien species. Finally, Pokey begins as Ness's child neighbor who "cowers" and "refuses to fight" in EarthBound, but grows into a "vicious control freak with no regard for human life", Porky, by the end of the series' Mother 3.

=== Music ===
The soundtracks for Mother and EarthBound were composed by Keiichi Suzuki and Hirokazu Tanaka. The Mother soundtrack was likened by RPGFan reviewer Patrick Gann to compositions by the Beatles and for children's television shows. He found the lyrics "cheesy and trite" but appreciated the "simple statements" in "Eight Melodies" and the "quirky and wonderful" "Magicant". The Mother soundtrack contains several tracks later used in subsequent series games. When Suzuki and Tanaka were unavailable to commit to Mother 3's soundtrack, Itoi chose Shogo Sakai for his experience with and understanding of the series. Sakai worked to make the music feel similar to previous entries in the series. Kyle Miller of RPGFan wrote that the game retained the quirkiness of the previous soundtracks in the series despite the change in composers. He felt that the second half of the album, which included reinterpreted "classics" from the series, to be its strongest. RPGamer's Jordan Jackson too found that the music was "just as catchy as previous games" despite being "almost completely new". Luke Plunkett of Kotaku credited Suzuki's background outside of games composition as a rock star and film scorer for making the music of Mother and EarthBound "so distinct and memorable" as "a synthesized tribute to 20th-century pop music".

== Development ==
Release timeline
1989	Mother
1990–1993
1994	Mother 2
1995	EarthBound
1996–2002
2003	Mother 1 + 2
2004–2005
2006	Mother 3
2007–2014
2015	EarthBound Beginnings

=== EarthBound Beginnings ===
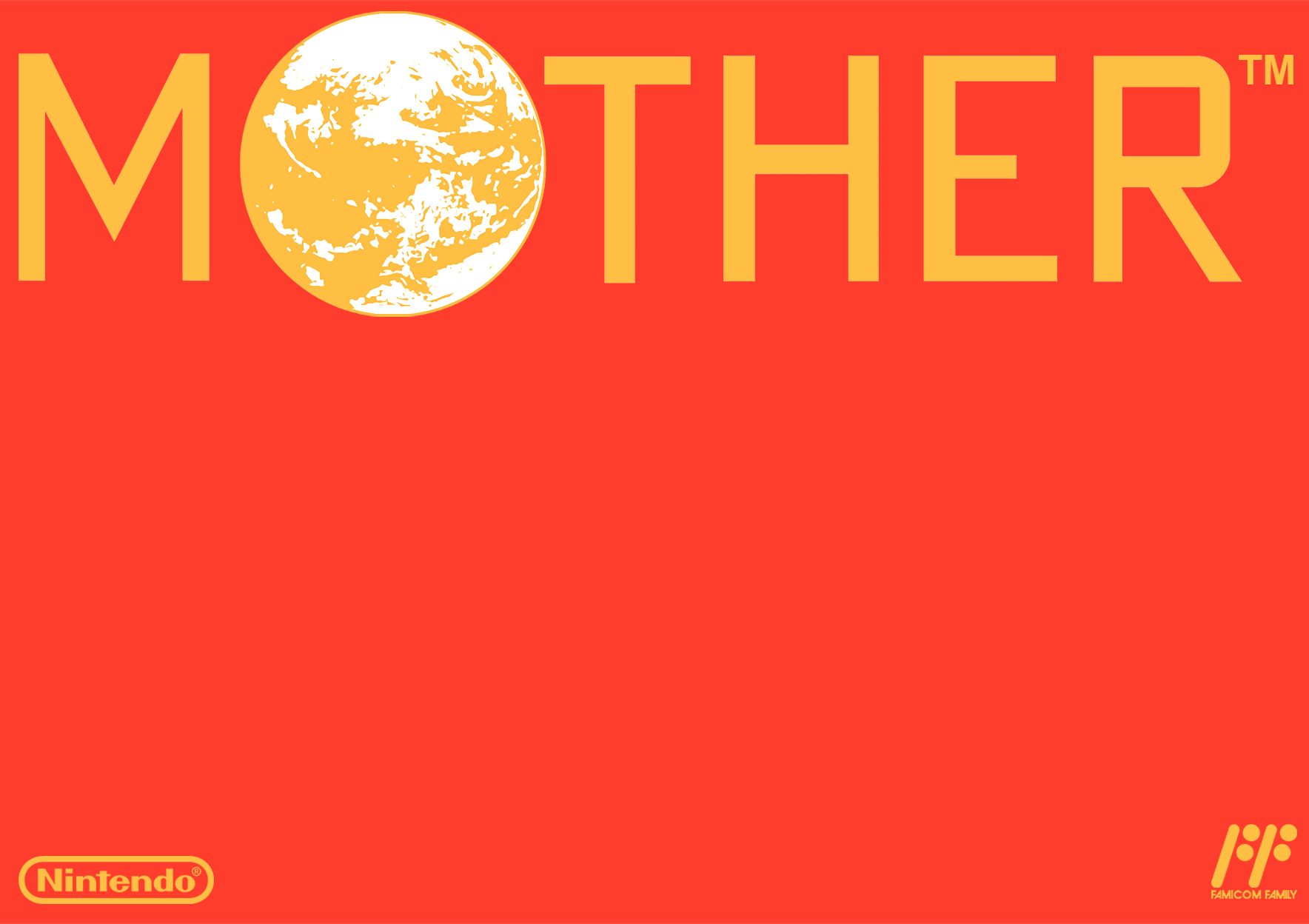
The box artwork for Mother

While visiting Nintendo for other work, celebrity copywriter Shigesato Itoi pitched to the company's lead designer, Shigeru Miyamoto, his idea for a role-playing game set in modern times. The contemporary setting worked against role-playing genre norms, and while Miyamoto liked the idea, he was hesitant until Itoi could show full commitment to the project. Itoi reduced his workload, formed a team, and began development in Ichikawa, Chiba. Nintendo tried to accommodate Itoi's ideal work environment to feel more like an extracurricular club of volunteers. Itoi wrote the game's script. The game, titled Mother, was developed by Ape, published by Nintendo, and released in Japan on July 27, 1989, for the Famicom (known as the Nintendo Entertainment System outside Japan). The game was slated for an English-language localization as Earth Bound, but was abandoned when Nintendo chose to focus on the Super Nintendo Entertainment System instead. Years later, the complete localization was recovered by the public and distributed on the Internet, where it became known as EarthBound Zero. Mother received its English language debut in June 2015 as EarthBound Beginnings for the Wii U Virtual Console.

Mother is a single-player role-playing video game set in a "slightly offbeat", late 20th-century United States (as interpreted by Itoi). Unlike its Japanese role-playing game contemporaries, Mother is not set in a fantasy genre. The player fights in warehouses and laboratories instead of in dungeons and similar fantasy settings, and battles are fought with baseball bats and psychic abilities instead of swords and magic. Mother follows the young Ninten as he uses psychic powers to fight hostile, formerly inanimate objects and other enemies. The game uses random encounters to enter a menu-based, first-person perspective battle system.

=== EarthBound ===
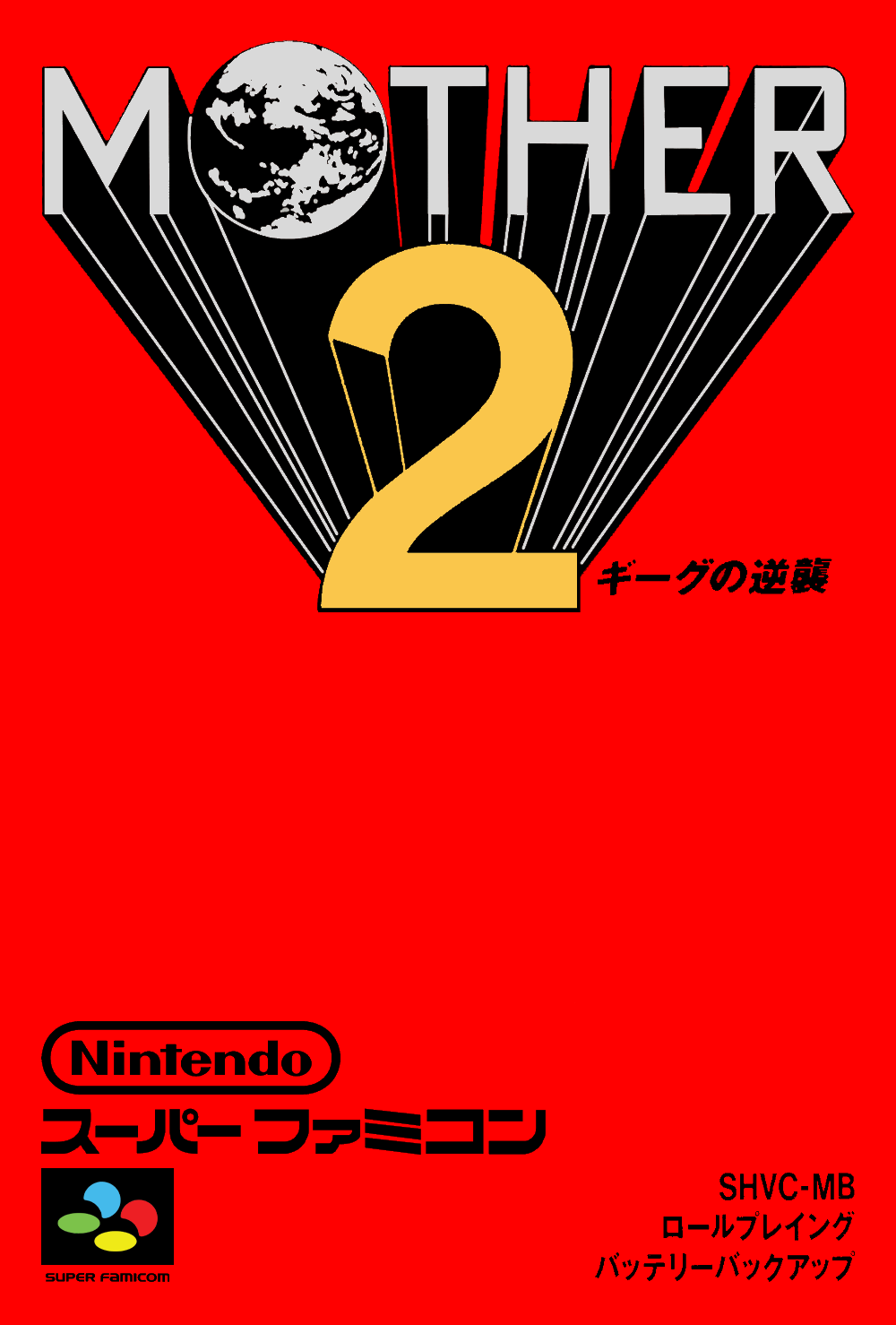
The cover art of Mother 2, released internationally as EarthBound

Mother 2 was made with a development team different from that of the original game, and most of its members were unmarried and willing to work through nights on the project. Itoi again wrote the game's script and served as a designer. The game's five-year development exceeded time estimates and came under repeated threat of cancellation. It was in dire straits until producer Satoru Iwata joined the team. (Note: Iwata later became Nintendo's president and CEO.) Mother 2 was developed by Ape and HAL, published by Nintendo, and released in Japan's Super Famicom on August 27, 1994. The game was translated into English for North American audiences whereupon it became the only Mother series game to be released in North America until the later localization of Mother as EarthBound Beginnings. The localizers were given liberties to translate the Japanese script's cultural allusions to Western audiences as they pleased, and symbolism was also modified between the versions to adapt to Western sensitivities. To avoid confusion about the series' numbering, its English title was changed to EarthBound, and was released on June 5, 1995, for the North American Super Nintendo Entertainment System.

Although Nintendo spent about $2 million on marketing, the American release was ultimately viewed as unsuccessful within Nintendo. EarthBound was released when role-playing games were not popular in the United States, and visual taste in role-playing games was closer to Chrono Trigger and Final Fantasy VI. EarthBound's atypical "this game stinks" marketing campaign was derived from the game's unusual humor and included foul-smelling scratch and sniff advertisements. 1UP.com called the campaign "infamously ill-conceived". Between the poor sales and the dwindling support for the Super NES, the game did not receive a European release.

The Mother series titles are built on what Itoi considered "reckless wildness", where he would offer ideas that encouraged his staff to contribute new ways of portraying scenes in the video game medium. He saw the titles foremost as games and not "big scenario scripts". Itoi has said that he wanted the player feel emotions such as "distraught" when playing the game. The game's writing was intentionally "quirky and goofy" in character, and written in the Japanese kana script so as to give dialogue a conversational feel. Itoi thought of the default player-character names when he did not like his team's suggestions. Many of the characters were based on real-life personalities. Itoi sought to make the game appeal to populations that played games less, such as girls.

Earthbound's story is a continuation of Mother's, featuring many of the same antagonists and monsters. By default, the player starts as a young boy named Ness, who finds that the alien force Giygas (/ˈɡiːɡəs, ˈɡaɪɡəs/ GHEE-gəs, GHY-gəs) has enveloped the world in hatred and consequently turned animals, humans, and objects into malicious creatures. Buzz Buzz, a bee from the future, instructs Ness to collect melodies in a Sound Stone to preemptively stop the force. While visiting the eight Sanctuaries where the melodies are held, Ness meets three other kids named Paula, Jeff, and Poo—"a psychic girl, an eccentric inventor, and a ponytailed martial artist", respectively—who join his party. Along the way, Ness encounters the cultists of Happy Happy Village, the zombie-infested Threed, the Winters boarding school, and the kingdom of Dalaam. When the Sound Stone is filled, Ness visits Magicant alone, a surreal location in his mind where he fights his dark side. Upon returning to Eagleland, he prepares to travel back in time to fight Giygas in a battle known for its "feeling of isolation, ... incomprehensible attacks, ... buzzing static" and reliance on prayer.

EarthBound plays as a Japanese role-playing game modeled on Dragon Quest. The game is characterized by its contemporary, satirical Western world setting and its unconventional characters, enemies, and humor. Examples of the game's humor include untraditional enemies such as "New Age Retro Hippie" and "Unassuming Local Guy", snide dialogue, frequent puns, and fourth wall-breaking. The game also plays self-aware pranks on the player, such as the existence of the useless ruler and protractor items that players and enemies can unsuccessfully try to use nonetheless.

=== Mother 3 ===
In 1996, Mother 3 (EarthBound 64 in North America), was announced. It was slated for release on the 64DD, a disk drive expansion peripheral for the Nintendo 64. Itoi's expansive ideas during development led the development team to question whether fans would still consider the game part of the series. The game entered development hell and struggled to find a firm release date and in 2000, despite its level of completion, was later cancelled altogether with the commercial failure of the 64DD.

The project was reannounced three years later as Mother 3 for the Game Boy Advance alongside a combined Mother 1 + 2 cartridge for the same handheld console. Itoi had been working on porting Mother and Mother 2 to the Game Boy Advance, and based on encouragement what he predicted to be further pressure, decided to release Mother 3. The new Mother 3 abandoned the Nintendo 64 version's 3D graphics, but kept its plot. The game was developed by Brownie Brown and HAL Laboratory, published by Nintendo, and released in Japan on April 20, 2006, whereupon it became a bestseller. It did not receive a North American release on the basis that it would not sell.

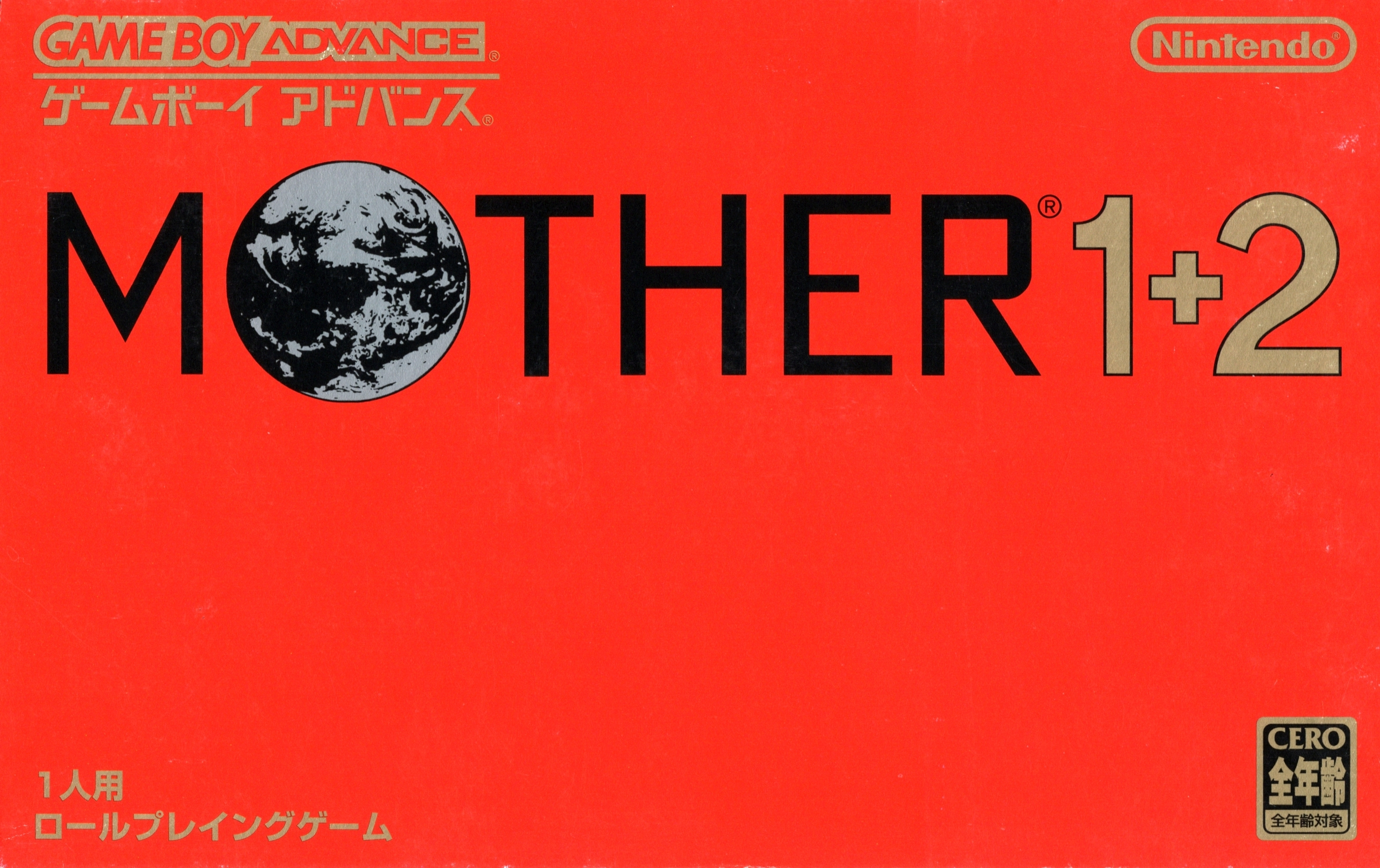
Cover art of Mother 1 + 2

Mother 1 + 2 was released in Japan on June 20, 2003. The combined cartridge contains both Mother and Mother 2. Mother uses the extended ending of the unreleased English language prototype, but is still only presented in Japanese.

Unlike earlier games in the series, Mother 3 is presented in chapters. When the Pig Mask Army starts a forest fire and imposes police state-like conditions on a "pastoral forest village", a father, Flint, ventures out to protect his family (twin sons Lucas and Claus and wife Hinawa), but the rest of the world is eventually implicated in the plot. Lucas, the game's hero, does not become prominent until the fourth chapter. Along with his dog, a neophyte thief, and a princess, Lucas fulfills a prophecy of a "chosen one" pulling Needles from the Earth to wake a sleeping dragon and determine the fate of the world. The game features a lighthearted plot, with characters such as "partying ghosts" and "talking rope snakes".

Mother 3, much like its predecessors, is a single-player role-playing video game played with two buttons: one for starting conversations and checking adjacent objects, and another for running. The game updates the turn-based Dragon Quest-style battle system with a "rhythm-action mechanic", which lets the player take additional turns to attack the enemy by chaining together up to sixteen taps in time with the background music. Apart from this, the battle system and "rolling HP meter" (where health ticks down like an odometer such that players can outrun the meter to heal before dying) are similar to EarthBound.

=== Future of the series ===
Around Mother 3's 2006 release, Itoi stated that he had no plans to make Mother 4, which he has reaffirmed repeatedly. Itoi has said that, of the three, he had the strongest drive to create the first Mother video game, and that it was made for the players. He made the second game as an exploration of his personal interests, and wanted to run wild with the third. While reflecting on Mother 3's 2000 cancellation, Itoi recounted the great efforts the team made to tell small parts of the story, and felt this was a core theme in the series' development.

In the absence of continued support for the series, an EarthBound fan community coalesced at Starmen.net with the intent to have Nintendo of America acknowledge their interest in Mother series. They drafted petitions for English language releases and created a full-color, 270-page anthology of fan art. Upon "little" response from Nintendo, they localized Mother 3 by themselves and printed a "professional quality strategy guide" through Fangamer, a video game merchandising site that spun off from Starmen.net. The Verge cited the effort as proof of the fan base's dedication. Other fan efforts include EarthBound, USA, a full-length documentary on Starmen.net and the fan community, and Oddity (previously titled Mother 4), a game that was initially developed as a fan-produced sequel to the Mother series that went into production when Itoi definitively "declared" that he was done with the series.

IGN described the series as neglected by Nintendo in North America, as Mother 1, Mother 1+2, and Mother 3 were not released outside Japan. Despite this, Ness's recurrence in the Super Smash Bros. series signaled favorable odds for the future of the Mother series. IGN and Nintendo Power readers anticipated a rerelease of EarthBound on the Wii's Virtual Console upon its launch in 2006, but it did not materialize. A Japanese rerelease was announced in 2013 for the Wii U Virtual Console as part of a celebration of the anniversaries of the NES and Mother 2. North American and European releases for the same platform followed, with Nintendo president Satoru Iwata crediting fan interest on the company's Miiverse social platform. The game was a "top-seller" on the Wii U Virtual Console, and Kotaku users and first-time EarthBound players had an "overwhelmingly positive" response to the game. Simon Parkin wrote that the game's rerelease was a "momentous occasion" as the return of "one of Nintendo's few remaining lost classics" after 20 years. In an interview in late November 2015, Shigesato Itoi has once again denied plans to create a Mother 4, despite fan feedback. American developer Toby Fox considered pitching to Itoi that he could help him make a fourth game in the Mother franchise, but changed his mind after Itoi encouraged Fox to make a sequel to Undertale which would later release as Deltarune.

== Reception ==
In 1001 Video Games You Must Play Before You Die, Christian Donlan wrote that the Mother series is a "massive RPG franchise" in Japan comparable to that of Final Fantasy and Dragon Quest, though it does not enjoy the same popularity in the West. IGN described the series as neglected by Nintendo in North America, which only received one of the three Mother releases. Donlan added that the series' oddities did not lend towards Western popularity. RPGamer's Jordan Jackson noted that the series is "known for its wacky sense of humor, originality, and its very young protagonists", and Kotaku's Luke Plunkett said that the games were distinct from all other video games in that they stirred "genuine emotion in players beyond ... 'excited' and 'afraid'" with a "charming", "touching", and "tragic" story, which he credited to its creators' pedigrees from outside the video game industry.

Mother was the sixth best-selling game of 1989 in Japan, where it sold about 400,000 copies. It received a "Silver Hall of Fame" score of 31/40 from Japanese magazine Famitsu. Critics noted the game's similarities with the Dragon Quest series and its simultaneous "parody" of the genre's tropes. They thought the game's sequel, EarthBound, to be very similar and a better implementation of Mother's gameplay ideas, overall. Reviewers also noted the game's high difficulty level and balance issues. USgamer's Jeremy Parish said that Mother's script was "as sharp as EarthBound's", but felt that the original's game mechanics were subpar, lacking the "rolling HP counter" and non-random encounters for which later entries in the series were known. Parish wrote earlier for 1UP.com that in comparison to EarthBound, Mother is "worse in just about every way", and important less for its actual game and more for the interest it generated in video game emulation and the preservation of unreleased games.

EarthBound sold about 440,000 copies worldwide, with approximately 300,000 sold in Japan and about 140,000 in the United States. It originally received little critical praise from the American press, and sold poorly in the United States: around 140,000 copies, as compared to twice as many in Japan. Kotaku described EarthBound's 1995 American release as "a dud" and blamed the low sales on "a bizarre marketing campaign" and graphics "cartoonish" beyond the average taste of players. Multiple reviewers described the game as "original" or "unique" and praised its script's range of emotions, humor, cheery and charming ambiance, and "real world" setting, which was seen as an uncommon choice. Since its release, the game's English localization has found praise, and later reviewers reported that the game had aged well.

Prior to its release, Mother 3 was in the "top five most wanted games" of Famitsu and at the top of the Japanese preordered game charts. It sold around 200,000 units in its first week of sales in Japan, and was one of Japan's top 20 bestselling games for the first half of 2006. In comparison, the 2003 Mother 1 + 2 rerelease sold around 278,000 copies in Japan in its first year, and a reissue "value selection" of the cartridge sold 106,000 copies in Japan in 2006. Mother 3 received a "Platinum Hall of Fame" score of 35/40 from Famitsu. Reviewers praised its story (even though the game was only available in Japanese) and graphics, and lamented its 1990s role-playing game mechanics. Critics also complimented its music. Jackson said that the game was somewhat easier than the rest of the series and somewhat shorter in length.

== Legacy ==
The series has a legacy as both "one of Japan's most beloved" and the video game cognoscenti's "sacred cow", and is known for its long-lasting, resilient fan community. At one point leading up to Mother 3's release, the series' "Love Theme" played as music on hold for Japan Post. Similarly, the Eight Melodies theme used throughout the series has been incorporated into Japanese elementary school music classrooms. Donlan of 1001 Video Games You Must Play Before You Die wrote that EarthBound is "name-checked by the video gaming cognoscenti more often than it's actually been played".

Critics consider EarthBound a "classic" or "must-play" among video games. The game was included in multiple top 50 games of all time lists, including that of Famitsu readers in 2006 and IGN readers in 2005 and 2006. IGN ranks the game 13th in its top 100 SNES games and 26th among all games for its in-game world, which was "distinct and unforgettable" for its take on Americanism, unconventional settings, and 1960s music. And Gamasutra named it one of its 20 "essential" Japanese role-playing games. The rerelease was Justin Haywald of GameSpot's game of the year, and Nintendo Life's Virtual Console game of the year. GameZone said it "would be a great disservice" to merely call EarthBound "a gem". In the United Kingdom, where EarthBound had been previously unreleased, GamesTM noted how it had been "anecdotally heralded as a retro classic". IGN's Scott Thompson said the game was "the true definition of a classic". Kotaku wrote that the game was content to make the player "feel lonely", and, overall, was special not for any individual aspect but for its method of using the video game medium to explore ideas impossible to explore in other media.

Multiple critics wrote that Mother 3 was one of the best role-playing games for the Game Boy Advance. GamePro's Jeremy Signor listed it among his "best unreleased Japanese role-playing games" for its script and attention to detail. Video game journalist Tim Rogers posited that Mother 3 was "the closest games have yet come to literature". There are no plans for an official Mother 4.

The series, and specifically EarthBound, is known for having a cult following that developed over time well after its release. Colin Campbell of Polygon wrote that "few gaming communities are as passionate and active" as EarthBound's, and 1UP.com's Bob Mackey wrote that no game was as poised to have a cult following. Starmen.net hosted a Mother 25th Anniversary Fanfest in 2014 with a livestream of the game and plans for a remixed soundtrack. Later that year, fans released a 25th Anniversary Edition ROM hack that updated the game's graphics, script, and gameplay balance. The Verge cited the two-year-long Mother 3 fan translation as proof of the fan base's dedication, and Jenni Lada of TechnologyTell called it "undoubtably one of the best known fan translations in existence", with active retranslations into other languages. Frank Caron of Ars Technica said that the fan translation's "massive undertaking ... stands as a massive success", and that "one cannot even begin to fathom" why Nintendo would not release their own English localization.

=== Super Smash Bros. ===
EarthBound's Ness became widely known due to his later appearance in the Super Smash Bros. series. He appeared in the original Super Smash Bros. and its sequels: Melee, Brawl, 3DS/Wii U, and Ultimate. In Europe, which did not see an original EarthBound release, Ness is better known for his role in the fighting game than for his original role in the role-playing game. He returned in the 2001 Melee with EarthBound's Mr. Saturn, which could be thrown at enemies and otherwise pushes items off the battlefield. Melee has an unlockable Fourside level based on the EarthBound location.

When Melee was in development, Ness was not supposed to return as a playable character and would have been replaced by Lucas, the main character of Mother 3. However, Mother 3's original Nintendo 64 release was cancelled, though it was later successfully revived as a project for the Game Boy Advance. As a result, Ness was featured in Melee instead of Lucas.

Ness was later joined by Mother 3's Lucas in Brawl, (Note: Brawl also contains the final level from Mother 3 along with items and characters from the game, and a boss fight with the game's antagonist, Porky.) and both characters returned in 3DS/Wii U (Note: Lucas was initially excluded from the roster of 3DS/Wii U though later added as downloadable content.) and Ultimate. Players can fight in the 3DS's Magicant stage, which features clips from the Mother series in its background.
