= EarthBound Beginnings =

1989 video game

- Nintendo Classics official American box art
- Developers: Ape Inc. (Note: Additional work by Pax Softnica.); Nintendo Tokyo R&D Products
- Publisher: Nintendo
- Director: Shigesato Itoi
- Producer: Shigeru Miyamoto
- Designers: Shigesato Itoi; Miyuki Kure
- Programmers: Kazuya Nakatani; Takayuki Onodera; Motoo Yasuma
- Artists: Shinbo Minami; Tatsuya Ishii
- Writer: Shigesato Itoi
- Composers: Keiichi Suzuki; Hirokazu Tanaka
- Series: Mother
- Platforms: Family Computer; Game Boy Advance
- Release: JP: July 27, 1989; Mother 1+2: JP: June 20, 2003; Beginnings (Note: Wii U eShop and Nintendo Classics): NA: Jun 14, 2015; EU: Jun 15, 2015
- Genre: Role-playing
- Mode: Single-player

EarthBound Beginnings, originally released in Japan as Mother, (Note: Japanese: マザー, Hepburn: Mazā) is a 1989 role-playing video game developed by Ape Inc. and Nintendo and published by Nintendo for the Family Computer. It is the first entry in the Mother series and was first released in Japan on July 27, 1989. The game was re-released in Japan along with its sequel on the single-cartridge compilation Mother 1+2 for the Game Boy Advance in 2003. The game follows a young American boy named Ninten as he uses his great-grandfather's studies on psychic powers to put an end to the paranormal phenomena spiraling the country into disarray.

Writer and director Shigesato Itoi pitched Mother's concept to Shigeru Miyamoto while visiting Nintendo's headquarters for other business. Though Miyamoto rejected the proposal at first, he eventually gave Itoi a development team. Modeled after the gameplay of the Dragon Quest series, Mother subverted its fantasy genre contemporaries by being set in an offbeat parody of the late 20th-century United States. Itoi sought to incorporate standard RPG staples within the framework of a modern-day setting, parodying Western culture and Americana. As such, throughout the game, players use medication and hospitals to restore their health, utilize baseball bats and toy guns to fight enemies, and encounter aliens, robots, possessed objects, and brainwashed animals and humans. Mother uses random encounters to enter a menu-based, first-person perspective battle system.

Mother sold around 400,000 copies upon its release, where it was praised for its similarities to the Dragon Quest series and its simultaneous parody of the genre's tropes, though its high difficulty level and balance issues polarized critics. A North American localization of Mother was completed and slated for release as Earth Bound, but was abandoned as being commercially nonviable. A finished prototype was later found and publicly circulated on the Internet under the informal title EarthBound Zero. Though many critics considered Mother's sequel to be similar and an overall better implementation of its gameplay ideas, Jeremy Parish of 1UP.com wrote that Mother importantly generated interest in video game emulation and the historical preservation of unreleased games.

In 1994, Mother's sequel, Mother 2: Gīgu no Gyakushū, was released in Japan for the Super Famicom. The sequel was localized and released in America in 1995 under the name "EarthBound". EarthBound initially flopped in the U.S., but later gained a cult following. EarthBound was followed by the Japan-only sequel Mother 3 for the Game Boy Advance in 2006. To commemorate the 20th anniversary of EarthBound's U.S. release, Mother was released globally as EarthBound Beginnings for the Wii U Virtual Console in 2015, and was released alongside EarthBound for the Nintendo Classics service on Switch 1/2 in 2022.

== Gameplay ==
Screenshots from battle sequences in EarthBound Beginnings (left) and Dragon Quest III (right). The battle system of EarthBound Beginnings, including its interface and first-person perspective, drew inspiration from the Dragon Quest series.

EarthBound Beginnings is a single-player, role-playing video game set in a "slightly offbeat", late 20th-century United States as interpreted by Japanese author Shigesato Itoi. Throughout the game, the player fights hippies, undead zombies, animate objects and vehicles, extraterrestrial life, robots and mind-controlled humans and animals. The world is composed mainly of towns, deserts, swamps, forests, and caves the player must venture through. The game deliberately avoids traits of its Japanese role-playing game contemporaries: it does not strictly adhere to the fantasy or science fiction genres, despite numerous instances of each occurring within the game. The player fights in warehouses and laboratories instead of in standard dungeons, and rather than trekking from to each town on foot, the player is able to take trains to travel from area to area. Instead of swords, assault weapons, and magic, the player uses baseball bats, toy guns, frying pans, knives, and inherent psychic abilities. The game's main protagonists, Ninten, Lloyd, and Ana, are roughly 11–12 years of age. Lloyd and the game's fourth party member, Teddy, lack inherent psychic powers, unlike Ninten and Ana. The player can press a button to have Ninten "check" or "talk" with nearby people, animals, and objects. The game shares similarities with its sequel, EarthBound: there is a game save option through using a phone to call Ninten's father, an option to store items with one of Ninten's twin sisters at home, and an automated teller machine for banking money (ATM). The members of Ninten's party are all visible on the overworld screen at once, and are analogous to EarthBound's party members in style and function. Differing from the Final Fantasy and Dragon Quest series, Mother's world map does not keep locations separate, instead connecting all areas in one game world. The landscape's structures are portrayed with an oblique projection, requested by Itoi at a programmer's suggestion.

Like the Dragon Quest series, EarthBound Beginnings uses a random encounter combat system. The player explores the overworld from a top-down perspective and occasionally enters a first-person perspective battle sequence where the player chooses attack options from a series of menus. On their turn, the player selects between options to fight, guard, check enemy attributes, run away, use items, or use offensive, defensive, or healing psychic powers. The player can also set the battle on autopilot with the "auto" option. Upon being assigned a command, the party members attack in an order determined by a random number generator and the character's speed status. Critical hits register with the series' signature "SMAAAASH!!" text and sound. If the enemy or character's HP reaches 0, the battle is won and the opponent becomes unconscious; if a character or separate enemy becomes unconscious, it can only be reversed by using PSI on that character or enemy. If every character becomes unconscious, the game transitions to a blank screen, where it asks the player if they want to continue; an affirmative response brings Ninten, conscious, back to the last save point, with half the money on his person at the time of his defeat. Upon winning the battle, the player may receive experience points, new psychic powers, and other points to improve their overall status. Enough experience points will increase the character's level, which somewhat determines the increase of the character's physical and psychic points. There is also a chance an item can be obtained after an enemy is defeated. Once the battle is won, Ninten's father deposits money into an account, which can be withdrawn from an ATM. In towns, players can purchase weapons, items, and food from fast food restaurants and department stores. Weapons and equipment, such as pendants, medallions, and bracelets, can be equipped to increase a character's strength and defense. Items can be used for a multitude of purposes, such as healing, clearing obstacles, and unlocking doors. Towns also contain useful facilities such as hospitals, where players can be healed for a fee; in one town, it is half of whatever cash the player has on hand at that moment.

== Plot ==
In the early 1900s, a young married couple mysteriously vanish from their rural American town. Two years later, the husband, George, inexplicably returns and begins an odd study in complete seclusion. His wife, Maria, is never heard from again. In 1988, (Note: Changed to an ambiguous point in the 1980s in later releases.) the home of a young boy named Ninten (Note: Ninten originally went unnamed, being referenced to with standard pronouns such as "Boku" (ぼく), the Japanese form of "Me", but was officially designated as Ninten later on.) is attacked by a poltergeist. After Ninten fends it off, his father tells him that his great grandfather studied psychic powers, and asks him to investigate crises occurring across America. Starting off by resolving some in his hometown of Mother's Day, (Note: Podunk in later translations.) Ninten warps to the land of Magicant, where its monarch, Queen Mary, asks Ninten to collect the eight melodies of a song that appears in her dreams to play them for her. Ninten returns to Earth and befriends Lloyd, (Note: Also called Roid or Loid in other translations.) a child prodigy who is bullied at Tinkle Elementary School. (Note: Twinkle Elementary School in later versions.) The two travel to the town of Snowman to deliver a lost hat to Ana, (Note: Alternately Anna.) a young girl with psychic powers. Ana tells Ninten she saw him in a vision, and joins the party in hopes of finding her missing mother.

Ninten and his party exploring Valentine, a town where Teddy and his gang can be found

Finding the parts of Queen Mary's song, Ninten is harassed at a live house in the town of Valentine (Note: Ellay in later translations.) by a gang leader named Teddy. Surrendering after a fistfight, Teddy joins Ninten's party to avenge the death of his parents, who were killed by wild animals on Holy Loly Mountain; (Note: Mt. Itoi in later versions.) Teddy forces Lloyd to stay behind. In a cabin at the mountain's base, Ana pulls Ninten aside and asks him to stay with her forever. The two dance and profess their mutual love for each other. A giant robot (Note: An upgraded version of a robot the group faced earlier in the game.) then attacks the group, with Lloyd arriving in a tank to destroy the robot; the robot is defeated, but it's already too late; Ninten and Ana are burnt, and Teddy is critically wounded; allowing Lloyd to rejoin the party. They take a boat out on a nearby lake, and a whirlpool pulls them into an underwater laboratory. In it, they find a robot named EVE, who claims to have been built by George to protect Ninten. When the laboratory floods and they are sucked back out into the lake, they leave for the mountain's peak. After an even stronger robot shows up and attacks them, EVE self-destructs to destroy it, leaving behind the 7th melody of Queen Mary's song. The party is then warped to Magicant, where Ninten plays the complete song to Queen Mary on an ocarina. Maria recalls the final melody and tells Ninten the story of an alien named Gyiyg (Note: Giegue or Giygas in other translations.) that she had raised and had loved as her own child. Revealing that she is George's wife, Maria, Queen Mary vanishes; Magicant, actually a mirage created by her consciousness, vanishes with her. (Note: In later translations, Ninten first visits a grave at the top of Holy Loly Mountain, where George's spirit conjures a black crystal and speaks to Ninten through it, teaching him the final melody.)

The party is warped back to Holy Loly Mountain. The large rocks that had blocked the entrance to the mountain's peak were cleared by Maria's consciousness. There, the party encounters the mother ship that the fully-grown Gyiyg is on. The alien expresses his gratitude to Ninten's family for Maria having raising him, but explains that George had stolen information about his species' PSI abilities that could have been used to betray them, proceeding to accuse Ninten of interfering with their plans. Gyiyg offers to save Ninten alone if he boards the mother ship. The party then begins to sing Maria's lullaby while Gyiyg tries to quiet them through his attacks. They persist and finish the song, causing Gyiyg to be emotionally overwhelmed at the memory of Maria's motherly love. Gyiyg swears they will meet again and flies off in the mother ship. (Note: Later releases feature an extended ending, where human prisoners found earlier on Holy Loly Mountain are set free, including Ana's mother; Teddy recovers from his injuries and becomes a singer; Lloyd is treated like a hero among his classmates; and Ana is shown receiving a letter from Ninten. Ninten goes to bed as the cast of characters appear at the bottom of the screen before the credits. Afterward, Ninten's father tries to call his son to tell him of a new crisis occurring. The epilogue shown in the American version of the game was intended to be in the Japanese version as well but was not included due to time constraints. It would later be reimplemented in MOTHER 1+2.)

== Development ==
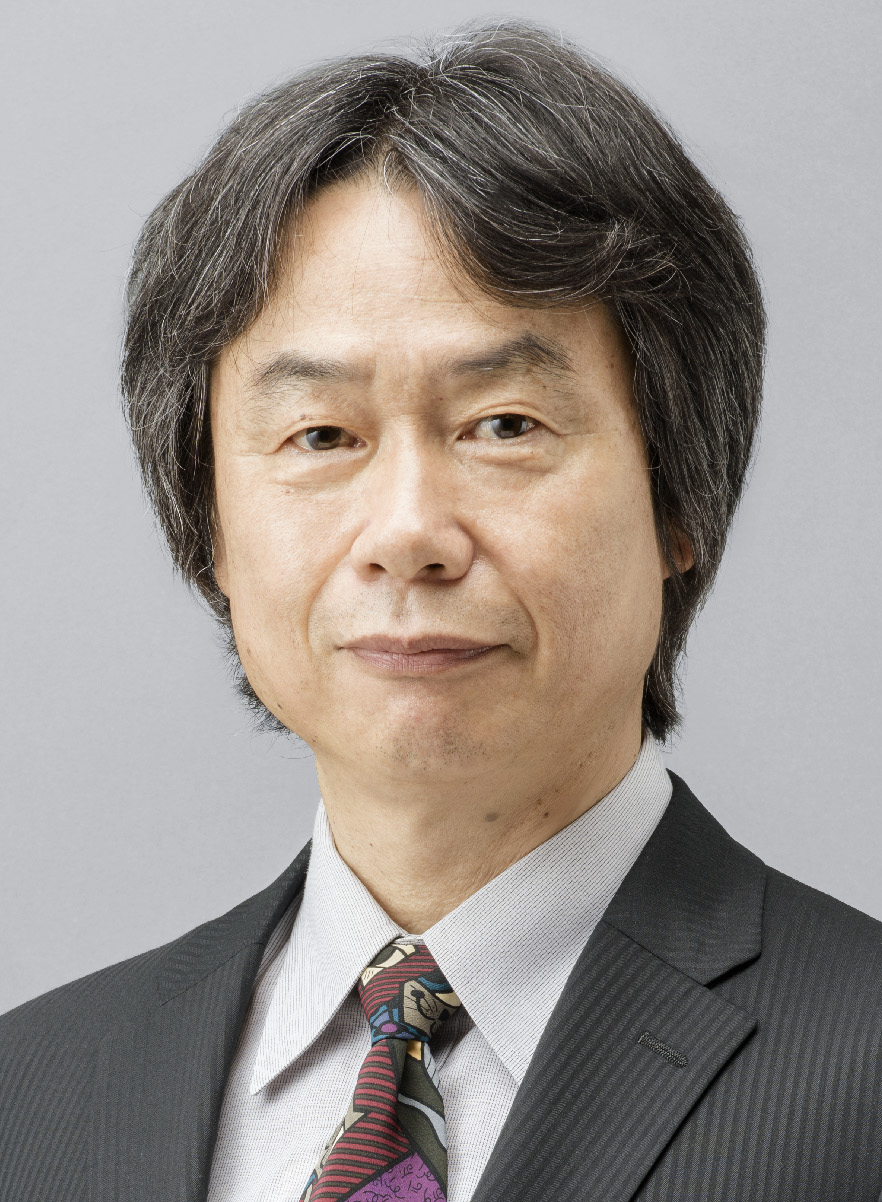
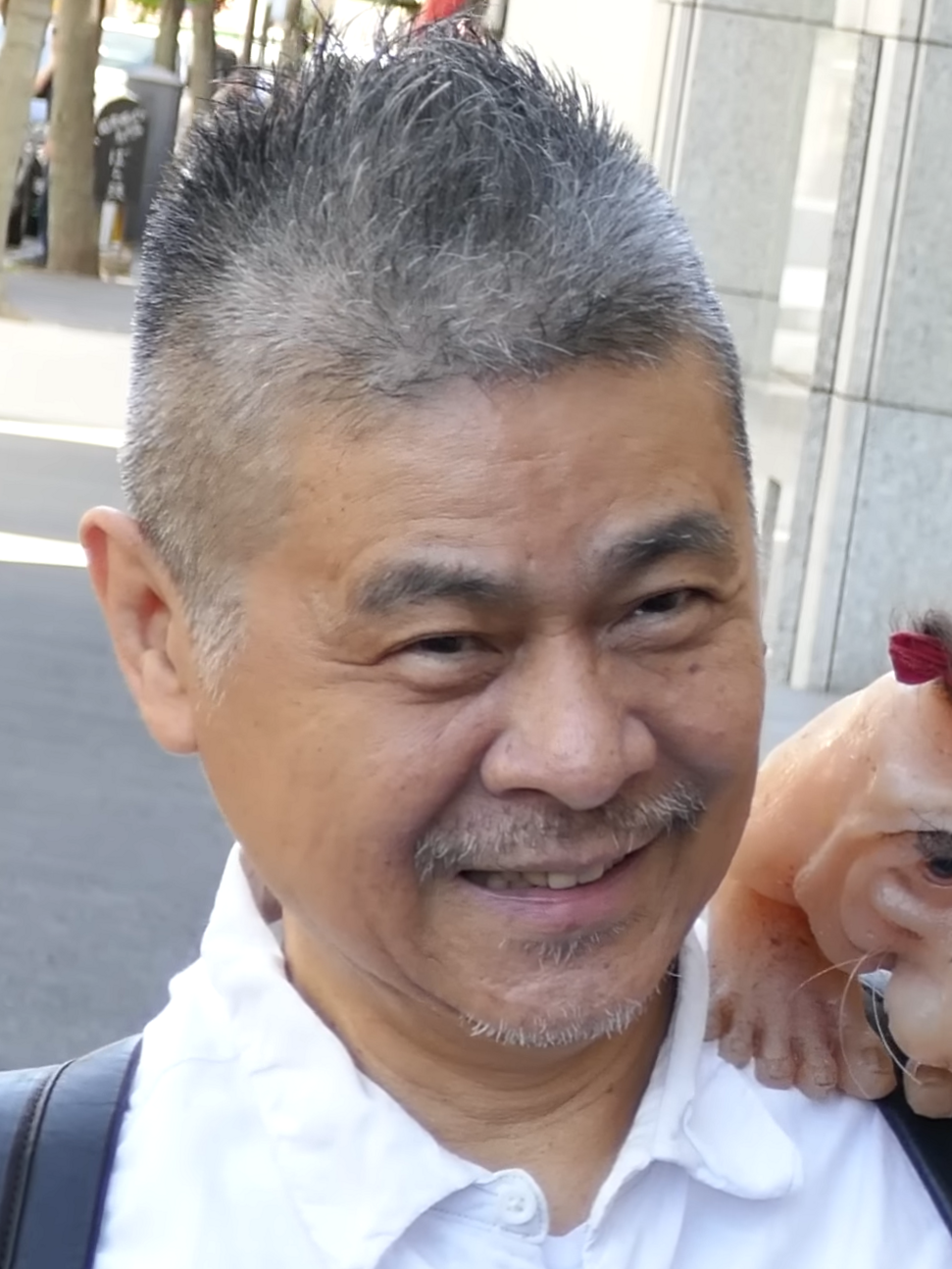
Producer Shigeru Miyamoto (left) approved the Mother project based on his confidence in Itoi (right).

EarthBound Beginnings was developed by Ape and published by Nintendo. In 1987, copywriter Shigesato Itoi became interested in role-playing games after a colleague of his introduced him to the Dragon Quest series. While playing Dragon Quest II on his Famicom, Itoi conceived of a role-playing game set in contemporary times, as he did not have much knowledge of medieval times (which the Final Fantasy and Dragon Quest series were based on) and found the former setting to be more interesting. Having no prior experience in the gaming industry, Itoi hoped a company would produce his idea for him; after he publicly defended video games on a late-night talk show, Nintendo president Hiroshi Yamauchi became interested in his work and ordered project manager Yoshio Sakamoto to invite Itoi to work on advertising for Nakayama Miho no Tokimeki High School for the Famicom Disk System.

While there, Itoi set up a meeting and pitched his idea, then titled "ESP1", to the company's Shigeru Miyamoto. He thought the setting would be unique for its incongruence with role-playing genre norms, as daily life lacked the pretense for magic powers and they could not simply give the child characters firearms as weapons. Itoi's project proposal suggested how the natural limitations could be circumvented. While Miyamoto liked Itoi's ideas, he reacted to the proposal with indifference, as opposed to the praise Itoi was expecting. He was not sure whether Itoi "could pull it off", and explained that video game concepts needed people who signed on to "make" the product, rather than in the advertising industry where concept proposals preceded the staffing process. Miyamoto stressed the amount of personal work the project would require, and asked Itoi if he could start over and "make it simpler". Itoi was overcome with "powerlessness", though he kept his composure; he would later cry from helplessness on his bullet train ride home. Itoi pondered how to make his game something that would impress people; afterwards, he would receive a phone call from Miyamoto, stating that he had found a development team for the project.

Miyamoto was also hesitant to work with Itoi at a time when companies were pushing major celebrity product endorsements, as Itoi's involvement would be for such a game. When the two met next, Miyamoto brought the documentation from a text adventure game and told Itoi that he would have to write similar documentation himself. Miyamoto said that he knew from his own experience that the game would only be as good as the effort Itoi invested, and that he knew Itoi could not invest the appropriate time with his full-time job. Itoi restated his interest and reduced his workload, so Miyamoto assembled a development team. Upon assessing for compatibility, they began production in Ichikawa, Chiba, a month after the game was green-lit by Nintendo. Itoi had said earlier that he wanted his work environment to feel like an extracurricular club consisting of volunteers and working out of an apartment, which Miyamoto tried to accommodate. Itoi wrote the game's script and commuted from Tokyo, a process he found "exhausting", but at the same time wanted "more and more". Even with asking Itoi to prioritize the development process, Miyamoto received criticism of acquiescing to a celebrity and of hiring a copywriter not up for the task. Miyamoto said that his decision to pursue the project was based on his confidence in Itoi. The game's development team was skeptical of Itoi, as they assumed he would have little participation and that the game would be a vanity project similar to other celebrity-endorsed games; Itoi surprised them by deeply involving himself with the game and forged an intimate relationship with them.

Itoi's basis for the project was to create a game he would want to play himself, and imagined what he would do if he made a game. Itoi drew upon various works for inspiration, some of them by Steven Spielberg, as he wanted to create a game as if it were made by Spielberg. Poltergeist inspired the game's opening sequence, and the concept of contacting extraterrestrials with music and the importance of Devils Tower in Close Encounters of the Third Kind influenced the game's final act. Itoi felt the game needed an element of mystery, so the world of Magicant was established to make the game a modern-day fantasy; Itoi later noted the similarities of Magicant with concepts in The Talisman, though he stated it was unintentional. The game's title, Mother, was settled upon late in development by Itoi and was drawn from various influences, including the word "mothership" and the song of the same name by John Lennon, which moved him to tears and inspired him to create a game to move its players in the same manner. It was also inspired by his own life, in which his mother was absent in his childhood due to his parents' divorce; he had forbidden himself from thinking of her, and "finally found the opportunity to shout that word I had forbade myself from saying: 'mother.'" Mother's logo design was inspired by 2001: A Space Odyssey and the Elvis Costello record Blood & Chocolate; the design of the planet representing the letter O was drawn to appear as an unrecognizable version of the familiar planet Earth.

Development for Mother took two full years, with the initial concept of the game remaining unchanged from Itoi's initial pitch. The company Ape assisted with the game's latter stages of development. Ape was founded in response to concerns from Yamauchi about the state of the gaming industry as a whole; he believed it would stagnate in its direction unless new talent was brought in to rejuvenate it. He approached Itoi with the idea of a company meant to foster such talent, and Ape was founded in March 1989, with Itoi serving as its director. The name and logo of the company were inspired by 2001: A Space Odyssey. Mother was released in Japan on July 27, 1989, for the Famicom (known as the Nintendo Entertainment System outside Japan).

=== Music ===
The game's soundtrack was composed by Keiichi Suzuki and Hirokazu Tanaka. Tanaka was a video game composer working for Nintendo who had previously composed for games such as Super Mario Land and Metroid, while Suzuki was a composer and musician for bands of many different genres. Tanaka joined Mother's team under orders from his superiors and originally did not understand what Shigesato Itoi wanted from his score; over the course of the project, he came to comprehend Itoi's vision, and a relationship of trust was built between them. Suzuki was personally hired by Itoi, as he had confidence in him from other projects they had worked on together beforehand; Suzuki had enjoyed playing games on the Famicom beforehand, but had never thought of composing a title himself. While Tanaka programmed Mother's music and sound effects, Suzuki wrote the game's soundtrack; Itoi asked Suzuki to base his compositions off pop music and to write the game's songs with real lyrics, something rare in Famicom games at that time. Suzuki considered the game's American atmosphere to be easy to write for, and found it fun to circumvent the Famicom's audio restrictions to produce sounds that had not been attempted before.

Suzuki and Tanaka primarily composed Mother's soundtrack in Suzuki's house, which Tanaka would come to from Nintendo's headquarters in Kyoto; Suzuki would play his track on a piano, which Tanaka converted into data by hand on a computer that he brought from his hotel every day. Itoi was particularly excited about using music to expand and deepen the game's world. The Famicom was only able to play three notes at a time, which Suzuki and Tanaka noted greatly limited what they were able to produce, as they could not create some of the sounds they wanted. Suzuki also worked with French musician Louis Philippe on a song titled "Flying Man", named after bird-like residents in Magicant who can serve as temporary party members, which ultimately went unused; the song would later appear in EarthBound in several forms.

"Eight Melodies"
A 32-second sample of the track, highlighting the album's vocal style and tone.

An eleven-track album of songs based on the game's soundtrack was recorded in Tokyo, London, and Bath and released by CBS/Sony Records on CD and cassette on August 21, 1989. The album was produced at Crescent Studios in England by Tanaka, Suzuki, and Itoi while Mother was still being programmed; Suzuki and Tanaka worked with Philippe, Japanese violinist Takeshi "Neko" Saito and English composers David Bedford and Michael Nyman during the making of the album. Several artists recorded vocal renditions of many of the game's songs, including London singer Catherine Warwick, Jeb Million from the band Blazer Blazer, and child tenors Jeremy Holland-Smith and Jeremy Budd from St. Paul's Cathedral Choir. Budd and Holland-Smith's performance of the "Eight Melodies" track would be used extensively in promotional material for the game. Additionally, "Flying Man" appears in the album. The album was written and recorded in English by Linda Hennrick under Itoi's direction with the intention of being released internationally; this would not transpire until 2015. The album was likened by RPGFan reviewer Patrick Gann to compositions by the Beatles and for children's television shows. He found the lyrics "cheesy and trite" but appreciated the "simple statements" in "Eight Melodies" and the "quirky and wonderful" "Magicant". Only the last song on the album is in chiptune. Gann ultimately recommended the 2003 remastered release over this version. The game's soundtrack contains several tracks later used in subsequent series games.

=== English localization ===
Screenshots from Mother (left) and EarthBound Beginnings (right). The cross present in the church is absent in the localization, with the church now being referred to as a château.

An English localization began for Mother titled as Earth Bound in 1990 and was completed in September of that year. The localization was headed by Phil Sandhop, who had previously worked on the English version of Final Fantasy. In accordance with Nintendo of America's content policies, all religious iconography, blood, breast nipples, cigarettes, (Note: As stipulated by a Californian law regarding content policies in video games at the time.) and references to violence and alcohol were removed. Additionally, NPCs similar to Peanuts characters were altered to avoid potential legal prosecution. Several features and enhancements were added to the original, including a run button, several in-game options, and an expanded ending. Holiday-based town names were renamed to appeal more to mature audiences, while some maps and graphics were redesigned for difficulty or aesthetic purposes. These changes were implemented by Sandhop, who rewrote the game's script himself, which was then sent to Nintendo Co., Ltd., where it was approved by Shigesato Itoi, Shigeru Miyamoto, and Mother's development team before being programmed and sent back to Nintendo of America for further testing. Phil Sandhop also coined Mother's English title as Earth Bound for the game to appeal to American audiences; Nintendo of America trademarked a separate title, Space Bound, as a potential title for the game's sequel. Plans finalized for Earth Bound included an English release of the Mother album soundtrack, along with an 80-page instruction manual styled after a diary belonging to George, which would end on a ripped page after taking the player halfway through the game.

Although Earth Bound was advertised and scheduled for a fall 1991 release, it was delayed and subsequently shelved. Earth Bound's cancellation has since been attributed to Nintendo of America's marketing division deeming the game unprofitable, due to the lack of market interest in the RPG genre, the cost of Earth Bound's added cartridge size and supplementary materials making it difficult to promote and manufacture, and the game's planned release being late into the NES's life cycle in light of the impending US release of the Super NES. In 1994, efforts were renewed to release Earth Bound in the United States and in Canada, but were shuttered due to the endeavor's perceived costs. According to Phil Sandhop in an interview with LostLevels.org, "the Mother project and localizing it really opened up a few eyes at Nintendo. They began working closer with Nintendo of America and the other subsidiaries to produce artwork for games that would be appropriately received anywhere in the world and not need localization". The name Earth Bound would later be carried over as the English title of Mother 2, EarthBound, with minor changes.

== Prototype ==
The "TK-69" cartridge, which was sent to Nintendo of Canada in 1994 to be evaluated for a Canadian release. It is notable for being the first game made by Nintendo to be made publicly available through dumping.

In 1998, a completed prototype cartridge of Earth Bound was found by a fan translation group named Neo Demiforce (or just Demiforce), who had been working on a preliminary English translation of Mother before the prototype was discovered. It had been sold earlier that year for $125 to an unknown buyer named "Kenny Brooks" by a game collector named Greg Mariotti, who had discovered the prototype several years earlier at a game retailer. Interested in acquiring the cartridge to publicly dump its ROM for preservation purposes, Steve Demeter, the head of Demiforce, "bullied" Mariotti to disclose Brooks' email address; Mariotti ultimately severed ties with Demiforce. A Mother fan named "EBounding" in contact with Brooks soon gave the information to Demiforce, desiring to play the game himself. Demiforce then entered into negotiations with Brooks, and as part of them, the EarthBound fan community would donate $400 for Demiforce to temporarily obtain the cartridge from Brooks in order to dump its ROM. To distinguish the prototype from EarthBound, Mother's translated sequel, the prototype's title screen was altered to display the name "EarthBound Zero", a tribute by Demeter to Street Fighter Alpha (Street Fighter Zero in Japan).

On April 27, 1998, EarthBound Zero was released to the public, along with an original back-up of Earth Bound's code. In order for Earth Bound to work on one of the most proficient NES emulators at the time, NESticle, a single byte of code in the ROM was modified; however, this led to a checksum being triggered at various points in the game, which would indefinitely lock the game on an anti-piracy screen. Another byte was modified to disable the screens entirely, and it was publicly distributed once again. Skepticism about the cartridge's authenticity soon arose from dubious members of the EarthBound fan community, initially positing alternative theories as to how the cartridge surfaced; they later came to regard the prototype as real, mainly due to Phil Sandhop confirming the cartridge's likely authenticity and the changes in Earth Bound being present in Mother 1+2. The prototype was later sold by Brooks for $1000 to a collector named Andrew DeRouin, who gave it to a friend that kept it for fourteen years; DeRouin would reacquire the cartridge from the friend for free. The cartridge, dubbed the "TK-69" prototype, was dumped once again in 2020, as Demiforce's original back-up had gone missing since its initial release. Since the discovery of the "TK-69" cartridge, multiple prototype cartridges have surfaced outside of Nintendo, with one confirmed prototype residing within the headquarters of Nintendo of America.

== Release ==
=== Sales and promotion ===
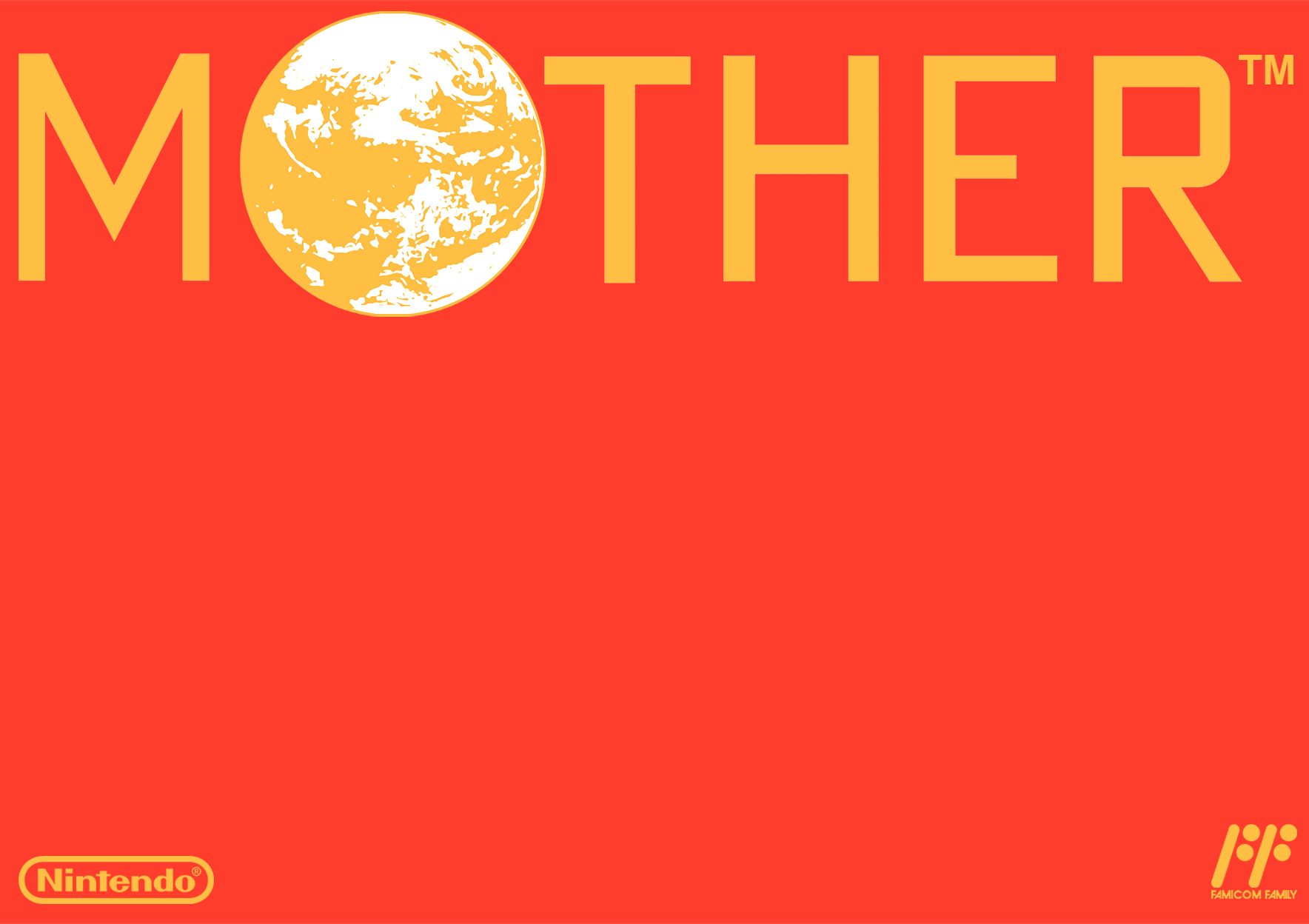
Japanese Family Computer box art

Mother was the sixth best-selling game of 1989 in Japan, where it sold about 400,000 copies. For Mother's release, it was backed by an advertising campaign highlighting Itoi's involvement as a celebrity, including a promotional video where he urged potential players to not rush through the game. It also revolved around a live-action television commercial, where child actors portraying Ninten, Ana, and Lloyd destroy a giant robot with psychic attacks before setting off for Mt. Itoi. Additionally, the advertisement featured two taglines: "No crying until the end" and "Guaranteed masterpiece", which were invented by copywriter Hiroshi Ichikura. Merchandise based on the game and its commercial was produced, along with the Mother Encyclopedia, a guidebook which contained expanded information about the game's world and characters. In addition, multiple guidebooks for Mother were released by different companies, as well as a novelization for the game penned by Saori Kumi. The game itself was packaged with a fold-out manual that included paper clay models of the game's characters and enemies, as well as a full-color map of the game's overworld, inspired by flyers from the Dragon Quest series.

=== Reception ===
Reception

Review scores
Publication	Score
Famitsu	8/10, 8/10, 8/10, 7/10 (Note: Each of the four reviewers in Famitsu scored the game on a ten point scale)
Game Informer	9/10
IGN	6.5/10
Nintendo Life	8/10
Nintendo World Report	7.5/10
RPGFan	75/100
Famicom Hisshoubon	3.5/5

Mother received a "Silver Hall of Fame" score of 31/40 from Japanese magazine Famitsu. Reviewers noted the game's similarities with the Dragon Quest series and its simultaneous "parody" of the genre's tropes. They thought the game's sequel, EarthBound, to be very similar and a better implementation of Mother's gameplay ideas. Critics also disliked the game's high difficulty level and balance issues.

Jeremy Parish of USgamer described the game as a mild-mannered parody ("between satire and pastiche") of the role-playing game genre, specifically the Dragon Quest series. He noted that Mother, like many Japanese role-playing games, emulated the Dragon Quest style: the windowed interface, first-person perspective in combat, and graphics, but differed in its contemporary setting and non-fantasy story. Parish commented that Atlus's 1987 Digital Devil Story: Megami Tensei was similarly set in the modern day, though it devolved into science fiction and fantasy in ways Mother did not. He added that the game has "a sense of wonder and magic realism ... in the context of childhood imagination", as Ninten can feel more like someone "pretending" to be a Dragon Quest-style hero than a hero in his own right. (Note: Parish added that later games such as Costume Quest and South Park: The Stick of Truth picked up on this theme.) Parish said this makes the player wonder which game events are real and which are Ninten's imagination. Parish cited Itoi's interest in entering the games industry to make a "satirical" role-playing game as proof of the genre's swift five-year rise to widespread popularity in Japan. Satoshi Tajiri wrote in Famicom Hisshoubon that Mother as a very cinematic game in terms of scenario and presentation and had a variety of new ideas never before seen in a RPG. Three reviews in Famitsu commented that initially they were uncertain of the quality the game, but felt they were rewarded after they had completed it.

Cassandra Ramos of RPGamer praised the game's graphics and music, and considered it among the console's best, with "rich, ... nicely detailed" visuals, Peanuts-style characters, and "simple but effective" audio. In contrast, she found the battle sequences aesthetically "pretty bland" and, otherwise, the game's "least interesting" aspect. Overall, she found Mother "surprisingly complex ... for its time", and considered its story superior to (but less "wacky" than) its sequel. She especially recommended the game for EarthBound fans. Two reviewers in Famitsu complimented the music, while one said the monsters in the game were particularly cute.

In Famicom Hisshoubon, Akihito Tomisawa wrote that the game would have been superior if Itoi was the only one in control of the project. Parish credited Itoi for the game's vision and compared his ability and literary interests with American author Garrison Keillor. Parish felt that Itoi's pedigree as a writer and copywriter was well suited for the space-limited, 8-bit role-playing game medium, which privileged Mother ahead of other games written by non-writers. USgamer's Parish noted how the game's non-player characters would "contemplate the profound and trivial" instead of reciting the active plot. He added that the game's lack of an official North American release has bolstered the reputation and revere of its immediate sequel.

While Parish said Mother's script was "as sharp as EarthBound's", he felt that the original's game mechanics did not meet the same level of quality. Mother lacked the "rolling HP counter" and non-random encounters for which later entries in the series were known. Parish also found the game's balance to be uneven, as the statistical character attributes and level of difficulty scaled incorrectly with the game's progression. Rose Colored Gaming, a company that made custom reproductions of the NES cartridge, noted that the Japanese release's was more challenging than the unreleased English localization. RPGamer's Ramos similarly found balance issues, with a high number of battles, difficult enemies, reliance on grinding, and some oversized levels. Parish wrote earlier for 1UP.com that in comparison to EarthBound, Mother is "worse in just about every way", a clone where its sequel was "a satirical deconstruction of RPGs". He wrote that the game's historical significance is not for its actual game but for the interest it generated in video game emulation and the preservation of unreleased games.

== Legacy ==
=== Fandom ===
Starmen.net hosted a Mother 25th Anniversary Fanfest in 2014 with a livestream of the game and plans for a remixed soundtrack. Later that year, fans released a 25th Anniversary Edition ROM hack that updated the game's graphics, script, and gameplay balance.

A fan-made documentary titled Mother to Earth, developed by film group 54&O Productions, was funded by Kickstarter in 2016 and was released on October 19, 2019. The documentary originated as a single interview with Mother's localization producer, Phil Sandhop, as part of a scrapped retrospective project; director Joshua Bone-Christian approached producer Christian Deitering about producing a documentary off the interview, as Sandhop was answering numerous questions asked by the EarthBound fanbase at the time. The documentary focuses on the road to Mother's localization and eventual release as EarthBound Beginnings in North America, and includes interviews with key people behind the process, as well as notable figures within the gaming community. The team behind Mother to Earth were encouraged by other filmmakers during the documentary's production to heighten the drama in certain areas; the team resisted, as they felt that it the project's content would make it worth watching. Mother to Earth was released on Vimeo on August 31, 2020, and was released theatrically on January 22, 2021. The documentary was also released on DVD and Blu-ray; additionally, merchandise and physical media centered around the documentary is available on the project's website.

=== Sequels and rereleases ===
In 1994, a sequel entitled Mother 2: Gīgu no Gyakushū was developed and released in Japan for the Super Famicom and was localized and released for the Super NES in 1995 as EarthBound. EarthBound was initially met with poor critical and commercial reception in the US, but has since garnered a dedicated fan community and has been critically re-evaluated as an influential cult classic. Development for the third game in the series, Mother 3, began in 1994 for the Super Famicom before shifting to the 64DD (the Nintendo 64's magneto-optical drive-based add-on) in 1996, where it was advertised as a sequel to EarthBound (titled EarthBound 64) in North America. Mother 3 struggled to find a firm release date due to difficulties with its development and was switched to the Nintendo 64's standard cartridge format in 1998 due to the 64DD's commercial failure before being cancelled in 2000, due to further development siphoning resources from the GameCube. In 2001, development for Mother 3 was restarted for the Game Boy Advance and was officially announced in 2003; a compilation cartridge titled Mother 1+2, presented only in Japanese, was released that year and retained many of the changes present in the unreleased English localization of Mother. While Mother 3 was converted to 2D graphics, its premise and scenario remained intact from its Nintendo 64 incarnation; it released to critical and commercial acclaim in Japan in 2006. It did not receive a North American release by Nintendo, despite much demand; in 2008, a fan translation spearheaded by Clyde Mandelin was released and was met with praise by fans and critics alike. Shigesato Itoi since stated that he had no plans to create a fourth series entry, effectively ending the franchise.

Since its release, Mother, alongside its sequels, EarthBound and Mother 3, have been consistently lobbied for official commercial re-releases by fans, critics, and journalists of the gaming industry alike. In 1999, a fan petition was hosted by Starmen.net to release Mother for the Game Boy Color, which went largely unacknowledged by Nintendo. An English release of Mother 1+2 was also petitioned by Starmen.net, though it did not occur, possibly as a result of the site ending their campaign too early. Despite Nintendo Power readers ranking Mother the fourth-highest most desired game for the Wii Virtual Console (with EarthBound as the most desired) in 2008, a release ultimately did not materialize. Inspired by the success of EarthBound's Virtual Console release and to commemorate the 20th anniversary of EarthBound's release in the US, Nintendo would rerelease Mother on the Wii U's Virtual Console service in Japan on June 14, 2015, and internationally the same day as EarthBound Beginnings. While the Japanese Virtual Console release of Mother retained many of the changes enacted from the Mother port in Mother 1+2, the international Virtual Console release utilized the same ROM as the unreleased NES localization of Mother, Earth Bound, with no inherent modifications. Like its successor, EarthBound, EarthBound Beginnings became one of the best selling titles for the service, particularly in North America and Europe; it ranked slightly less in Japan, behind the digital version of Splatoon. EarthBound Beginnings and EarthBound were both released for the Nintendo Classics service in North America on February 9, 2022, and internationally the following day.

The Mother series has featured several recurring elements from the first game, including Giygas, the main antagonist of Mother, and music tracks, such as "Snowman", "Pollyanna (I Believe in You)", and "Humoresque of a Little Dog". Elements from Mother have also been featured in the Super Smash Bros. series; remixed music from Mother appeared in the Onett and New Pork City stages in Super Smash Bros. Melee and Super Smash Bros. Brawl, and the Franklin Badge (an item deflects lightning attacks) appears as an item and as a trophy in Super Smash Bros. Brawl. Ninten also appears as a collectible sticker in the same game. In the Magicant stage in Super Smash Bros. for Nintendo 3DS and Wii U, clips from Mother play in the background. In addition, the company Hobonichi, founded by Mother creator Shigesato Itoi, has been producing merchandise based on the Mother series since 2020, with plushes, badges, and other merchandise having made available based on the first Mother game. In 2022, Nintendo released a Mother notebook based on the Eight Melodies from the game for the My Nintendo service, along with a luggage tag based on the Phase Distorter from EarthBound; after the Japan-only release of Mother 3 for the Nintendo Classics service, icons for the service based on Mother were released by Nintendo on February 21, 2024, for a limited time.
