= Tin Star (video game) =

1994 video game

- Developer: Software Creations
- Publisher: Nintendo of America
- Producer: Minoru Arakawa
- Designers: Marcus Lindblom; Ste Pickford; John Pickford
- Programmer: John Buckley
- Artist: Philip Bretherton
- Writer: Malcolm McGookin
- Composers: Chris Jojo; Matthew Cannon; Suddi Raval
- Platform: Super Nintendo Entertainment System
- Release: NA: November 1994
- Genre: Rail shooter
- Mode: Single-player

Tin Star is a 1994 rail shooter video game developed by Software Creations and published by Nintendo for the Super Nintendo Entertainment System (SNES). Starring anthropomorphic robot characters, it follows a seven-day adventure of the titular sheriff who fights the criminal Bad Oil Gang from taking over the town of East Driftwood.

It includes both third and first-person stages, and players can control the reticle either with a standard SNES controller, Super Scope, or the SNES Mouse. It is the third Software Creations game to be published by Nintendo, after Ken Griffey Jr. Presents Major League Baseball (1994) and (only in Europe) Plok! (1993). The game received positive reviews from critics, with praise for the presentation, especially the graphics and humor, but criticism of the monotonous gameplay and lack of challenge.

== Gameplay ==
Tin Star includes levels of both a third and first-person perspective, but all involve the player controlling the reticle.

Tin Star is an arcade-style shoot 'em up game. It is compatible with the standard Super Nintendo Entertainment System (SNES) controller, the Super Scope, and the SNES Mouse, and is the first SNES game to be playable with all controllers. From Monday to Sunday, each day consists of shooting practice with a jug, action stages, and a fast draw with a Bad Oil Gang member. The game has 31 levels, unusual for a shoot 'em up game at the time.

Though all sequences involve the player controlling the gun reticle on screen, they differ in gameplay style, featuring side-scrolling stages in the third-person and first-person sequences similar to Lethal Enforcers. The third-person segments take place on rides, stampedes, and in town, and the first-person levels are located in jails, banks, and saloons. Tin Star fights the Bad Oil Gang involved in various activities, such as robberies of trains and banks, prison breaks, and shootouts.

Cash is gained by shooting enemies, and lost by wasting bullets and damaging the town. Cash is used to save progress, and the balance determines the ending of the story. There are objects to hit, such as canteens that regain Tin Star's hit points. However, if the canteen is hit in a stage, the bonus stage afterward is disabled. In the bonus stage, cash is obtained by shooting stars that surround a woman on a spinning disk.

== Plot ==
Tin Star, a six gun-armed sheriff with Mo Crash as his sidekick and Aluminum as his horse, tries to save the town of East Driftwood from an overthrow by the criminal Bad Oil Gang. Led by Black Bart, its members include four Johnson brothers, Tiny, Bugsy, Lucky, and the Kid; and two Oil brothers, Snake and Crude. Bad Oil members have different strengths and incapacities, such as Snake Oil being fast with the gun but having poor aim, and Tiny Johnson being the opposite.

Tin Star's journey is chaotic from the start; a coach ride to the town is surrounded by criminals trying to shoot him, and when he arrives, he is instantly bombarded with missions of stopping the Bad Oil Gang's shooting of a saloon and cattle stampede. The town has just built its first railroad, which serves as its route to other prisons for the town's criminals to be sent. Many of the Bad Oil Gang members are sent to jail following multiple attempted train robberies; however, as Tin Star places the gang's Snake Oil in the slammer following a showdown, the inmates escape by wearing disguises and digging the ground for exits.

The Bad Oil Gang return to East Driftwood and shoot up the town disguised as women, taking advantage of the "Good Guy Code of the West" which restricts lawmen from shooting women and children. They try to rob a bank, take over another train, and trigger another cattle stampede. He dissolves all the incidents, in the process loophole-ing around the women-and-children rule by stating it applies only when unarmed females and juveniles are together. However, Tin Star is still unable to capture the group.

Tin Star is threatened with another quick draw by the Bad Oil Gang's The Kid Johnson. However, Tin Star faces the "Good Guy Code of the West" again, as The Kid, although an experienced gunfighter, cannot be shot due to being a child. The Kid goes away without any injuries, but the gang's leader, Black Bart, requests the kid disappear, and hires a town civilian to spread misinformation about Tin Star murdering the child. Tin Star is convicted of shooting a child and has his sheriff badge revoked, only to be taken by Black Bart, who replaces him. He is then knocked out by Mo's big brother and enemy, Schemp, and the Bad Oil Gang dumps the body in the middle of the desert.

Tin Star awakes to find his love interest and the mayor's daughter, Maria, informing him Mo has been kidnapped by the Bad Oil Gang, which is also terrorizing the saloon. Tin Star rides back to town disguised in a mask and saves Mo, stops a town shootout, finds The Kid and shows the residents he's still alive, successfully finishes off Black Bart in two quick draw encounters, destroys the Bad Oil Gang's headquarters, and gets his sheriff position back. What happens with Tin Star and Maria differs depending on the final score. Having below $750,000 results in Maria refusing to marry Tin Star, and $750,000–$999,999 results in the same with her instead marrying Mo, who inherited one million from his brother's will. If Tin Star has more than one million dollars, Maria is revealed to be Black Bart in disguise. Bart reasons that he wore it to learn Tin Star's secrets.

== Development ==
Tin Star is the third Software Creations-developed game published by Nintendo, after working with them on Ken Griffey Jr. Presents Major League Baseball (1994) and Nintendo publishing Plok! (1993) in Europe. Nintendo hired the Manchester developer to work on a light gun game for the SNES in compensation for not assigning them a follow-up to Ken Griffey Jr. Presents Major League Baseball, which went to Rare. The game was developed out of founder Richard Kay's concept of a Western shoot 'em up with robot characters, inspired by the 1973 film Westworld. Software Creations was the first developer to hire professional artists, with a catalog including a hand-drawn animation style which Kay was a fan of. Tin Star's team included animator Scott Pleydell-Pearce and background artist Deborah Graham. It became one of six games featured by Nintendo at the 1994 summer Consumer Electronics Show (CES), and was released exclusively in North America in November 1994. Marcus Lindblom helped design the gameplay; he would later be more well known for his localization of Earthbound.

== Reception ==
Reception

Review scores
| Publication | Score |
|---|---|
| Consoles + | 91% |
| Computer and Video Games | 86/100 |
| EP Daily | 8/10 |
| Game Players | 80% |
| GamePro | 4/5; 4/5; 3.5/5; 3.5/5 |
| Nintendo Power | 3.6/5; 3.4/5; 3.7/5; 3.7/5 |
| Official Nintendo Magazine | 85/100 |
| Super Game Power | 2.8/5 |
| Super Play | 61% |
| Total! | 82/100 |
| VideoGames & Computer Entertainment | 8/10 |
| Total! (DE) | 2+ |
| Última Generación | 82/100 |

An estimated 50,000 copies of the game were sold.

Critics called Tin Star fun, easy, and suitable for young players. It was considered unique from other shoot 'em up games for its comic nature, cartoon graphics, and quick draw bosses, which Última Generación declared the best all-time aspect of games in the genre. It was found to be very playable due to its decent control and ability to modify cursor speed and difficulty. Computer and Video Games called it the best game to use the Super Scope, and GamePro and Total! claimed it was the easiest to play with the Super Scope and Mouse. The graphics were frequently lauded and called by Total! journalist Frank the best on the SNES; this includes the varied visual styles, colorfulness, jocularity, interactiveness, and attention to detail. The music and sound effects were praised for capturing a Wild West aesthetic, and the humor and story was enjoyed by many critics. Exceptions were Markus Hawkins of Super Play and GamePro's Tommy Glide.

Reactions to the gameplay were mixed. Some reviewers thought the levels were diverse, and others found the general experience monotonous, limiting in challenge, lacking in replay value, and taking under a day to finish. Hawkins was stressed by the quickdraw bosses, but lamented the recycled enemy placements and not being able to shoot at certain instances. However, Consoles+ found it much harder with easy segments in scarcity; and an Última Generación writer criticized a difficulty spike from the fifth to the sixth day, also finding it tough and annoying to kill small enemies. Some reviewers disliked the absence of a two-player mode.
