= Marcus Lindblom =

American video game developer

- Born: 1962 or 1963 (age 63–64)
- Occupation: Video game developer
- Known for: EarthBound localization

Marcus Lindblom (born 1962 or 1963) is an American video game developer known for his English localization of the 1994 video game EarthBound. Lindblom spent his youth in the United States, and dropped out of college to move to Japan with his wife. After four years, he returned to college in the United States and began to work at Nintendo of America's call center. He eventually worked on Japanese-to-English game localization projects such as Wario's Woods and, most notably, EarthBound. Lindblom worked with a translator and a writer to accurately translate the game for a Western audience. He sought to stay true to Shigesato Itoi's script, but was given latitude to make the script as weird as he wanted, and so added in American cultural allusions. Lindblom considers the localization his highest achievement.

He worked at Nintendo until 1996, when he left to work at other developers including Electronic Arts, Vivendi Games, Midway Games, and THQ. He established Partly Cloudy Games with friends around 2009, and as of 2013, runs mobile games studio Carried Away Games. After following the fan community from afar, he came out to fans in mid 2012 and the press began to show greater interest in his work. He had planned to write a book about the game's development, release, and fandom as a Kickstarter project before a reply from Nintendo discouraged him from pursuing the idea.

== Early life and career ==
Born in 1962 or 1963, Marcus Lindblom was raised in "a traditional, middle-class family". He dropped out of college, married, and moved with his spouse to Japan in the late 1980s. They planned to stay several months, but stayed four years before returning in 1990.

== EarthBound ==
In the United States, Lindblom returned to college and, in 1990, began to work at Nintendo of America's customer service and game assistance call center in Redmond, Washington. He would wake up at four a.m. to work before class, a schedule he considered "energizing". Upon his graduation, Lindblom became a Software Analyst at Nintendo, where he worked on their games.

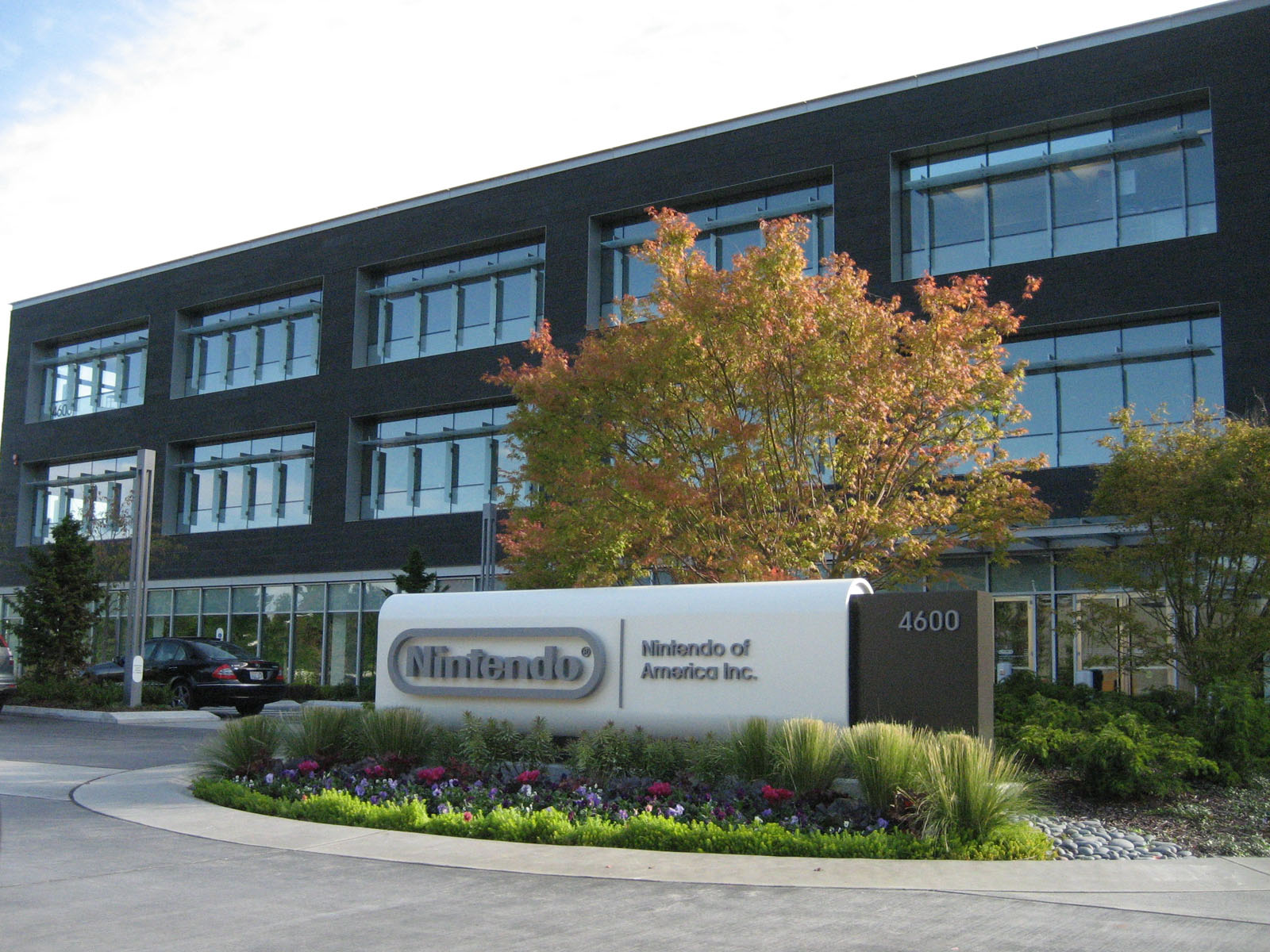
Nintendo of America's Redmond, Washington headquarters

Lindblom later transitioned to work as a localizer, where he translated Nintendo's Japanese games into English for Western audiences. As standard for the time, he worked without a department and in direct contact with the headquarters, (Note: In later years, localizations were performed by whole departments.) which gave him wide decision-making latitude. Lindblom worked on Wario's Woods before coming to the EarthBound project around January 1995. He took over for Nintendo of America's Dan Owsen, who had localized a tenth of the game's script before moving to another project. The game was roughly translated from Japanese by a translator, and Lindblom received a paper script with the translation. Masayuki Miura, a Japanese writer, worked with Lindblom to contextualize the English script for the mood and message intended by the game's original development team.

Lindblom found his task of translating an "outsider's view of the U.S." for an American audience the hardest part of the localization. Nintendo did not want a direct translation, but a more American version of the script. He recalled that he was given latitude to make the script "as weird as [he] wanted" but also sought to stay true to the original text's translation, though he never communicated with Shigesato Itoi (the game's creator) directly. Lindblom's own humor and office in-jokes worked their way into the script alongside cultural allusions to pieces of American pop culture, including cartoon character Bugs Bunny, comedian Benny Hill, and musical mockumentary This Is Spinal Tap. Outside of the game's script, Lindblom's in-game text includes the item and weapon names as well as the combat prompts. His writing contains multiple Easter eggs, such as in some of the character's names. One character is named after his daughter, Nico, who was born during the localization process. After taking the day off for her birthday, Lindblom recalled working for the next 30 days straight, without weekends off. He remembered the workload as large, and recalled "grinding-out" for about 14 hours a day. The localization process took four months.

Lindblom credited Miura and the game's affirming "tone" as what helped him manage the magnitude of the project. He remembers the game as "very [positive at its heart]" and wrote it to be "a glass half full kind of game". When asked of his favorite contribution to the final work, Lindblom remembered the character Pokey's mother, Lardna. He described the name choice as "just the most ridiculous thing to have picked". Nicholas Dean Des Barres of DieHard GameFan, an original reviewer, wrote that EarthBound was translated "impeccably" and praised the game's humor. In the period following its release, the game's English localization has found praise. Localization reviewer Clyde Mandelin described the Japanese-to-English conversion as "top-notch for its time". Kotaku found the localization "funny, clever, and evocative".

The American localization team was devastated by the release's poor critical response and sales. Lindblom recalled that the game's reception was hurt by appearing "simplistic" in an age that revered graphics quality. He felt that the game's changes to the RPG formula—e.g., the rolling HP meter and fleeing enemies—were ignored in the following years. At the time of the game's Virtual Console rerelease, he felt the game had aged well.

== After EarthBound ==
Lindblom worked on several other Nintendo games and left in 1996. He later worked at studios such as Electronic Arts, Vivendi Games, Midway Games, and THQ. Lindblom established Partly Cloudy Games with friends around 2009. The company has contracted with Microsoft and is also developing a real-time strategy Facebook game named The Robot Apocalypse. As of 2013, Lindblom runs Carried Away Games, a mobile games studio. He described many of the games he worked on in his career as "forgettable" and the eventual popularity of EarthBound as "satisfying". He cited the example of a wedding proposal done through hacked text in EarthBound as something he appreciated. After following the fan community from afar, in mid-2012, Lindblom approached the Fangamer booth at the Penny Arcade Expo and explained his involvement in the game. When EarthBound was announced for the Wii U Virtual Console, the press began to show greater interest in Lindblom's work. Lindblom had planned a book about the game's development, release, and fandom as a Kickstarter project before a reply from Nintendo discouraged him from pursuing the idea. (Note: The book, EarthBound Confidential, was set to be a limited edition offered as an ebook and in print.) He did not plan to profit from the book, but felt he "owed" the fan community for its dedication. In response, he said he plans to continue his ongoing dialogue with the community. Lindblom told Kotaku that he thinks of the EarthBound localization as his "finest accomplishment".

== Credits ==
Marcus Lindblom's video game credits
Year	Title	Platform	Role
1994	Tin Star	SNES	Designer
1994	Wario's Woods	NES, SNES	Localization
1995	EarthBound	SNES	Localization
1995	Mario's Tennis	Virtual Boy	Localization
1996	NBA Live 97	PC	Associate producer, localization
1996	NHL 97	PC; Sega Saturn	Localization director (Electronic Arts Canada); Quality assurance
1996	Road & Track Presents: The Need for Speed	Sega Saturn	Associate producer
1996	Road & Track Presents: The Need for Speed SE	PC	Associate producer
1997	Need for Speed II	PC, PlayStation	Associate producer
1998	NBA Live 98	PC	Associate producer
2000	Army Men: Sarge's Heroes	Dreamcast	Producer
2000	Die Hard Trilogy 2: Viva Las Vegas	PlayStation	Producer
2000	Rampage Through Time	PlayStation	Producer
2000	Toobin'	Game Boy Color	Producer
2002	The Lord of the Rings: The Fellowship of the Ring	Game Boy Advance	Producer
2003	Enclave	PC	Producer
2003	Mace Griffin: Bounty Hunter	PC, Xbox	Producer
2004	Evil Genius	PC	Producer
2005	Evil Dead: Regeneration	Xbox	Project manager
2010	Perplexo Seasons	iOS	Co-creator, developer
2010	Perplexo Seasons Premium	iOS	Co-creator, developer
2010	Zapples	iOS	Co-creator, developer
2011	Perplexo Words	iOS	Co-creator, developer
2017	Star Fox 2	Super NES Classic Edition	Localization
