= EarthBound fandom =

Fan community

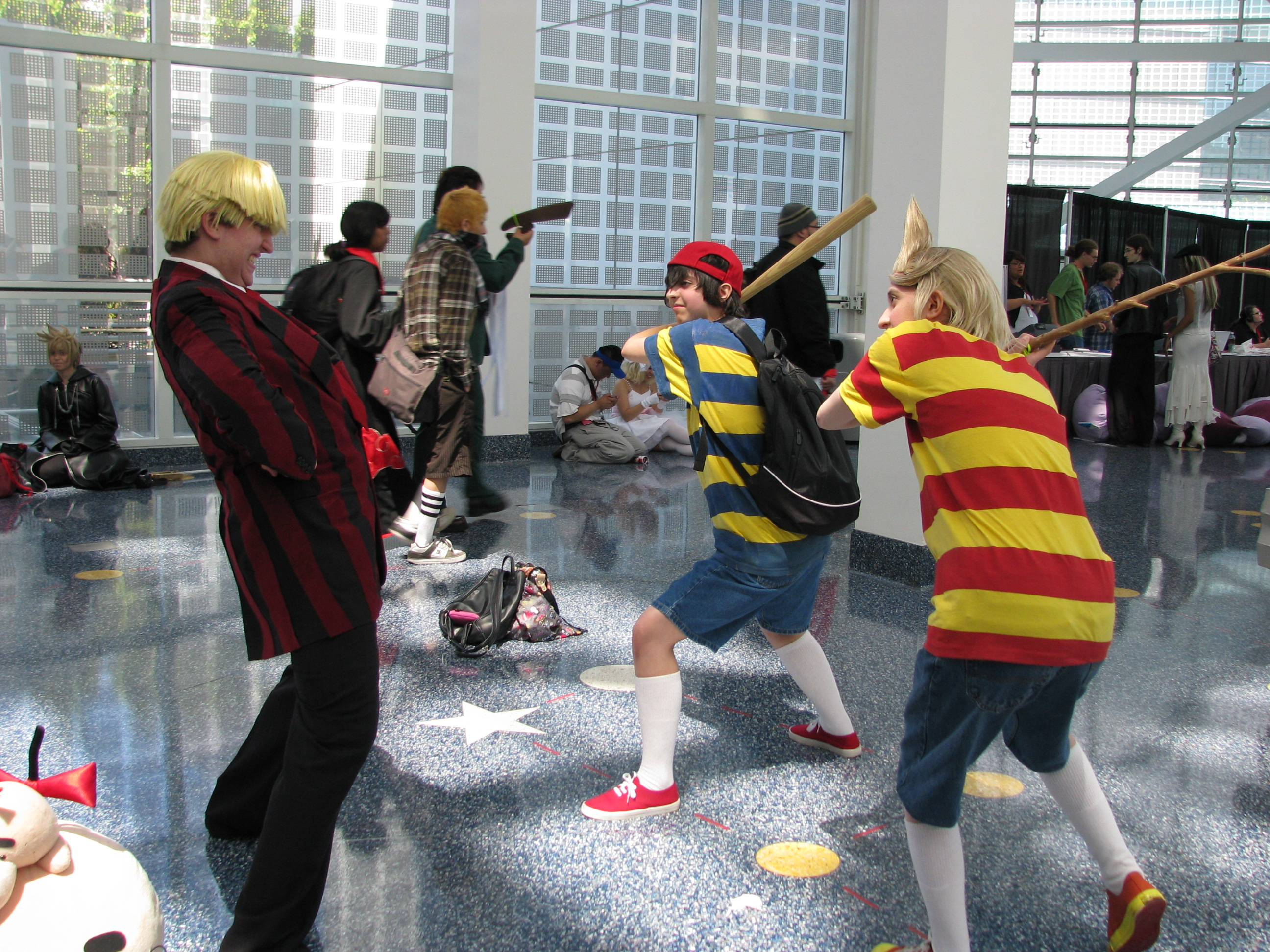
Mother series cosplayers in 2010

The 1994 video game EarthBound, as well as its 1989 predecessor and 2006 sequel are known for their cult following and fan community. Multiple video game journalists have written about the dedication of the franchise's fans in producing fan art and lobbying Nintendo for further releases. The company has been largely unresponsive to their efforts. Prominent fansites include Starmen.net and EarthBound Central. The former was started in 1999 and became the definitive community website. Their members organized petitions and campaigns to bring English-localized games from the Mother series to North America. One such effort included a full-color, 270-page EarthBound Anthology as a demonstration of consumer demand for further releases. After nearly a decade, EarthBound was rereleased for the Wii U Virtual Console in 2013, whereupon it became a bestseller.

The fandom also spun-out other enterprises. When Nintendo did not release a localized version of Mother 3, fans organized their own fan translation. The video game merchandising business Fangamer grew out of the Starmen.net community, and sells video game-related items online. A full-length documentary on Starmen.net and the fan community, EarthBound USA, was released in November 2023. While series creator Shigesato Itoi has stated that he is finished with the series, a fan-created spiritual sequel, Oddity, began development in 2010, while another, Mother 4, was announced in 2021.

== Fan base ==
Notable EarthBound fandom members include Toby Fox (left) and Chuggaaconroy (right).

EarthBound is known for having a cult following, which developed over time well after its release. Colin Campbell of Polygon wrote that "few gaming communities are as passionate and active" as EarthBound's, and 1UP.com's Bob Mackey wrote that no game was as poised to have a cult following. Wired described the amount of EarthBound "fan art, videos, and tributes on fan sites like EarthBound Central or Starmen.net" as mountainous. IGN's Lucas M. Thomas wrote in 2006 that EarthBound's "persistent", "ambitious", and "religiously dedicated collective of hardcore fans" would be among the first groups to influence Nintendo's decision-making through their purchasing power on Virtual Console. The Verge cited the two-year fan translation of Mother 3 as proof of the fanbase's dedication, and Nintendo president Satoru Iwata credited the community response on their online Miiverse social platform as leading to EarthBound's eventual rerelease on their Virtual Console platform. A notable member of the EarthBound fan base is video game developer Robert F. Fox, professionally known as Toby Fox, who had made various EarthBound ROM hacks in high school, including the EarthBound Halloween Hack in 2008, and whose game Undertale took inspiration from the Mother series. Another is Let's Play YouTuber Emile Rosales, known online as Chuggaaconroy, whose videos on EarthBound covered various aspects of the game including the sound, art design and various glitches.

EarthBound was hard to find before the rerelease. In 2013, prices for the game's cartridge alone were more than twice its retail cost at its 1995 release. IGN wrote that the game became a "cult classic" for its unique RPG and psychedelic elements alongside its reflection on American culture, and Eurogamer credited EarthBound's "cute and funny modern-world styling of the Japanese RPG". Kotaku hypothesized that fan favorite aspects of the game would include its "feeling of innocence, ... sense of whimsical adventure", "humor", "charm", "wonder", and "beautiful 2D maps". Marcus Lindblom, the game's English localizer, cited its "cuteness, colors, and hallucinatory bits" as fan favorites. Reid Young of Starmen.net and Fangamer credits EarthBound's popularity to its "labor of love" nature, with a "double-coat of thoughtfulness and care" across all aspects of the game by a development team that appeared to love their work.

Digital Trends's Anthony John Agnello wrote that no video game fans have suffered as much as EarthBound fans, and cited Nintendo's reluctance to release Mother series games in North America. IGN described the series as neglected by Nintendo in North America for similar reasons. Aaron Linde of Shacknews felt that Nintendo's "historic passive-aggression towards EarthBound fans [seemed] somehow anachronistic" in response to the outcries from the game's fan community. He added that while the company is known for providing "the most personal experiences in gaming's history", Nintendo lacks the "bedside manner" required of contemporary game companies, and that he could not think of a "more deserving fan base" than EarthBound's.

Marcus Lindblom, who localized the Japanese Mother 2 into the English EarthBound, followed the fan community from afar and, in mid-2012, introduced himself at the Penny Arcade Expo Fangamer booth. When the game's Wii U re-release was announced, the press became interested in Lindblom's experience. Lindblom had planned a book about the game's development, release, and fandom as a Kickstarter project before a reply from Nintendo discouraged him from pursuing the idea. He plans to continue to communicate directly with the community about the game's history. For instance, Lindblom struck down a popular ("infamous") "abortion theory" that the game's final sequence is a metaphor for an abortion, with Giygas as the fetus.

A film group known as 54&O Productions developed a fan-made documentary entitled Mother to Earth. The documentary focuses on the road to Mother's localization in North America, and includes interviews with key people behind the process. It was released on August 31, 2020.

The fan website Mother Forever hosted an annual "Mother Direct" live presentation of Mother-related fan projects.

== Starmen.net ==
Reid Young started an EarthBound fansite in 1997 while in middle school. It was one of the first EarthBound fansites on the Internet. By 1999 and with co-founder Clyde "Tomato" Mandelin, the site grew into Starmen.net, named for the game's "most iconic villain, the Starman". 1UP.com described the site as "the definitive fan community for EarthBound on the web" and Shacknews called it the fan community's "one-stop" resource for a decade. Though EarthBound was more obscure at the time, the site quickly grew in popularity and featured "constant updates" and a burgeoning community by 1999. 1UP.com said the viewership growth was "almost inexplicable" when accounting for the game's unpopularity, but credited Super NES emulation, which let "thousands" of people experience the game who might not have otherwise. Young credited the site's growth to the fan content generated by the community. Shacknews described the site's collection of fan-made media as "absolutely massive". It also provided a place to aggregate information on the Mother series and to coordinate fan actions.

The EarthBound fan community at Starmen.net coalesced with the intent to have Nintendo of America acknowledge the Mother series. 1UP.com described their intent as reasonable given the company's "frequent dismissal" of the series alongside the community's "monumental efforts to increase American EarthBound awareness". Young felt that their "underdog status" kept Starmen.net vigilant. He also said that he views the community as "a big group of friends having fun together" and sometimes thinks that it is just happenstance that EarthBound was what brought them together, as opposed to another franchise like Pokémon. As the site started in 1999, the community started a petition to have Nintendo release Mother for the Game Boy Color, and collected 1850 physical signatures to this end and bound it in a book for Nintendo. The final word from Nintendo was that the package was received. Other petitions include the 2000 10,000-person petition for a North American Mother 3 release on the Nintendo 64, the 2003 31,000-person petition for a North American Mother 1+2 Game Boy Advance release, and letter and phone campaigns. A source internal to Nintendo later told them that the 2003 campaign was almost successful, but fell out of consideration as the phone campaign ended after a week. The community resolved to never let up again.

The community's massive pile of art, videos, music, and writing is a testament to the creativity of its fans.

— Reid Young of Starmen.net, March 2010

In time, the fan community's requests shifted from specific demands to no demand at all, wanting only their interest to be recognized by Nintendo. The Starmen.net community launched several campaigns to bring attention to the series. In their 2007 "The EB Siege" project to have Mother 3 receive an official North American localization, community members sent letters and made phone calls to Nintendo. They ultimately created a full-color, 270-page art book, The EarthBound Anthology, to send to Nintendo and press outlets as demonstration of their interest. They also hoped the volume would mobilize established industry professionals to take up their cause in advance of the 2007 Electronic Entertainment Expo. Shacknews wrote that the "folk history" was more of a proposal than a collection of fan art—"the greatest gaming love letter ever created". Wired's Chris Kohler used the Anthology's occasion to explain how Nintendo's upper management has heard the fan community. The Anthology additionally received mention in Nintendo Power. Upon "little" response from Nintendo, they decided to localize the game themselves. Starmen.net co-founder Tomato led the project, and the complete fan translation was finished in October 2008. They then printed a "professional quality strategy guide" through Fangamer, a site that spun off from Starmen.net.

Other oblique strategies included an attempt to license Mother 3 for North America from Nintendo through a small video game development studio, but Nintendo replied that the property was theirs and should not be developed externally. In 2008, the site hosted a YouTube contest for videos that raised the visibility for the series in a final effort to get the game on the Wii Virtual Console, but Young found community spirit to be atrophied. A week later, the game appeared on the ESRB website, which signaled success after many years of work. It was finally rereleased for the Wii U Virtual Console in 2013 via a Nintendo Direct announcement. The game was a "top-seller" on the platform, and Kotaku users and first-time EarthBound players had an "overwhelmingly positive" response to the game.

=== Mother 3 fan translation ===
After a decade of development hell, the Japanese video game Mother 3 was released in April 2006. When fan interest in an English localization went unanswered by Nintendo, Starmen.net announced their own fan translation in November. The project was led by the fansite's Clyde "Tomato" Mandelin, a professional game translator whose previous work includes games such as Kingdom Hearts II and anime such as Dragon Ball.

The dozen fans who worked on the project had been vetted by Mandelin and had prior localization experience. Thousands of hours were put into the project between hacking the game data and translating the 1,000 pages of scripted dialogue. They built their own tools for the work. The final version was released in October 2008 and issued as a patch to be used with an emulator. The patch was downloaded over 100,000 times in its first week. A fan-made, full-color, 200-page, professional-quality player's guide was released alongside the fan translation. 1UP.com wrote that "no other game in the history of time garnered such a rabid demand for translation", and The Verge cited the effort as proof of the fan base's dedication.

=== Fangamer ===
Logo of Fangamer

Fangamer is a video game merchandising business spun out from Starmen.net. The online store sells items including hats, pins, and T-shirts branded with video game-related designs from games such as EarthBound, Chrono Trigger, and Metal Gear Solid. 1UP.com described their fare as "much less tacky than your typical mall-bought video game apparel". The site began in part due to Young's experience with targeted fan communities. In October 2008, he was attempting to get the site officially licensed. Later that month, they released the Mother 3 Handbook, a full-color, 200-page player's guide akin to a professional strategy guide. Wired reported its quality to be "on par with ... Prima and BradyGames". In 2014, Fangamer crowdfunded a box set of media celebrating EarthBound, with $230,000 raised—over twice its goal. The box set includes a travel zine for the game's fictional settings EarthBound, an album of music, and the documentary EarthBound USA. Since exceeding the campaign's goal, the business hosted Camp Fangamer, an event in Tucson, Arizona, for 450 fans.

=== EarthBound USA ===
Just finished an interview with some American MOTHER 2 fans who came to see me. Some of them were in elementary school when they played it but are now married with children, and still have a love for the game to this day. I've had all sorts of projects in my time, but this game is definitely in a league of its own.

— Tweet from Shigesato Itoi, preempting the documentary's announcement, March 2014

In April 2014, siblings Jazzy and Robbie Benson announced the production of their documentary "about how EarthBound fans have fought to popularize the Mother series in North America since the 1990s", EarthBound USA. The Bensons had been conducting interviews with EarthBound fans and Starmen.net members for a year prior to the announcement. They had previously begun a feature-length film about the events of EarthBound. Starmen.net "inspired" the documentary, which seeks to explain how the site's members convened via online message board and the consequent "re-emergence of a cult classic" and birth of Fangamer. The filmmakers had been planning to wait longer before making the announcement, but were preempted in part by interest following a tweet from series creator Shigesato Itoi, which mentioned their interview. Originally scheduled for a 2016 release, the film's production underwent numerous delays until 2023, when it was released on November 27. A showing before its public release was held in Tucson, Arizona.

== Fangames ==
=== Mother 4 / Oddity ===
After Mother 3, Shigesato Itoi declared that he was done with the series. Fans wanting the series to be continued began to develop unofficial fangame sequels, starting with Mother 4 in October 2010. As of September 2016, the Mother 4 development team had not received a cease and desist letter from Nintendo. In a preview of the game, Jason Schreier of Kotaku said Mother 4 looked "stunning", as "everything you could possibly want out of a new Mother game", from the music to the environment design. The game was originally planned for release in 2014, but has been delayed twice, with no future release date set. Mother 4 was to be playable as a standalone game, without need for an emulator. In 2017, after many recent Nintendo fan games received a DMCA notice, the team decided to rebrand it as an original IP, Oddity, and remove all direct references to the Mother series.

The game takes place in a parody of contemporary America, as a boy named Travis leaves his town of Belring to join three others in a fight against the "mysterious" Modern Men. The game is expected to associate with the stories of the previous series games, and be similar in length. Its music and visuals are similar in style to the rest of the series. Oddity features a new soundtrack. Its creators are currently working on a voluntary basis without compensation. While a handful of builds of the game have been leaked, their barebones nature has led many to assert the game is vaporware or in development hell.

=== Bound to the Dark World ===
Bound to the Dark World is a 2025 ROM hack of EarthBound that recreates Deltarune Chapter 1 by Toby Fox in its entirety. A project two years in development, it was developed by members of the fandom Chromadeline, Isaiah Mark, and Atlantixa. Bound to the Dark World recreates all music, characters, and areas from the original Deltarune Chapter 1 inside the EarthBound engine using ROM hacking tools. Bound to the Dark World was well received by critics for its accuracy to recreate a modern game in EarthBound.

Bound to the Dark World's development began development as an idea in early 2023, The developers faced many difficulties during production, with some of the developers feeling like it may never be finished. They had to work within EarthBound's technical constraints, such as the limit of 64 unique tiles for a battle background, which required optimization. The ROM hack was developed in secrecy for over two years before being announced on October 29, and later released on October 31 — the 7th anniversary of Deltarune Chapter 1.

Bound to the Dark World was well received by critics for its accuracy to recreate a modern game in EarthBound. Miri Teixeira of GamesRadar said the ROM hack "really is impressive". Bound to the Dark World is a role-playing game with the same gameplay to the original EarthBound. The visuals, which include modified sprites and music, are replaced with the ones from Deltarune Chapter 1.

As Bound to the Dark World is a ROM hack of EarthBound, its gameplay is similar, but with a few changes:

- Since Deltarune lacks any sort of PSI features from EarthBound, the mechanic was replaced by the "Act" button from Deltarune. Similarly, the PSI meter has been replaced by "TP".
- The bullet hell battle system as seen in both Undertale and Deltarune has been replaced by the battle system of EarthBound.
- When a party member gets hit, it goes through a rolling HP meter as seen in EarthBound instead of taking damage immediately in Deltarune.

=== Other games ===
A separate Mother 4 is in development as of late 2021, and includes elements like rolling hit point counters, rhythm-based attacks, and an art style derivative of the series Mother Squared is a remake of the SNES EarthBound in an open source game engine. EarthBound Dimensions is a 3D reimagining of EarthBound. Mother Encore is a reimagining of the NES Mother, with updates such as overworld abilities and rolling hit point counters.
