= Citizens of Earth =

2015 video game

- Developer: Eden Industries
- Publisher: Atlus
- Platforms: Microsoft Windows; PlayStation 4 PlayStation Vita; Wii U Nintendo 3DS
- Release: NA: January 21, 2015; EU: January 23, 2015
- Genre: Role-playing
- Mode: Single-player

Citizens of Earth is a role-playing video game developed by Eden Industries and published by Atlus for Microsoft Windows, PlayStation 4, PlayStation Vita, Wii U, and the Nintendo 3DS. Players take control of the newly elected Vice President of Planet Earth, who must save the Earth by recruiting citizens to fight for him. A sequel, Citizens of Space, was released in June 2019, before both getting remastered in 2021 as Citizens Unite: Earth X Space.

== Gameplay ==
Citizens of Earth has been described as "a giant spoof on EarthBound" in which "you must collect your constituents like Pokémon". In it, you take the role of the newly elected Vice President of Earth, who begins his first day in office facing protestors, a missing president, and a suspicious coffee shop. As the game progresses, characters are added to the party, each with a unique title and personality, like Hippie Guy and Programmer.

Enemies are strewn about the overworld map, and should the vice president get too close, a separate battle screen will open up. He doesn't do any fighting himself, but instead gives commands to his party of up to three characters.

== Development ==
Citizens of Earth was developed by Eden Industries and directed by Ryan Vandendyck. Various ideas coalesced, leading to the game being created. One of the first ideas Vandendyck had was having the heroes be regular townspeople, and he also chose to set the game in modern times because he felt that this made the regular townspeople feel more regular. The protagonist was chosen because he wanted there to be a leader type who is above the other characters in his role. The setting was also inspired by EarthBound. There were also certain game mechanics that were borrowed from EarthBound, including having enemies join another enemy in a fight if they're near enough and automatically defeating weak enemies. He also made the battle system with influence from Dragon Quest and EarthBound (which play similarly). When designing the visuals, Vandendyck wanted to avoid using a too-common style among indie games, going with a cartoony style that he felt fit the modern Western setting.

== Reception ==
Reception

Aggregate score
| Aggregator | Score |
|---|---|
| Metacritic | 66/100 |

Review scores
| Publication | Score |
|---|---|
| IGN | 6.5/10 |
| Polygon | 8/10 |

Citizens of Earth holds a rating of 66/100 on review aggregate site Metacritic, indicating "mixed or average reviews". Meghan Sullivan of IGN gave the game a 6.5/10, saying "It charmed me with its blend of old-school RPG and contemporary satire, but nearly lost my vote with its sluggish pacing, irritatingly high enemy encounter rate, and crashes".
