= Daniel Owsen =

American video game translator for Nintendo

- Occupation: Nintendo of America Localization Manager
- Known for: Translator of many Nintendo video games

Daniel "Dan" Owsen is an American video game translator at Nintendo of America (NOA), best known for his role in the translation and localization of many Nintendo video games, playing a large role in the translation of The Legend of Zelda series. He is also known for his now-discontinued "Ask Dan" column on Nintendo's official website. As of 2015, Owsen lives in Seattle, Washington.

== Career ==
Owsen started at NOA in 1989. He started in Consumer Service during the days of the Nintendo Entertainment System, and has since moved from department to department, first going to Publications, then to Product Development, then back to Publications as the on-line manager. He has worked with Shigeru Miyamoto's R&D team, writing screen texts for Legend of Zelda titles A Link to the Past, Link's Awakening and Ocarina of Time. Owsen is one of the first English-language voices used in any Nintendo console, as his voice can be heard at the beginning of Super Metroid – "The last Metroid is in captivity... the galaxy is at peace."

Owsen had translated around 10 percent of the script of EarthBound, including some of the game's "most iconic phrases", before handing over the project to Marcus Lindblom and moving on to a different project.

== Credited games ==
- Metroid II: Return of Samus (1991)
- The Legend of Zelda: A Link to the Past (1991)
- Star Fox (1993)
- Kirby's Adventure (1993)
- The Legend of Zelda: Link's Awakening (1993)
- Wario Land: Super Mario Land 3 (1994)
- Super Metroid (1994)
- EarthBound (1994)
- Illusion of Gaia (1994)
- Donkey Kong Country (1994)
- Kirby's Avalanche (1995)
- Donkey Kong Land (1995)
- Teleroboxer (1995)
- Galactic Pinball (1995)
- Killer Instinct (1995)
- Terranigma (1995)
- Donkey Kong Country 2: Diddy's Kong Quest (1995)
- The Legend of Zelda: Ocarina of Time (1998)
