= EarthBound =

1994 video game

- North American box art by Mike Takagi, depicting a Final Starman with Ness's reflection in its visor
- Developers: Ape Inc. HAL Laboratory (Note: Pax Softnica developed the Game Boy Advance port.)
- Publisher: Nintendo
- Director: Shigesato Itoi
- Producers: Shigesato Itoi; Satoru Iwata; Tsunekazu Ishihara
- Designer: Akihiko Miura
- Programmers: Satoru Iwata; Kouji Malta
- Artist: Kouichi Ooyama
- Writer: Shigesato Itoi
- Composers: Keiichi Suzuki; Hirokazu Tanaka
- Series: Mother
- Platforms: Super Nintendo Entertainment System; Game Boy Advance
- Release: JP: August 27, 1994; NA: June 5, 1995; Mother 1+2: JP: June 20, 2003
- Genre: Role-playing
- Mode: Single-player

EarthBound, originally released in Japan as Mother 2: Gīgu no Gyakushū, (Note: Japanese: MOTHER2ギーグの逆襲, Hepburn: Mazā Tsū: Gīgu no Gyakushū; lit. Mother 2: Giygas' Counterattack) is a 1994 role-playing video game developed by Ape Inc. (now Creatures Inc.) and HAL Laboratory and published by Nintendo for the Super Nintendo Entertainment System. The second entry in the Mother series, it follows a young boy named Ness and his party of Paula, Jeff and Poo, as they travel the world to collect melodies from eight Sanctuaries to defeat the universal cosmic destroyer Giygas.

EarthBound had a lengthy development period that spanned five years. Its returning staff from EarthBound Beginnings (1989) included writer/director Shigesato Itoi and lead programmer Satoru Iwata, as well as composers Keiichi Suzuki and Hirokazu Tanaka, who incorporated a diverse range of styles into the soundtrack, including salsa, reggae, and dub. Most of the other staff members had not worked on the original EarthBound Beginnings, and the game came under repeated threats of cancellation until Iwata joined the team. Originally scheduled for release in January 1993, the game was completed around May 1994 and first released in Japan in August 1994, and in North America in June 1995. A port for the Game Boy Advance developed by Pax Softnica, bundled with Mother, as Mother 1 + 2, was released only in Japan in 2003.

Like its predecessor, EarthBound is themed around an idiosyncratic portrayal of Americana and Western culture, subverting popular role-playing game traditions by featuring a modern setting while parodying numerous staples of the genre. Itoi wanted the game to reach non-gamers with its intentionally goofy tone; for example, the player uses items such as the Pencil Eraser to remove pencil statues (octopus statues in the Japanese version), experiences in-game hallucinations, and battles piles of vomit, taxi cabs, and walking nooses. For its American release, the game was marketed with a $2 million promotional campaign that sardonically proclaimed: "This game stinks." The game's puns and humor were reworked by localizer Marcus Lindblom. Since the original Mother had not yet been released outside Japan on the Nintendo Entertainment System before 2015, Mother 2 was called EarthBound to avoid confusion about what it was a sequel to.

Although it was positively received by Japanese audiences, EarthBound sold quite poorly in the United States. Journalists attributed the game's poor sales in the West to a combination of its simple graphics, satirical marketing campaign, and a lack of market interest in the genre. In the ensuing years, a dedicated fan community spawned that advocated for the series' recognition, particularly after Ness appeared as a playable character in the Super Smash Bros. series. By the 2000s, multiple reader polls and critics had named it one of the greatest video games of all time, and it became regarded as a "sacred cow among gaming's cognoscenti". It was followed by the Japan-only sequel Mother 3 for the Game Boy Advance in 2006. EarthBound was later made available worldwide on the Wii U Virtual Console in 2013, 3DS Virtual Console in 2016, the SNES Classic in 2017, and the Nintendo Classics service in February 2022.

== Gameplay ==
Ness, Paula, Jeff and Poo (right to left) walking the Summers beachfront

EarthBound features many traditional role-playing game elements: the player controls a party of four characters who travel through the game's two-dimensional world composed of villages, cities, caves, and dungeons. Along the way, the player fights battles against enemies and the party receives experience points for victories. If enough experience points are acquired, a character's level will increase. This pseudo-randomly increases the character's attributes, such as offense, defense, and the maximum hit points (HP) and psychic points (PP) of each character. Rather than using an overworld map screen like most console RPGs of its era, the world is entirely seamless, with no differentiation between towns and the outside world. Another non-traditional element is the perspective used for the world. The game uses oblique projection, while most 2D RPGs use a "top-down" view on a grid or an isometric perspective.

Unlike its predecessor, EarthBound Beginnings, EarthBound does not use random encounters. In EarthBound, enemies are presented similarly to other non-player characters scattered around the game's overworld. While the player can see enemy parties on-screen, the composition of the parties is randomly generated. If the party contacts an enemy from behind (indicated by a translucent green swirl that fills the screen), the player is given a first-strike priority when battle mode begins. If an enemy sneaks up on the party from behind, the swirl is red, and the enemy is given first-strike priority, though the player has a brief window to dodge. Battles with weaker enemies are won automatically, forgoing the battle sequence, and weaker monsters will flee from Ness and his friends rather than chase them.

In combat, once an enemy or character's HP reaches zero, that enemy or character is rendered unconscious. There is a chance that the party will receive an item after the battle. Battle commands include attacking, spying (reveals enemy weakness), mirroring (emulates an enemy), and running away. Characters can also use PSI actions that require PP. Once each character is assigned a command, the characters and enemies perform their actions in an order determined by character speed and a random number generator. Whenever a character receives damage, the HP box gradually "rolls" down, similar to a mechanical counter. This allows players an opportunity to heal the character or win the battle before the counter hits zero, saving the character from being rendered unconscious. (Note: If the counter reaches zero as the battle is won, it will be set to 1 HP instead, and the character will survive.) When hit with mortal damage, there is a small chance the character will survive it, being left with 1 HP, even without intervention of other characters. (Note: "If an ally has more than 1 HP and is dealt damage that would kill you, the probability of surviving with 1 HP instead is guts/500 or 1/20, whichever is greater. Enemies can't use guts to survive otherwise mortal damage, but NPCs can." starmen.net) This mechanic does not apply to enemies, for whom unconsciousness is instantaneous and can be reversed only with healing PSI. If all characters are rendered unconscious, the game transitions to an endgame screen, asking if the player wants to continue. An affirmative response brings Ness, conscious, back to the last save point, with half the money on his person at the time of his defeat, and with other party members still unconscious.

Currency is indirectly received from battles. Each time the party wins a battle, Ness's father, who can also save the game's progress, deposits money into an account that can be withdrawn at ATMs. In towns, players can buy weapons, armor, and items from stores. Weapons and armor can be equipped to increase character strength and defense, respectively. Items can be used for several purposes, such as healing. Towns also contain useful facilities such as hospitals where players can be healed for a fee.

== Plot ==
In an unknown year of the 1990s, (Note: The only reference to the year in the game is represented with "199X".) a meteorite crashes in Eagleland. In the nearby neighborhood of the crash, Ness and Pokey (Note: While named Pokey in EarthBound, he is named Porky in the Japanese version. This also applies in Mother 3. In Japanese versions of both, his name is ポーキー Pōkī.) investigate the meteorite, where they encounter a small creature called Buzz-Buzz who came from the future. Buzz-Buzz reveals that in ten years the world will be engulfed in hatred by an alien force named Giygas, transforming humans, animals, and objects into malicious creatures. Buzz-Buzz enlists Ness (Note: Players are asked to name their characters at the beginning of the game. "Ness", along with all the other names for the playable characters in this article, are the default names.) to save the world by using a "Sound Stone" to collect eight melodies kept in sanctuaries scattered around the world. However, Buzz-Buzz is accidentally killed, forcing Ness to begin alone.

Travelling through Eagleland and other places to collect the melodies, Ness comes across many events and characters. In the Happy Happy Village, Ness rescues a young girl named Paula from cultists who abuse her psychic abilities after being influenced by a Mani Mani statue created by Giygas. After falling into a trap in Threed, Paula summons child scientist Jeff, who travels from Winters with his father's flying saucer. Reaching the seaside resort Summers, Ness gains a vision of Poo, the prince of Dalaam, who joins the party after completing his "Mu Training". With his three companions, Ness successfully fills the Sound Stone.

Ness then visits Magicant, where Ness fights his personal dark side. Returning to Eagleland, the party uses the Phase Distorter to travel back in time to fight Giygas; to avoid destroying their bodies through time travel, the party transfers their souls into robots. In the ensuing confrontation with Giygas, Pokey reveals himself as his ally by using alien technology. Upon being defeated, Pokey releases Giygas, now transformed into the embodiment of evil due to his infinite power. Paula uses her psychic powers to get aid from the world through prayers, which allows the party to defeat Giygas with his fatal weaknesses: human emotions and love, while Pokey flees through time and space. Ness returns home to resume his normal life, where he receives a mocking letter from a taunting Pokey that his brother Picky found.

== Development ==
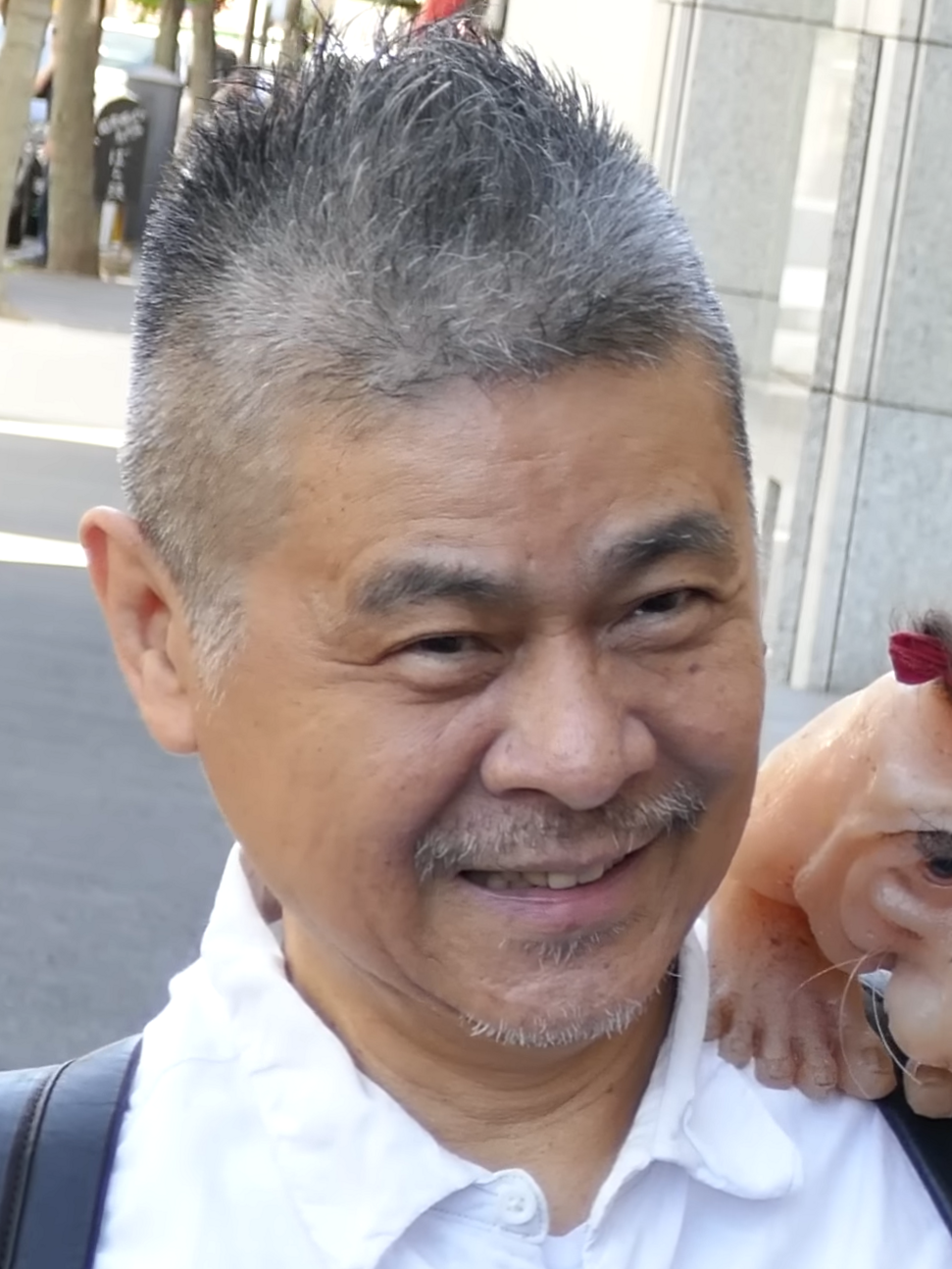
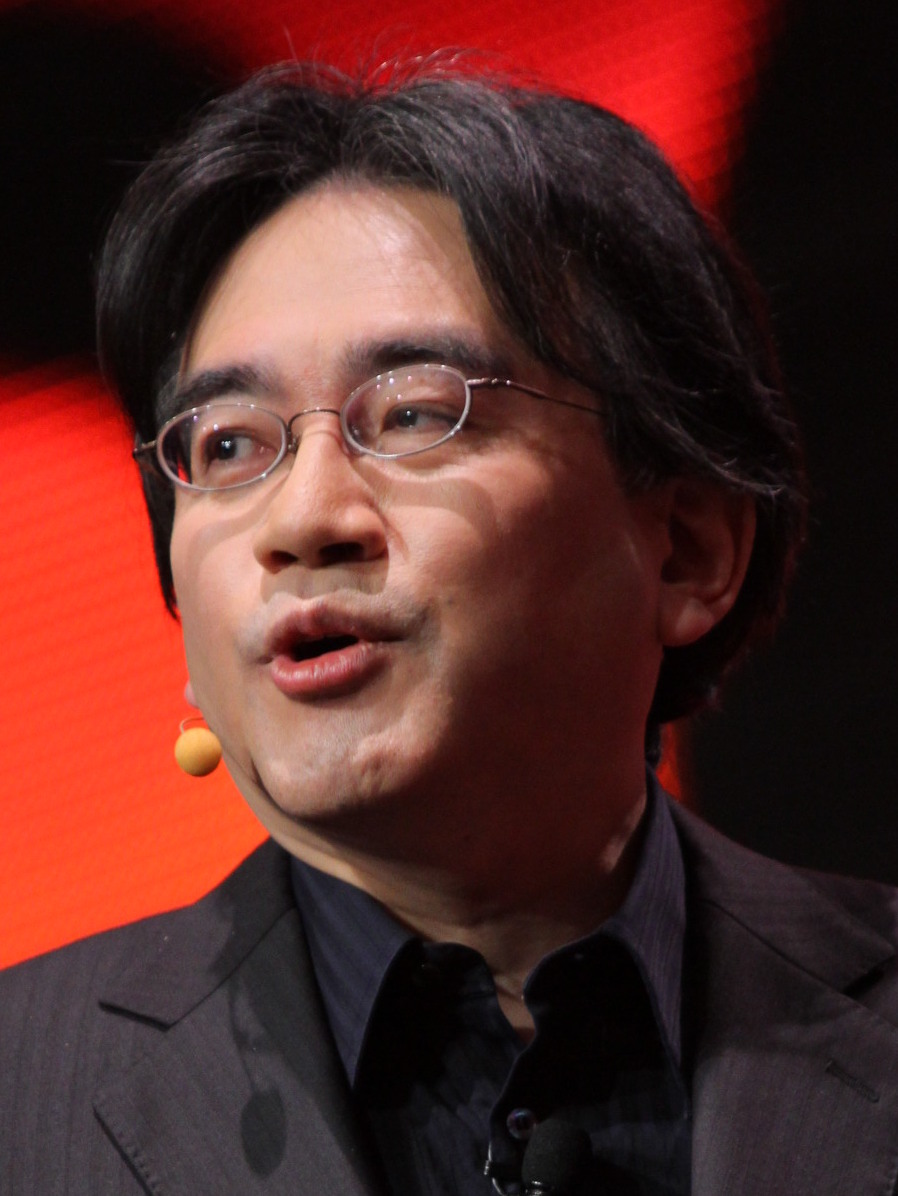
EarthBound director Shigesato Itoi in 2016 and producer Satoru Iwata in 2011

EarthBound Beginnings was released for the Famicom in 1989 in Japan. Its sequel, EarthBound, was developed over five years by Ape and HAL, and published through Nintendo. The game was written and designed by Japanese author, musician, and advertiser Shigesato Itoi, and produced by Satoru Iwata, who became Nintendo's president and CEO. Mother 2 was made with a development team different from that of the original game, and most of its members were unmarried and willing to work all night on the project. Mother 2's development took much longer than planned and came under repeated threats of cancellation. Itoi has said that the project's dire straits were resolved when Iwata joined the team. Ape's programming team had more members than HAL on the project. The HAL team (led by lead programmer Iwata) worked on the game programming, while the Ape team (led by lead programmer Kouji Malta) worked on specific data, such as the text and maps. They spent biweekly retreats together at the HAL office in view of Mount Fuji.

The game continues EarthBound Beginnings's story in that Giygas reappears as the antagonist (and thus did not die at the end of EarthBound Beginnings) and the player has the option of choosing whether to continue the protagonist's story by choosing whether to name their player-character the same as the original. He considered interstellar and interplanetary space travel instead of the confines of a single planet in the new game. After four months, Itoi scrapped the idea as cliché. Itoi sought to make a game that would appeal to populations that were playing games less, such as girls.

The Mother series titles are built on what Itoi considered "reckless wildness", where he would offer ideas that encouraged his staff to contribute new ways of portraying scenes in the video game medium. He saw the titles foremost as games and not "big scenario scripts". Itoi has said that he wanted the player to feel emotions such as "distraught" when playing the game. The game's writing was intentionally "quirky and goofy" in character, and written in the Japanese kana script to give dialogue a conversational feel. Itoi thought of the default player-character names when he did not like his team's suggestions. Many of the characters were based on real-life personalities. For instance, the desert miners were modeled on specific executives from a Japanese construction company. The final battle dialogue with Giygas was based on Itoi's recollections of a traumatic scene from the Shintoho film The Military Policeman and the Dismembered Beauty that he had accidentally seen in his childhood. Itoi referred to the battle background animations as a "video drug". The same specialist made nearly 200 of these animations, working solely on backgrounds for two years.

The idea for the rolling HP meter began with pachinko balls that would drop balls off the screen upon being hit. This did not work as well for characters with high health. Instead, around 1990, they chose an odometer-style hit points counter. The bicycle was one of the harder elements to implement—it used controls similar to a tank before it was tweaked. Iwata felt that the Ape programmers were particularly willing to tackle such challenges. The programmers also found difficulty implementing the in-game delivery service, where the delivery person had to navigate around obstacles to reach the player. They thought it would be funny to have the delivery person run through obstacles in a hurry on his way off-screen. The unusual maps laid out with diagonal streets in oblique projection required extra attention from the artists. Itoi specifically chose against having an overworld map, and didn't want to artificially distinguish between towns and other areas. Instead, he worked to make each town unique. His own favorite town was Threed, though it was Summers before then.

Mother 2 was designed to fit within an eight-megabit limit, but was expanded in size and scope twice: first to 12 megabits and second to 24 megabits. The game was originally scheduled for release in January 1993 on a 12 megabit cartridge. It was finished around May 1994 and the Japanese release was set for August 27. With the extra few months, the team played the game and added small, personal touches. Itoi told Weekly Famitsu that Shigeru Miyamoto liked the game and that it was the first role-playing game that Miyamoto had completed. Mother 2 would release in North America about a year later.

The game includes anti-piracy measures that, when triggered, increase enemy counts to raise the difficulty level. Additionally, right before players reach the end of the pirated copy's story, their game resets and deletes its saved file in an act that IGN declared "arguably the most devious and notorious example of 'creative' copy protection".

=== Music ===
Mother composers Keiichi Suzuki and Hirokazu Tanaka returned to make the EarthBound soundtrack, along with newcomers Hiroshi Kanazu and Toshiyuki Ueno. In comparison with Mother, Itoi said that EarthBound had more "jazzy" pieces. Suzuki told Weekly Famitsu that the Super NES afforded the team more creative freedom with its eight-channel ADPCM based SPC700, as opposed to the old Nintendo Entertainment System's restriction of five channels of basic waveforms. This entailed higher sound quality and music that sounds closer to his regular compositions. The soundtrack was released by Sony Records on November 2, 1994. (Note: It was later reprinted by Sony Music Direct on February 18, 2004.)

In Suzuki's songwriting process, he would first compose on a synthesizer before working with programmers to get it in the game. His personal pieces play when the player is walking about the map, out of battle. Suzuki's favorite piece is the music that plays while the player is on a bicycle, which he composed in advance of this job but found appropriate to include. He wrote over 100 pieces, but much of it was not included in the game. The team wrote enough music to fill eight megabits of the 24 megabit cartridge—equivalent to about two compact discs.

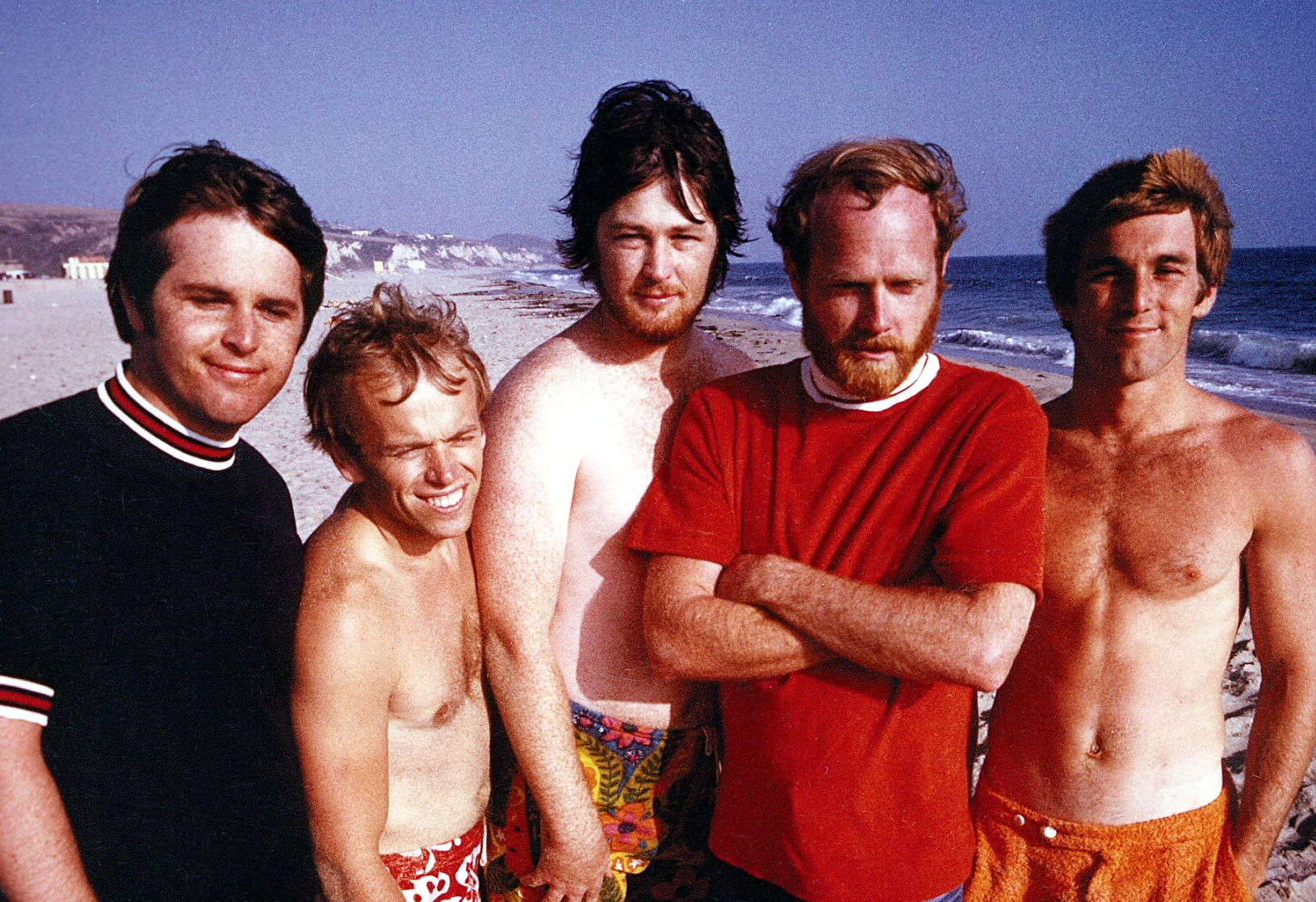
The Beach Boys were one of many Western artists Suzuki and Tanaka drew inspiration from while developing the game's soundtrack.

According to Tanaka, the Beach Boys were repeatedly referenced between him and Suzuki, and that he would often listen to co-founder Brian Wilson's 1988 eponymous album while on the way to Suzuki's home. Suzuki has stated that the percussive arranging in the game's soundtrack was based on the Beach Boys' albums Smile (unreleased) and Smiley Smile (1967), which both contained American themes shared with Van Dyke Parks' Song Cycle (1968). To Suzuki, Smile evoked the bright and dark aspects of America, while Song Cycle displayed a hazy sound mixed with American humor and hints of Ray Bradbury, a style that he considered essential to the soundtrack of Mother. (Note: Within a year following the game's release, Keiichi Suzuki recorded a cover version of the Beach Boys' "Good Vibrations" (1966), a product of the band's Smile album where Parks served as a primary lyricist.) Tanaka recalls Randy Newman being the first quintessentially American composer he could think of, and that his albums Little Criminals (1977) and Land of Dreams (1988) were influential. While Suzuki corroborated with his own affinity for Harry Nilsson's Nilsson Sings Newman (1970), he also cited John Lennon as a strong influence due to the common theme of love in his music, which was also a prominent theme in the game, and that his album John Lennon/Plastic Ono Band (1970) helped him to avoid excessive instrumentation over the SNES's technical constraints.

The soundtrack contains direct musical quotations of some classical and folk music; the composers also derived a few samples culled from other sources including commercial pop and rock music. (Note: These quotations and samples are believed to include the Beach Boys ("Deirdre"), the Beatles ("Sgt. Pepper's Lonely Hearts Club Band"), the Who ("Won't Get Fooled Again"), Antonín Dvořák (Symphony No. 9), Ric Ocasek ("This Side of Paradise"), the Doors ("The Changeling"), Bimbo Jet ("El Bimbo"), The Dallas String Band ("Dallas Rag"), "The Liberty Bell", "The Star-Spangled Banner", the Our Gang theme, "Tequila", and Chuck Berry ("Johnny B. Goode").) The texture of the work was partially influenced by some salsa, reggae, and dub music. (Note: In these sectors, Tanaka cited influence from Andy Partridge of XTC's Take Away / The Lure of Salvage (1980), Lalo Rodríguez's Un Nuevo Despertar (1988) and Fireworks (1976), King Tubby/Yabby You's King Tubby's Prophesy of Dub (1976), and the Flying Lizards' The Secret Dub Life of the Flying Lizards (1995).) Speaking about Frank Zappa's Make a Jazz Noise Here (1991), Tanaka felt that Zappa would have been the best at creating a live performance of Mother music, but could not detail Zappa's specific influence on EarthBound. Additionally, he felt that the mix tape Wired Magazine Presents: Music Futurists (1999) presented a particular selection of artists that embody the ethos of EarthBound, running the gamut from space age composer Esquivel to avant-garde trumpeter Ben Neill, along with innovators Sun Ra, Steve Reich, Todd Rundgren, Brian Eno, and Can. (Note: The compilation operates under the premise of pop artists "on the cutting edge of technology in music".) Tanaka also mentioned that he listened to the various artists compilation Stay Awake: Various Interpretations of Music from Vintage Disney Films (1988) heavily during EarthBound's development. Miscellaneous influences on Suzuki and Tanaka for EarthBound include the music of Michael Nyman, Miklós Rózsa's film score for The Lost Weekend (1945), and albums by various other pop/rock musicians. (Note: They include Prince's Around the World in a Day (1985) and Sign o' the Times (1987), Godley & Creme's Consequences (1977), A Tribe Called Quest's People's Instinctive Travels and the Paths of Rhythm (1990) and My Bloody Valentine's Loveless (1991).)

=== English localization ===
Screenshots from Mother 2 (left) and EarthBound (right). In Mother 2, Ness walks naked through his dream town Magicant. In the U.S. release, this was changed to him wearing his pajamas without his cap.

As was traditional for Nintendo, Mother 2 was developed in Japan and localized in the United States, a process in which the game is translated into English for Western audiences. As it was the only game in the Mother series to be released in North America at the time, its title "Mother 2" was changed to "EarthBound" to avoid confusion about what it was a sequel to.

Nintendo of America's Dan Owsen began the English localization project and converted about ten percent of the script before moving to another project. Marcus Lindblom filled Owsen's position around January 1995. Lindblom credits Owsen with coining some of the game's "most iconic phrases", such as "say fuzzy pickles". Lindblom himself was given liberties to make the script "as weird as [he] wanted", as Nintendo wanted the script to be more American than a direct translation would be. He worked alone and with great latitude due to no divisional hierarchies. (Note: While working alone was standard for localizers of the era, later localization efforts had full departments.) Lindblom was aided by Japanese writer Masayuki Miura, who translated the Japanese script and contextualized its tone, which Lindblom positively described as "a glass half full".

Lindblom was challenged by the task of culturally translating "an outsider's view of the U.S." for an American audience. He also sought to stay true to the original text, though he never met or spoke with Itoi. In addition to reworking the original puns and humor, Lindblom added private jokes and American cultural allusions to Bugs Bunny, comedian Benny Hill, and This Is Spinal Tap. Apart from the dialogue, he wrote the rest of the game's text, including combat, prompts and item names. As one of several Easter eggs, he named a non-player character for his daughter, Nico, who was born during development. While Lindblom took the day off for her birth, he proceeded to work 14-hour days without weekends for the next month.

Under directives from Nintendo, Lindblom worked with the Japanese artists and programmers to remove references to intellectual property, religion, and alcohol from the American release, such as a truck's Coca-Cola logo, the red crosses on hospitals, and crosses on tombstones. Alcohol became coffee or cappuccinos, Ness was no longer nude in the Magicant area as seen in the image, and the Happy Happyist blue cultists were made to look less like Ku Klux Klansmen. The team was not concerned with music licensing issues and considered itself somewhat protected under the guise of parody. Lindblom recalled that the music did not need many changes. The graphical fixes were not finished until March 1995, and the game was not fully playable until May.

== Reception ==
=== Sales and promotion ===
EarthBound's poor sales in the West were attributed to its satirical marketing campaign, based on gross-out humor.

In Japan, Mother 2 sold 518,000 units, becoming the tenth best-selling game of 1994 within the country. EarthBound was released on June 5, 1995, in North America. The game sold about 140,000 units in the United States, for a total of approximately 658,000 units sold worldwide.

Though Nintendo spent about $2 million on marketing, the American release was ultimately viewed as unsuccessful within Nintendo. The game's atypical marketing campaign was derived from the game's unusual humor. As part of Nintendo's larger "Play It Loud!" campaign, EarthBound's "this game stinks" campaign included foul-smelling scratch and sniff advertisements. GamePro reported that they received more reader complaints about the game's scratch and sniff ad than about any other 1995 advertisement.

The campaign was also expensive. It emphasized magazine advertisements and had the extra cost of the strategy guide included with each game. Between the poor sales and the phasing out of the Super NES, the game did not receive a European release. Aaron Linde of Shacknews believed that the price of the packaged game ultimately curtailed sales.

=== Contemporary ===
Contemporary reception

Review scores
Publication	Score
Famitsu	9/10, 9/10, 8/10, 8/10
Game Informer	8/10
GameFan	267/300
Super Game Power	3.5/5

Award
Publication	Award
GameFan Megawards	RPG of the Year

EarthBound originally received little critical praise from the American press, and sold poorly in the US: around 140,000 copies, as compared to twice as many in Japan. Kotaku described EarthBound's 1995 American release as "a dud" and blamed the low sales on "a bizarre marketing campaign" and graphics "cartoonish" beyond the average taste of players. The game was released when RPGs were not popular in the US, and visual taste in RPGs was closer to Chrono Trigger and Final Fantasy VI. The game piggybacked on Itoi's celebrity in Japan.

Most journalists attributed the game's poor sales in the US to its simple graphics, atypical marketing campaign, and disinterest in the genre. Of the original reviewers, Nicholas Dean Des Barres of DieHard GameFan wrote that EarthBound was not as impressive as Final Fantasy III, although just as fun. He praised the game's humor and wrote that the game completely defied his first impressions. Des Barres wrote that "past the graphics", which were purposefully 8-bit for nostalgia, the game is not an "entry-level" or a "child's" RPG, but "highly intelligent" and "captivating". The Brazilian Super GamePower explained that those expecting a Dungeons & Dragons-style RPG will be disappointed by the childish visuals, which were unlike other 16-bit games. They wrote that the American humor was too mature and that the gameplay was too immature, as if for beginners. GamePro was critical of the game's storyline and graphics, but praised the music and the humor. They concluded that the game is inappropriate for children due to its adult humor, but would not appeal to more mature gamers due to its simplistic gameplay and poorly illustrated graphics.

Lindblom and his team were devastated by the release's poor critical response and sales. He recalled that the game was hurt by the reception of its graphics as "simplistic" at a time when critics placed high importance on graphics quality. (Note: Lindblom thought reviewers viewed the game's visuals as "enhanced 8-bit graphics", which, he added, would "ironically" fit 2013's retrogaming aesthetic.) Lindblom felt that the game's changes to the RPG formula (e.g., the rolling HP meter and fleeing enemies) were ignored in the following years, though he thought the game had aged well at the time of its Virtual Console rerelease in 2013.

=== Retrospective ===
Retrospective assessments

Aggregate score
Aggregator	Score
GameRankings	88%

Review scores
Publication	Score
AllGame	4/5
GameZone	10/10
IGN	9/10
Nintendo Life	10/10
Nintendo World Report	9.5/10
Official Nintendo Magazine	90%

Reviewing the game years after its release, writers described the game as "original" or "unique", and praised its script's range of emotions. IGN's Scott Thompson said the game teetered between solemn and audacious in its dialogue and gameplay, and noted its deviance from RPG tropes in aspects such as choice of attacks in battle. He found the game both "bizarre and memorable". Official Nintendo Magazine's Simon Parkin thought the game's script was its best asset, as "one of the medium's strongest and idiosyncratic storylines" that fluctuated "between humorous and poignant". GameZone's David Sanchez thought its script was "clever" and "sharp", as it displayed a wide range of emotions that made him want to talk to all non-player characters. GamesTM wrote that the game designers spoke with their players through the non-playable characters, and noted how Itoi's interests shaped the script, its allusions to popular culture, and its "strangely existential narrative framework". Nintendo Life praised the game's touching story, charm and modern-day setting, with minor criticism of the slow pacing.

Critics praised its "real world" setting, which was seen as an uncommon choice. Thompson noted its 1990s homage as "a love letter to 20th-century Americana", with a payphone as a save point, ATMs to transfer money, yo-yos as weapons, skateboarders and hippies as enemies, and references to classic rock bands. Official Nintendo Magazine's Parkin noted the theme's distance from the "knights and dragons" common to the Japanese role-playing game genre. Thompson noted the game's steep difficulty. He wrote that the beginning was the hardest and that aspects such as limited inventory, experience grinds, and monetary penalties upon death were unfriendly for players new to Japanese RPGs. He also cited the quick respawn time for foes and ultimate need not to avoid battles given the difficulty of bosses.

Reviewers described the game's ambiance as cheery and full of charm. David Sanchez of GameZone thought the game's self-awareness added to its charm, where the player learned through the game's poking lighthearted fun. He added that the music was an "absolute delight" and complimented its range from space sounds to themes to "bizarre" battle tracks that varied with the enemy type. GamesTM wrote that the game's reputation comes from the "consistent ... visual language" in its Charles M. Schulz-esque character and world design. Kotaku's Jason Schreier found the ending unsatisfying and unrelieving, despite finding the ending credits with its character curtain call and photo album of "fuzzy pickles" moments all "wonderful".

Thompson wrote that EarthBound balances "dark Lovecraftian apocalypse and silly lightheartedness", and was just as interesting nearly a decade after its original release. While he lamented a lack of "visual feedback" in battle animations, he felt the game had innovations that still feel "smart and unique": the rolling HP meter and lack of random battles. Thompson also noted that technical issues like animation slowdown with multiple enemies on-screen went unfixed in the rerelease. Parkin found the game to provide a more potent experience than developers with more resources and thought its battle sequences were "sleek". Nintendo World Report's Justin Baker was surprised by the "excellent" battle system and controls, which he found to be underreported in other reviews despite their streamlined, grind-reducing convenience. He wrote that some of the menu interactions were clunky. GamesTM felt that the game was "far from revolutionary", compared to Final Fantasy VI and Chrono Trigger, and that its battle scenes were unexciting. The magazine compared the game's "chosen one" story to a "throwaway Link's Awakening/Goonies hybrid narrative". Thompson praised Nintendo for digitizing the Player's Guide, though noted that it was technically easier to view it on another tablet rather than switching the Wii U's view mode. Reviewers concluded that the game had aged well.

== Legacy ==
=== Acclaim and influence ===
EarthBound was listed in 1001 Video Games You Must Play Before You Die, where Christian Donlan wrote that the game is "name-checked by the video gaming cognoscenti more often than it's actually been played". He called the game "utterly brilliant" and praised its overworld and battle system. Similarly, Eurogamer's Simon Parkin described it as a "sacred cow amongst gaming's cognoscenti". Game journalists have ranked EarthBound among the best Super NES games and most essential Japanese role-playing games, and at least three reader polls ranked the game among the best of all time. For a piece about the "top worlds" in video games, IGN rated EarthBound's setting among the best, indelible between its unconventional environments, 1960s music, and portrayal of Americanism.

Kotaku described the game "as one of the weirdest, most surreal role-playing games in RPG history". Examples include using items such as the Pencil Eraser to remove pencil statues, experiencing in-game hallucinations, meeting "a man who turned himself into a dungeon", and battling piles of vomit, taxi cabs, and walking nooses. David Sanchez of GameZone wrote that EarthBound "went places no other game would" in the 1990s or even in the present day, including "trolling" the player "before trolling was cool". Localization reviewer Clyde Mandelin described the Japanese-to-English conversion as "top-notch for its time". 1UP.com said it was "unusually excellent" for the time. IGN wrote that Nintendo was "dead wrong" for believing that Americans would not be interested in "such a chaotic and satirical world". Complex included EarthBound as one of the "Best Super Nintendo Games of All Time", saying the game is "definitely the craziest and one of the most fun RPGs the SNES had to offer.

Jeremy Parish of USgamer called EarthBound "the all-time champion" of self-aware games that "warp ... perceptions and boundaries" and break the fourth wall, citing its frequent internal commentary about the medium and the final scenes where the player is directly addressed by the game. (Note: He thought the final scene was "perhaps the most clever and powerful moment in a clever and powerful game".) GamesTM said the game felt fresh because it relied on "personal experiences" made it "exactly the sort of title that would thrive today as an indie hit". He called this accomplishment "remarkable" and credited Nintendo's commitment to the "voices of creators". IGN's Nadia Oxford said that nearly two decades since the release, its final boss fight against Giygas continues to be "one of the most epic video game standoffs of all time" and noted its emotional impact. Kotaku wrote that the game was content to make the player "feel lonely", and, overall, was special not for any individual aspect but for its method of using the video game medium to explore ideas impossible to explore in media.

The few role-playing games set in real-world settings, PC Gamer has written, are often and accurately described as having been influenced by EarthBound. It was cited as an influence on video games including Costume Quest; South Park: The Stick of Truth (via South Park creator Trey Parker); Undertale; Contact; Omori; Lisa; Citizens of Earth; YIIK: A Postmodern RPG; the webcomic Homestuck; and Kyoto Wild. Japanese writer Hiromi Kawakami told Itoi that she had played EarthBound "about 80 times".

=== Fandom ===
A cult following for EarthBound developed after the game's release. Colin Campbell of Polygon wrote that "few gaming communities are as passionate and active" as EarthBound's, and 1UP.com's Bob Mackey wrote that no game was as poised to have a cult following. IGN's Lucas M. Thomas wrote in 2006 that EarthBound's "persistent", "ambitious", and "religiously dedicated collective of hardcore fans" would be among the first groups to influence Nintendo's decision-making through their purchasing power on Virtual Console. Digital Trends's Anthony John Agnello wrote that "no video game fans have suffered as much as EarthBound fans", and cited Nintendo's reluctance to release Mother series games in North America. IGN described the series as neglected by Nintendo in North America for similar reasons. Nintendo president Satoru Iwata later credited the community response on their online Miiverse social platform as leading to EarthBound's eventual rerelease on their Virtual Console platform. Physical copies of EarthBound were hard to find before the rerelease, and in 2013, were worth twice its initial retail price.

Wired described the amount of EarthBound "fan art, videos, and tributes on fan sites like EarthBound Central or Starmen.net as mountainous. Reid Young of Starmen.net and Fangamer credits EarthBound's popularity to its "labor of love" nature, with a "double-coat of thoughtfulness and care" across all aspects of the game by a development team that appeared to love their work. Young started the fansite that would become Starmen.net in 1997 while in middle school. It became "the definitive fan community for EarthBound on the web" and had "almost inexplicable" growth. Shacknews described the site's collection of fan-made media as "absolutely massive". It also provided a place to aggregate information on the Mother series and to coordinate fan actions.

The EarthBound fan community at Starmen.net coalesced with the intent to have Nintendo of America acknowledge the Mother series. The community drafted several thousand-person petitions for specific English-language Mother series releases, but in time, their request shifted to no demand at all, wanting only their interest to be recognized by Nintendo. A 2007 campaign for a Mother 3 English localization led to the creation of a full-color, 270-page art book—The EarthBound Anthology—sent to Nintendo and press outlets as demonstration of consumer interest. Shacknews called it more of a proposal than a collection of fan art, and "the greatest gaming love letter ever created". Upon "little" response from Nintendo, they decided to localize the game themselves. Starmen.net co-founder and professional game translator Clyde "Tomato" Mandelin led the project from its November 2006 announcement to October 2008 finish. They then printed a "professional quality strategy guide" through Fangamer, a video game merchandising site that spun off from Starmen.net. Unlicensed EarthBound-themed merchandise produced by Fangamer contributors included T-shirts, a pin set and a mug; The Verge cited the effort as proof of the fan base's dedication.

Other fan efforts include EarthBound, USA, a full-length documentary on Starmen.net and the fan community, and Mother 4, a fan-produced sequel to the Mother series that went into production when Itoi definitively "declared" that he was done with the series. After following the fan community from afar, Lindblom came out to fans in mid-2012, and the press became interested in his work. He had planned a book about the game's development, release, and fandom before a reply from Nintendo discouraged him from pursuing the idea. He plans to continue to communicate directly with the community about the game's history. (Note: For instance, Lindblom rejected a popular, or infamous, "abortion theory": that the game's final sequence is a metaphor for an abortion, with Giygas as the fetus. He also provided a floppy disk whose recovered data provided extra context into the game's development errata.) Books that have been written about EarthBound include Ken Baumann's Earthbound, by Boss Fight Books, and Legends of Localization Book 2: Earthbound, by Clyde Mandelin.

=== Ness ===
A variety of merchandise depicting Ness have been produced by Nintendo; this merchandise includes a figurine and an Amiibo. Ness became widely known for his appearance as a playable character throughout the Super Smash Bros. fighting game series, debuting as a fighter in the first installment in 1999. Ness's inclusion in the original release was among its biggest surprises, (Note: Ness's original Super Smash Bros. spot was actually intended for Mother 3 protagonist Lucas, but the developers later fit Ness into the character design when Mother 3 was delayed.) and renewed Mother series fans' faith in new content from Nintendo. Ness was one of the game's most powerful characters, according to IGN, if players could perfect his odd controls and psychic powers. In Europe, which did not see an EarthBound release, Ness was better known for his role in the fighting game than for his original role in the role-playing game.

Ness returned in the first sequel, Melee, alongside an EarthBound-themed item and battle arena. (Note: Melee players toss Mr. Saturn items at enemies, and fight in an arena based on the EarthBound city of Fourside.) Lucas, the protagonist of Mother 3, joined Ness in Brawl. (Note: Brawl also contains the final area from Mother 3 along with items and characters from the game, and a boss fight against Mother 3's antagonist, Porky.) Several years after Brawl's release, Official Nintendo Magazine wrote that Ness was an unpopular Smash character who should be removed from future installments. However, Ness returned in Super Smash Bros. for Nintendo 3DS and Wii U and Ultimate, and Lucas was later added to the former as downloadable content.

=== Sequels and rereleases ===
In 1996, Nintendo announced a sequel to EarthBound for the Nintendo 64: Mother 3 (EarthBound 64 in North America). It was scheduled for release on the 64DD, a Nintendo 64 expansion peripheral that used a magneto-optical drive, but struggled to find a firm release date as its protracted development entered development hell. It was later canceled altogether in 2000 when the 64DD flopped. In April 2003, a Japanese television advertisement revealed that both Mother 3 and a combined Mother 1+2 cartridge were in development for the handheld Game Boy Advance. Mother 3 abandoned the Nintendo 64 version's 3D, but kept most of its plot. It became a bestseller upon its Japanese release in 2006, yet did not receive a North American release on the basis that it would not sell. IGN described the series as neglected by Nintendo in North America, as EarthBound Beginnings, Mother 1+2 and Mother 3 were not released outside Japan.

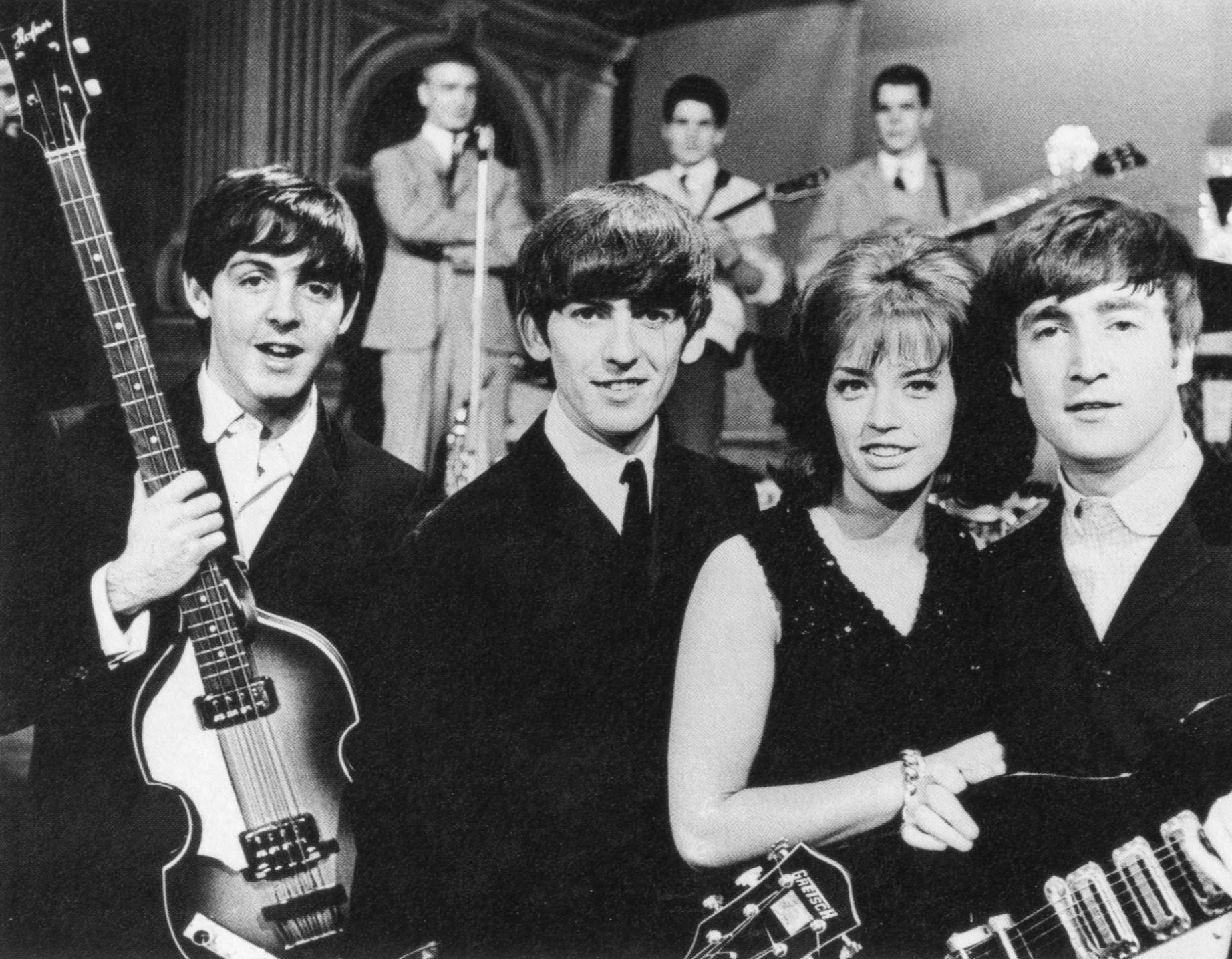
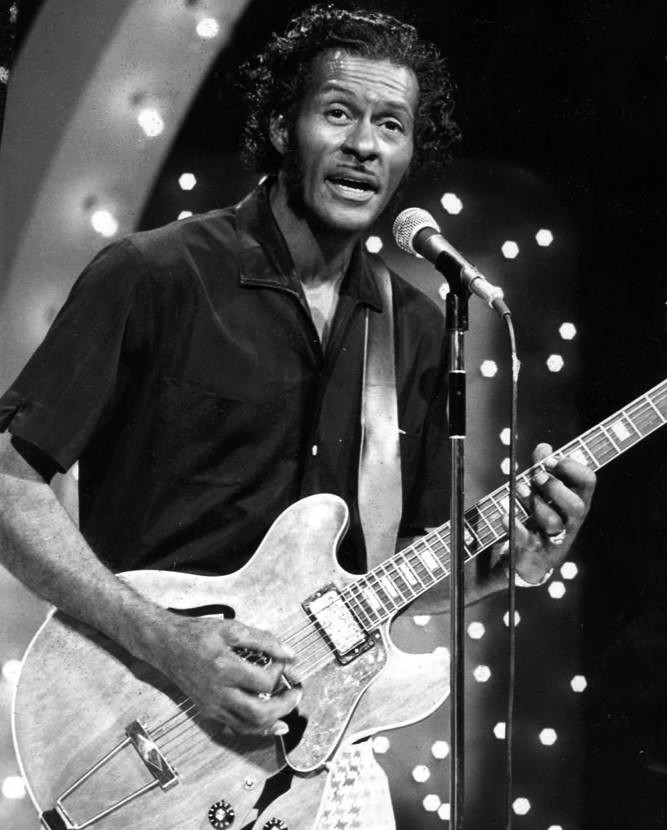
Fans incorrectly suspected music licensing issues from artists such as the Beatles and Chuck Berry had impeded EarthBound's re-release.

When Nintendo launched its digital distribution platform, Virtual Console, for the Wii in 2006, IGN expected EarthBound to be among Nintendo's highest priorities for rerelease, given the "religious" dedication of its fanbase. Though the game was ranked the most desired Virtual Console release by Nintendo Power readers, rated for release by the ESRB, and able to be published with little effort, the Wii version did not materialize. Many fans believed that music licensing or legal concerns impeded the rerelease. English localizer Marcus Lindblom doubted that the game's music samples were an issue, since they were not a concern during development, and instead hypothesized that Nintendo did not realize the magnitude of the game's popular support and did not consider it a priority project. By 2008, it was not apparent that Nintendo of America was considering a rerelease. At the end of 2012, Itoi revealed that the re-release was moving forward, which was confirmed in a January 2013 Nintendo Direct presentation.

As part of the anniversary celebrations for the Nintendo Entertainment System and Mother 2 in March 2013, Nintendo rereleased EarthBound for Japan on the Wii's successor, the Wii U Virtual Console. EarthBound producer Satoru Iwata soon announced a wider rerelease, citing fan interest on Nintendo's Miiverse social platform. The July American and European launch included a free, online recreation of the game's original Player's Guide, optimized for viewing on the Wii U GamePad. The game was a top-seller on the Wii U Virtual Console, and both Kotaku users and first-time EarthBound players had an "overwhelmingly positive" response to the game. Simon Parkin wrote that its re-release was a "momentous occasion" as the return of "one of Nintendo's few remaining lost classics" after 20 years. The re-release was one GameSpot editor's game of the year, and Nintendo Life's Virtual Console game of the year. The New Nintendo 3DS-specific Virtual Console received the re-release the next year, in March 2016. In September 2017, Nintendo released the Super NES Classic Edition, which included EarthBound among its games. Japan's version of the console, however, did not include the game.

In February 2022, Nintendo rereleased EarthBound worldwide on the Nintendo Classics service along with its predecessor EarthBound Beginnings.
