= Mother 3 fan translation =

2006 video game translation

This disclaimer screen is the only original image added to the game in the fan translation.

The Mother 3 fan translation is a complete English-language localization of the 2006 Japanese video game Mother 3 by members of the EarthBound fan community led by Clyde "Tomato" Mandelin. The original game was released in Japan after a decade of development hell. When fan interest in an English localization went unanswered, members of the EarthBound fansite Starmen.net announced their own fan translation in November 2006.

The dozen fans who worked on the project had been vetted by Tomato and had prior localization experience. Thousands of hours were put into the project between hacking the game data and translating the 1,000 pages of scripted dialogue. They built their own tools for the work. The completed version was released in October 2008 and issued as a patch. The patch was downloaded over 100,000 times in its first week. A fan-made, full-color, 200-page, professional-quality player's guide was released alongside the translation.

== Fan community ==
After a decade of "delays, downgrades, and cancellations", Mother 3 was released in April 2006 for Japanese audiences. It is the Game Boy Advance sequel to the 1995 Super NES video game EarthBound, titled Mother 2 in Japan. The American EarthBound fan community, in support of the series, had rallied support via events and petitions for the release. One such petition used custom petition software and hand-checked name verification, and the 819 pages of 31,000 signatures were sent to Nintendo's Japanese and American offices with fan art. Though receiving the backing of the wider gaming community, Nintendo did not respond. In turn, the new release became a "rallying point" for the community. 1UP.com wrote that "no other game in the history of time garnered such a rabid demand for translation".

The fan community did not expect an official English localization when Mother 3 was released in April 2006. Four months later, they received news that Nintendo was not interested, and in November, received confirmation in an interview with Nintendo of America's "Treehouse" localization group. Within days, the fan translation was announced at EarthBound community site Starmen.net. Reid Young, a co-founder of the site, said that a fan translation "was as much about the fans as it was about the game".

== Development ==
The Mother 3 fan translation project was announced in November 2006. Led by Clyde "Tomato" Mandelin, a professional game translator whose previous work included anime such as Dragon Ball, a group of around a dozen individuals translated the game from Japanese to English in a process that took two years and thousands of work-hours. Those who worked on the localization were largely already known for their contributions to other fan translations, and Tomato's own experience in the fan translation community helped the project get the necessary resources. Tomato worked on the project as "a second full-time job" in addition to his full-time job as a translator. Young, who did public relations for the project and had little involvement in the process, estimated Tomato to have put over 1,000 hours into the project, Jeffman to have nearly 1,000, and even the smallest contributors to have put between 50 and 100 hours into the project, though no one tracked hours. The team chose to not alter the game aside from adding a new intro screen, which meant not adding their names to the credits. The localization included two elements: hacking the game data (ROM) and translating the scripted dialogue.

The ROM hacking entailed assembly-level changes to the game code. Young equated the process to teaching someone another language by slowly altering their DNA bit by bit, through trial and error. Some of the technical changes included proportional fonts, graphics hacks, and custom software. The game was coded in such a way that there was not enough system memory available to display the requisite onscreen text. Since Japanese characters all occupy the same amount of space (monospaced), the team had to custom-code the new English characters to fit properly. Tomato said that "no text display routine wound up untouched", such that the fixes for variable width fonts were useless until the team manually made room for the characters. Graphics hacks included the new intro screen and images imported from the English EarthBound, so as to preserve continuity of features. For example, an octopus statue pun from Mother 2 was converted to a pencil statue in the EarthBound English localization and was changed accordingly in the Mother 3 localization. The team also built custom software to aid in the translation, such as a cross-assembler and tools for handling the script and patching. Members of the hacking team included Tomato, Jeffman, byuu, and sblur.

About 1,000 pages of text were translated, which Young described as large by most standards, including that of other RPGs. They estimated the theoretical freelance cost of the translation at $30,000. Young described Tomato as a perfectionist, and said that he kept the translation team small so as not to bog down progress, though he did request group input for aspects such as pun translation, where more input was seen to be helpful. Translation decisions included renaming the character Yokuba (similar to the Japanese word for "greed") to Fassad (similar to the Arabic word fasād فساد, "corruption", and to the English word "facade"), and changing mice characters from a Japanese dialect to a thick Cockney English dialect.

The team reported that "the highest levels" of Nintendo of America knew about their project, though they did not intervene. In February 2007, Nintendo of America president Reggie Fils-Aimé said that he had heard about the translation project. Young said that their localization team transparently stated that they would curb the project if the company were to make an announcement about the future of the game. Though the team acknowledged that the legality of the localization was unclear, Young said that it would not be reasonable to call the fan translation "impetuous or unfair". The team added that they were against software piracy. They directed others to import the game from Japan or otherwise purchase official merchandise when the game left publication, with the ultimate aim to help the franchise. Tomato received encouragement from a Square Enix employee who anticipated the translation. At the end of the project, the team said that the fan translation might lead to more protections preventing fan translations rather than more encouragement, so as to maximize the underserved audience created by lack of a localization. Tomato said that he was unable to appreciate his work since it was so familiar to him, with every original and translated line memorized. He expected that would change in five years. The project gave Tomato a greater respect for the craft of writing.

== Release ==
The localization patch was finished in October 2008. Though Tomato predicted the game would have "a couple dozen thousand downloads total", it was downloaded more than 100,000 times in its first week, not including downloads from other locations. The patch requires a ROM image file of the game to be used. Along with the translation, the team announced the Mother 3 Handbook, an English player's guide for the game that had been in development since June 2008. Wired reported the full-color, 200-page player's guide to be akin to a professional strategy guide, with quality "on par with ... Prima Games and BradyGames". Tomato released updated versions of the patch in 2009, 2014 and 2021. The patch is undergoing translation into languages including French, Italian, and Spanish, with translation tools released in 2014.

== Reception ==
Frank Caron of Ars Technica wrote that the "massive undertaking ... stands as a massive success" and that the fan translation realized the dreams of many gamers including himself. He added that "one cannot even begin to fathom" why Nintendo would not release their own English localization. Kotaku's Mike Fahey wrote that the translators were wrong to suggest purchasing official merchandise where players were unable to find an import copy to justify piracy. The Verge cited the two-year fan translation of Mother 3 as proof of the fanbase's dedication. Dustin Bailey of GamesRadar+ called the translation "excellent".
