= Catalyst (disambiguation) =

A catalyst is a substance which changes the rate of a chemical reaction.

Catalyst may also refer to:

== Buildings ==
- Catalyst (building), a high-rise in Charlotte, North Carolina
- Catalyst (museum), a hands-on science centre and chemical industry museum in Widnes in Cheshire in England
- The Catalyst (nightclub), a music venue in Santa Cruz, California

== Economics and finance ==
- Economic catalyst
- Stock catalyst

== Events ==
- Catalyst Conference, an annual nondenominational Christian event

== Media and entertainment ==
=== Games ===
- Catalyst (role-playing game supplements), a series of fantasy role-playing game supplements
- Catalyst, an indie role-playing game published by Cherry Picked Games in 2015
- The Catalyst, a fictional character in Mass Effect 3
- Catalyst, a playable character in the video game 2019 Apex Legends

=== Literature and publications ===
- Catalyst, a left-wing scholarly journal published by Jacobin
- Catalyst (magazine), published by the RMIT University Student Union
- Catalyst (novel), by Laurie Halse Anderson
- Catalyst, fourth book in Fletcher DeLancey's Chronicles of Alsea series
- The Catalyst (Doctor Who audio), a 2008 Doctor Who audiobook
- The Catalyst (American newspaper), an American weekly newspaper
- The Catalyst (Philippine newspaper), the official student publication of the Polytechnic University of the Philippines
- Catalyst, a freesheet of the Solidarity Federation
- Catalyst, a magazine published by the Commission for Racial Equality in the United Kingdom
- Catalyst, a publication of the Union of Concerned Scientists
- The Catalyst, a science fiction novel by Charles L. Harness
- Catalyst, the journal of the Catholic League for Religious and Civil Rights
- Catalyst: A Rogue One Novel, a direct prequel novel to the 2016 film Rogue One: A Star Wars Story

=== Music ===
- Catalyst (New Found Glory album), 2004
- Catalyst (Prototype album), 2012
- Catalyst (band), an American funk-jazz band
- "The Catalyst", a 2010 song by Linkin Park
- The Catalyst (album), a 2024 studio album by Amaranthe
- The Catalyst, a 2017 studio album by Neurotech

=== Television and film ===
- Catalyst (1990 TV program), an Australian science and technology television series
- Catalyst (TV program), an Australian science journal
- "Catalysts" (The Spectacular Spider-Man), an episode of the animated television series The Spectacular Spider-Man
- Catalyst, a BBC Two television ident first aired in 2000 (see BBC Two '1991–2001' idents)

== Organizations ==
- Catalyst (nonprofit organization), an organization that promotes inclusive workplaces for women
- Catalyst (science park), Northern Ireland
- Catalyst (think tank), a socialist left political think tank based in London, United Kingdom
- Catalyst Paper, a Canadian paper mill company
- Catalyst Technologies, one of the first company incubators, founded by Nolan Bushnell

== Technology ==
- Catalyst (software), a web application framework
- Alchemy Catalyst, an Internationalization and localization tool
- AMD Catalyst, formerly ATI Catalyst, a software suite for graphic cards
- Cisco Catalyst, a line of network switches
- General Electric Catalyst, a turboprop aircraft engine under development by GE Aviation
- Catalyst, a line of automatic test equipment produced by Teradyne
- AudioCatalyst, a software package from Xing Technology
- Gentoo Catalyst, a tool to create Gentoo Linux environments
- Mac Catalyst, a software development tool for macOS

== See also ==
- Catalist, an American corporation
- Catalytic converter, a device in modern vehicles to reduce emissions
- Katalyst (disambiguation)
- Qatalyst Group, a corporate advisory firm
