= Video game localization =

Process in development of video games

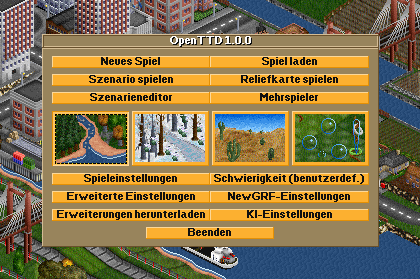
Menu of the Swedish video game OpenTTD localized to German

Video game localization (or computer game localisation) is the process of preparing a video game for a market outside of where it was originally published. The game's name, art assets, packaging, manuals, and cultural and legal differences are typically altered.

Before localization, producers consider economic factors such as potential foreign profit. Most official localizations are done by the game's developers or a third-party translation company. Nevertheless, fan localizations are also popular.

Localization is largely inconsistent between platforms, engines and companies due to its recency. Localizers intend to create an experience like the original game, with discretion to the localization audience. Localizations are considered to have failed if they are confusing or difficult to understand and this may break the player's immersion.

== History ==
Since the beginning of video game history, video games have been localized. One of the first widely popular video games, Pac-Man was localized from Japanese. The original transliteration of the Japanese title would be "Puck-Man", but the decision was made to change the name when the game was imported to the United States out of fear that the word 'Puck' would be vandalized into an obscenity. In addition, the names of the ghosts were originally based on colors – roughly translating to "Reddie", "Pinky", "Bluey", and "Slowly". Rather than translate these names exactly, they were renamed to Blinky, Pinky, Inky, and Clyde. This choice maintained the odd-man-out style of the original names without adhering to their exact meaning. This is an early example of a change in cultural context.

Early localization had one main concern. Due to the small memory size of the NES and SNES cartridges many translated text strings were too long. Ted Woolsey, translator of Final Fantasy VI, recounts having to continually cut down the English text due to limited capacity.

Early video game translation was not often a priority for companies, leading to budgets being low and localization time being cut short. Early translations were sometimes "literally done by a 'programmer with a phrase book'". For example, the original translation for the Sega Genesis game Beyond Oasis was discarded as the editor considered it nonsensical and an entirely new story was rewritten without any input from the translator. Occasionally the poor translation of video games has made the game notable. An example of this is with the game Zero Wing whose Engrish text "All Your Base Are Belong to Us" became an early Internet meme.

As technology in the early 2000s improved, localization was made both easier and harder. These improvements made in technology allowed text to be stored in ASCII strings instead of in picture format. Audio processing capability also improved allowing voice acting to be included in video games. The addition of dubbing into video games made the localization process harder and localization producers had to choose if they wanted to record entirely new voice lines or keep the original voice over. Graphical capability also improved making games more cinematic, so making sure the newly recorded voice lines matched the lip movements of the characters was important. Also, ensuring that visual gestures of animated characters made sense to a different audience was important.

Modern video games are becoming increasingly complex in scope. As opposed to their older counterparts, video games can have a large amount of dialogue and voice over, making localization efforts significantly harder. The team in charge of localizing Fable II into five languages consisted of 270 actors and 130 personnel. Likewise, the dialogue scripts for Star Wars: The Old Republic contained over 200,000 lines. Director of audio and localization Shauna Perry said that the game had as much audio as ten Knights of the Old Republic recorded back-to-back.

== Styles of localization ==
There are many styles of localizing a video game. "No localization" is when a game is released in an overseas territory with little to no effort to localize the game. "Box and documentation localization" is when only the manuals and box are translated into the target language, but the game itself is not. This style is mostly chosen if the game is an arcade game or if the target country is expected to decently know the original language. In partial localization, the game's text is translated, but voice-over files are not re-recorded. This style is popular with many new Japanese role-playing games and visual novels. Full localization is when all assets of a game are translated and all voice-over is recorded in the target language. This option is usually undertaken by AAA game companies.

Academics in translation studies describe four primary methods for translating video games: foreignization (keeping a "foreign taste"), domestication (translating as game to suit characteristics and cultural standards of the destination), no translation (leaving parts of the game in the source language), and transcreation (creating a new text in the destination language).

== Production models ==
Officially produced localizations generally fit into one of two categories: "Post-gold" or "Sim-ship". Post-gold means that the game has been released and completed. This usually means there is a gap of time between the release of a localized version and original. The post-gold model allows the producers of a localization to access and play the fully completed game, generally allowing more time to work on and complete a thorough translation. This model was commonly used by Japanese AAA producers, but these companies are now moving towards the sim-ship style.

The other main model is "Sim-ship". This is when a localization is produced before the original game has been released. This method is more viable as games are prone to be pirated at release so there is a profit incentive to releasing this way. Though being crucial to maintain a good release window and leave games less prone to piracy, Sim-ship has its drawbacks. When localizing with this model, a completed game is unlikely to be ready. This results in a few risks for the continuity of the game, since a lot of the crucial context and information needed may be missing. Most western games follow this model.

There are two means to go about making a localization that follow one of each of these models: outsourced or in-house. Most game companies in North America and Europe rely on outsourcing as a means of localization. This model is also popular in emerging video game markets such as Chile, Russia, and China. When outsourced, a company that specializes in producing localization is hired to undertake the process. An issue that arises with an outsourced localization is that the company lacks knowledge of the game, as opposed to in-house developers. A localization that arises from the lack of knowledge about the game is commonly known as a "blind localization".

If a localization is outsourced, the developers will usually provide the outsourced company with a localization kit. A localization kit may contain elements such as general information about the project (including deadlines, contact information, software details), resources about the game itself (a walk-through, plot or character descriptions, cheat codes), reference materials (glossaries of terms used in the game world or used for the specific hardware), software (such as computer-aided translation tools), code, and the assets to be translated.

Companies may choose to localize in-house. This practice is common for Japanese developers, most notably Square Enix. When localized in-house, the process is completely controlled by the original developers. Although it is common practice to hire freelance translators to work alongside the development team, in-house producers usually have greater access to the original game and to the original artists and authors, who can be consulted about changing art assets or story concerns. Since Japanese companies prefer the post-gold method, in-house translation is favored. In-house productions usually have fewer mistakes and an overall smoother localization. The downside is that this causes a delay between the release of the international and home versions.

Another means of localization is through the unauthorized effort of fans. Fans of video games without an international release may be willing to put unpaid effort into localizing a game if the game is not released internationally. The most notable example of this is the Mother 3 (2006) localization into English. Fans attempted a petition to Nintendo to localize the game into English, and when this failed they undertook the process themselves. Sometimes, fan interest and fanmade localization is used as a metric of interest. For example, when The Great Ace Attorney was only released in Japan and fans localized it into other languages upon release, it was clear to Capcom that there was enough interest in their game to warrant an international release with an official localization.

When a game is released with a fan-deemed "inferior translation", or the game has been "blindly translated", it can prompt fan action to correct or completely re-do the process of localization. A fan group called DLAN has undertaken the work of localizing many games, mods, cheats, guides, and more into Castilian Spanish when the official versions were of poor quality, such as with The Elder Scrolls IV: Oblivion.

== Tasks and challenges ==
The major types of localization are as follows:

- Linguistic and cultural: the translation of language and cultural references maintaining the feel of the game but making it more appealing for the receiving locale.
- Hardware and software: for example the change between PAL and NTSC, re-mapping of hotkeys, gameplay modifications.
- Legal: age ratings may differ depending on the country of release. They are controlled by national or international bodies like PEGI (for Europe), ESRB (for US and Canada), ACB (for Australia), or CERO (for Japan).
- Graphics and music: some games may exhibit different characters, or the same ones with a slightly different appearance in order to facilitate players identification with their avatar. Music may also vary according to national trends or the preferences of major fan communities.

Localization can be affected by the space on the screen allocated for text, which is often set based on the source language. This can include game elements such as dialogue, signage, captions, or narrative. German is an example of a destination language that presents difficulties due to length the constraints of screen space.

When games are more story-driven than action-driven, culturalising them can be challenging because of all the premises the designers are taking for granted in the development of the plot. Asian gamers seem to prefer more childlike characters, while Western countries might emphasize adult features. An example of the changes that are likely to happen during localization is the first Fatal Frame game (known in Japan as Zero and known in Europe as Project Zero). In the original Japanese version the protagonist, Miku Hinasaki, was a frightened seventeen-year-old girl looking for her brother Mafuyu who disappeared after entering a haunted mansion. In the US and European versions Miku is nineteen, has Western features, and is not wearing the original Japanese school uniform, but developers did not think necessary to change her brother's appearance, so when players do find Mafuyu at the end of the game they do not seem to be blood-related. While most games only need small changes to be localized for another region, there are also games that had to be thematically overhauled for a new region. For example, efforts to localize the Nintendo DS rhythm game Osu! Tatakae! Ouendan for the western world led to a completely new and thematically different game, Elite Beat Agents, which reuses Ouendan's gameplay but is re-themed to feature special agents helping people around the world instead of oendan cheering people in Japan, due to Ouendan's innate reliance on Japanese culture making a plain localization of that game unviable.

A similar thing happens with the depiction of blood, and real historical events; many things have to be readjusted to fit the country's tolerance and taste in order not to hurt sensibilities. This is probably one of the reasons why so many games take place in imaginary worlds. This customization effort draws on the knowledge of geopolitical strategists, like Kate Edwards from Englobe. During the 2006 Game Developers Conference in California she explained the importance of being culturally aware when internationalizing games in a presentation called "Fun vs. Offensive: Balancing the 'Cultural Edge' of Content for Global Games". Both developers and publishers want to please their clients. Gamers are not particularly interested in where the game comes from, or who created it any more than someone buying a new car or DVD player. A product for mass consumption only keeps the branding features of the trademark; all the other characteristics might be subject to customization due to the need to appeal to the local market. Therefore, the translation will be in some cases an actual recreation, or, in the words of Mangiron & O'Hagan (2006), a "transcreation", where translators will be expected to produce a text with the right "feel" for the target market. It is important for translators to be aware of the logic behind this. Video games are a software product, and as such, they will have manuals and instructions, as well as interactive menus and help files. This will call for technical translation. On the other hand, players also find narration and dialogue closer to literary texts or film scripts where a more creative translation would be expected, but unlike most forms of translation, video games can adapt or even change the original script, as long as it is in the search of enhanced fun and playability of the target culture. Players only find a parallel of this type of practice in the translation of children's literature where professionals often adapt or alter the original text to improve children's understanding and enjoyment of the book.

David Reeves of SCEE said that the main reason that Europe is often affected by significant content delays is because of language localization and "that there isn't enough incentive for developers to work on multiple language translations during development. Hence, Europeans suffer delays and may never see a particular title". He also commented on why the UK and Ireland, which are English speaking countries, also experience the same delays as those in continental Europe with many different languages despite little or no modification. In his words: "With PlayStation Store we could probably go in the UK almost day and date. But then what are the Germans and the French going to say to me? That I'm Anglo-centric", indicating that the reason that these countries also must wait is to avoid criticism from other large European gaming countries such as Germany and France.

== Cultural changes ==
Often localization changes include adjusting a game to consider specific cultural sensitivities. These changes may be self-enforced by the developers themselves, or enacted by national or regional rating boards (video game content rating system), but the games are still sometimes released with controversial or insensitive material, which can lead to controversy or recall of the product.

Games localized for import into Germany often have significant changes made due to the Unterhaltungssoftware Selbstkontrolle's (USK) strict policies against blood and gore, profanity, and symbols associated with racial hatred, such as Nazi symbolism (until 2019). For instance, the German version of Team Fortress 2 (2007) has no blood or detached body parts as a result of this regulation, which can cause difficulty for players as it is hard to tell if an enemy has been hit or taken damage. As a result, mods known as "bloodpatches" have been created for this and many German games that allow the blood and gore of the original game to be unlocked. Despite a significant overhaul of the graphics, the German localization of the World War II game Wolfenstein (2009) contained a single visible swastika on an art asset. As a result, Raven Software recalled the game.

China also has strict censorship rules, and forbids content that endangers the "unity, sovereignty and territorial integrity of the state" or the "social moralities or fine national cultural traditions", amongst other qualifications. As a result, the Swedish PC game Hearts of Iron (2002), set during World War II, was banned because maps depicted Manchuria, West Xinjiang, and Tibet as independent states. Additionally, Taiwan was shown to be a territory of Japan, as was accurate for the time period, but these inclusions were considered harmful to China's territorial integrity, so the game was forbidden from being legally imported. The localization of Football Manager (2005) was similarly banned because Tibet, Taiwan, Hong Kong, and China were all treated as separate teams, putting them on equal footing.

Other localization challenges or controversies arise from material deemed too sexual for the cultural expectations of the target market. For example, when the Japanese game Xenoblade Chronicles X was localized for the North American market, the options to change a protagonist's bust size was removed, as were clothing options including bikinis. This resulted in complaints from American players who had been playing the Japanese version.

Some translators of video games favor glocalization over the process of localization. In this context, glocalization seeks from the outset to minimize localization requirements for video games intended to be universally appealing. Academic Douglas Eyman cites the Mists of Pandaria expansion for World of Warcraft as an example of glocalization because it was designed at the outset to appeal to global audiences while celebrating Chinese culture.

== Linguistic assets ==
In video games there are a number of different types of texts that require translation. These can be manuals, subtitles and dubbing scripts. There is another type of script that poses an issue to developers of localization. This type of script is in a format common with software like web browsers or word processors. Utility programs like this have a commonality with each other because a user can input any text into it. This is referred to as "interactivity". The interactive element of this type of text makes it difficult for producers of localization because it has an aspect of randomness, for example a user may have to input a command or a message at a certain point. The random nature of this takes away linearity and contextual information that a game has. As a result of this, translators do not have important sources in the translation process and loose both co-text and context in text. When the game is unfinished or an inadequate localization kit has been supplied the team must look elsewhere to draw from. There are many resources which they use to do this.

Due to the differences between each of the ways a video game can be produced, there is no standard localization tool that producers use. In modern games it is able to do this in the game engine but older titles do not have this. There are multiple programs that can be used, most popular being Catalyst and Passolo, which allow producers to work directly with the game code.

Producers of localizations deal with a variety of different linguistic assets, which include the game itself, the official website, promotional articles, game updates and patches.

== Textual types and file formats ==
In a video game there are various types of text. Video games are also multimedia including a variety of different assets like video. Producers of localization's have to be knowledgeable in dealing with these. When dealing with cut-scenes or pre-rendered video, producers have to put effort into ensuring these stay relatively unchanged. The most important challenge is the lip-syncing of newly recorded dialogue, and fitting the subtitles into each part of a pre-recorded or pre-rendered scene. The types of text and files that are commonly found in video games are as follows:

- An instruction manual is a document that outlines important details relating to the purchased video game. These can be instructions on how to use the game, a guide on how to complete the game and other information like corporate and legal texts.
- Packaging can include the slip inserted into the DVD or CD case the video game comes in, or before optical disks were adopted in gaming, the box that a game came in. Packaging usually features the title of a game, its rating and logos of companies involved. It also features pictures and other points of information relating to a game. The manual is usually found within the packaging.
- A Readme file is a file usually included with digital video games. It contains information on how to install the game and run it.
- An official website is a website created for the promotion and usually the sale of a video game. The information found on a website is similar to that of a manual.
- Dialogue for dubbing is the translated dialogue that is prepared for a voice actor to read out.
- Dialogue for subtitling is the translated dialogue that is applied to pre-rendered or pre-recorded video. Most subtitles are hard-coded in to ensure that the video and subtitles are in-sync.
- A user interface (UI) is what the player of a video game interacts with. It can contain a variety of different assets that need to be translated. Producers need to ensure that the interface's assets are big enough to contain readable text when translating, as well as confirming that graphics without text convey a clear message in the target market. Additionally, games must be able to support various special characters if the user is able to input text.

== Controversy ==
During the 2010s there was significant debate surrounding the localisation of Japanese games, particularly for Nintendo platforms. Some fans consider resulting changes to plot and characterization as marring the original artistic vision, and some object to sexual content being removed or bowdlerized. Localization of Nintendo games is commonly handled by a Nintendo division called the Treehouse. In the face of Nintendo's unwillingness to communicate about localization, speculation and conspiracy theories circulated among enthusiasts, and several employees of the Treehouse were alleged to be responsible for unpopular changes.

Allison Rapp, a Treehouse employee not directly involved in localization, garnered controversy due to her comments on Twitter. Attention on Rapp was heightened as part of the Gamergate controversy by the circulation of an undergraduate essay by Rapp which favored cultural relativism regarding sexualization of minors in Japanese media. The essay argued against the sort of censorship that the Treehouse's critics decried. Some however interpreted the essay as defending the exploitation of children, and readers of the alt-right, neo-Nazi publication The Daily Stormer organized a letter-writing campaign to have her fired. That initiative was controversial within the Gamergate movement, with some supporters considering it justifiable treatment of an ideological opponent, while others considered the campaign against Rapp to be unethical or not aligned with the movement's goals. Rapp was subsequently fired, though Nintendo issued a statement that the reason was that Rapp had held a second job against company policy. She maintains that her controversial online presence was the true cause.

== See also ==
- Fan translation of video games
- Undubbing
- Accessibility
- Localization of Square Enix video games

== Bibliography ==
- Bernal-Merino, M. 2006. "On the Translation of Video Games". The Journal of Specialised Translation, Issue 6: 22–36
- Bernal-Merino, M. 2007. "Training translators for the video game industry", in J. Diaz-Cintas (ed.), The Didactics of Audiovisual Translation. Amsterdam / Philadelphia: John Benjamins.
- Bernal-Merino, M. 2007. "Localization and the Cultural Concept of Play". Game Career Guide
- Bernal-Merino, M. 2007. "Challenges in the Translation of Video Games". Tradumática, No. 5.
- Bernal-Merino, Miguel. (2008). "Inside the Game Localisation Round Table". Develop. Retrieved December 2, 2014.
- Chandler, H. 2005. The Game Localization Handbook. Massachusetts: Charles River Media
- Chandler, Heather M and Stephanie O'Malley Deming. (2012). The Game Localization Handbook (2nd ed.). Sudbury, MA; Ontario and London: Jones & Bartlett Learning.
- "Clan DLAN: Traducción de videojuegos, traducción y creación de mods, modding, revisiones, guías, rol y más. Todo en español". (2014). Retrieved December 2, 2014
- Corliss, Jon. (2007). "All Your Base are Belong to Us! Videogame Localization and Thing Theory". Accessed July 15, 2012. Retrieved December 2nd, 2014
- Dietz, F. 2006. Issues in localizing computer games. Perspectives on Localization edited by Keiran J. Dunne. Amsterdam and Philadelphia: John Benjamins, 121–134.
- Dietz, Frank. (2007). "How Difficult Can That Be? The Work of Computer and Video Game Localization". Revista Tradumatica 5: "La localitzacio de videojocs". Accessed July 12, 2011.
- Diaz Montón, Diana. (2007). "It's a Funny Game". The Linguist 46 (3). Accessed July 12, 2011. Retrieved December 2, 2014
- Edwards, Kate. GDC 2006 presentation "Fun Vs. Offensive"
- Esselink, B. 2000. A Practical Guide to Localization. Amsterdam and Philadelphia: John Benjamins.
- Fahey, Mike. (2009). "Star Wars: The Old Republic Script More Than 40 Novels Long". Kotaku. Retrieved December 2, 2014
- Good, Owen. (2009). "Swastika Gets Wolfenstein Pulled from German Shelves" Kotaku. Retrieved December 2nd, 2014
- Heimburg, E, 2006. Localizing MMORPGs. Perspectives on Localization edited by Keiran J. Dunne. Amsterdam and Philadelphia: John Benjamins,135–154.
- Kohler, Chris. (2005). Power-up: How Japanese Video Games Gave the World an Extra Life. Indianapolis: Brady Games.
- Mangiron, C. & O'Hagan, M. 2006. "Game localization: unleashing imagination with 'restricted' translation". The Journal of Specialised Translation 6: 10–21
- O'Hagan, Minako and Mangiron, Carme. (2013). Game Localization: translating for the global digital entertainment industry. Amsterdam/Philadelphia: John Benjamins Publishing Company.
- Sutton-Smith, B. 1997. The Ambiguity of Play. Cambridge/London: Harvard University Press.
- "The Mother 3 Fan Translation". Retrieved December 2, 2014
- Zhang, Xiaochun. (2012). "Censorship and Digital Games Localisation in China". Meta: journal des traducteurs, 57(2), 338–350. Retrieved December 2, 2014
