= Traveling carnival =

Moveable amusement park

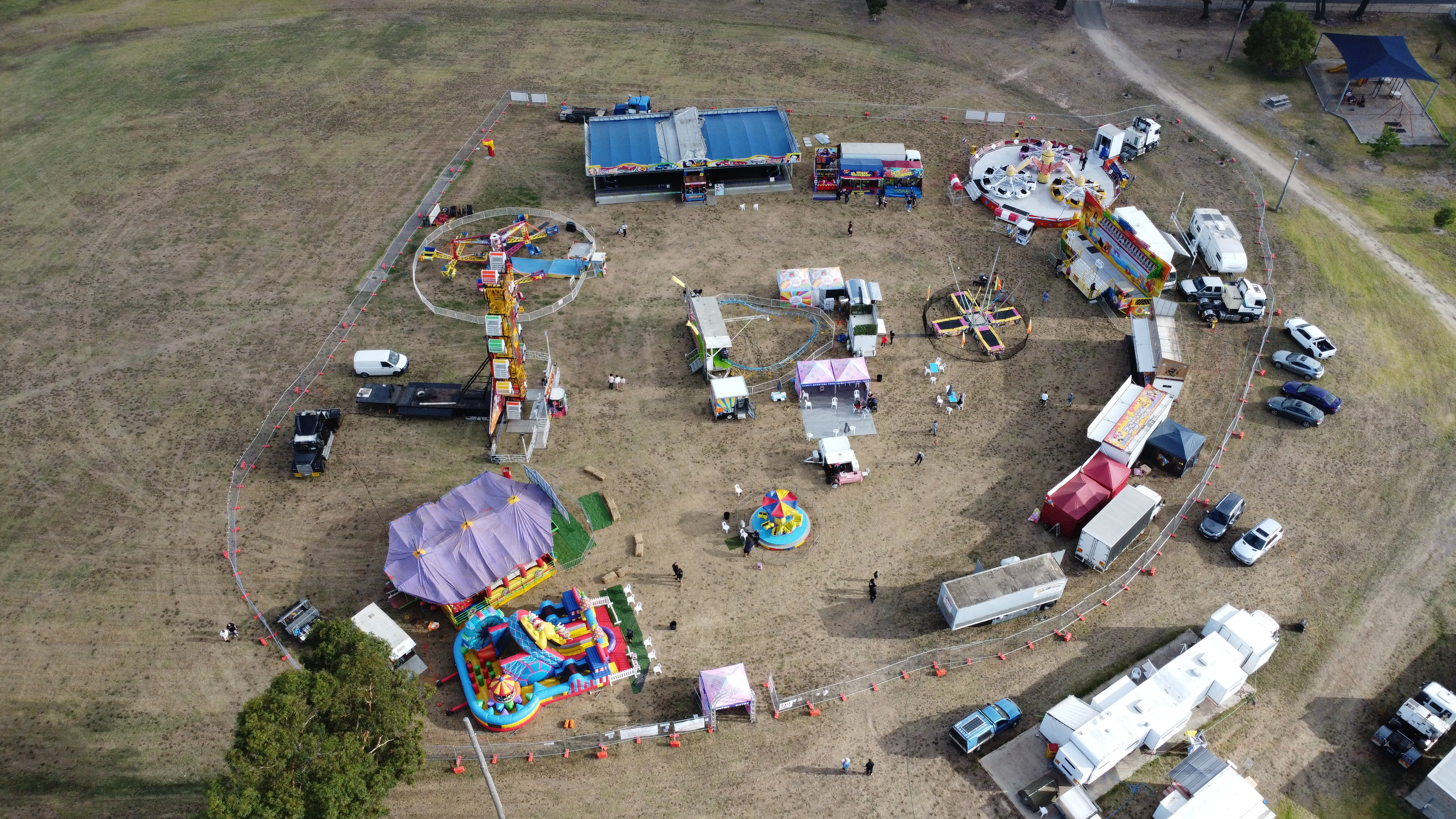
Traveling carnival

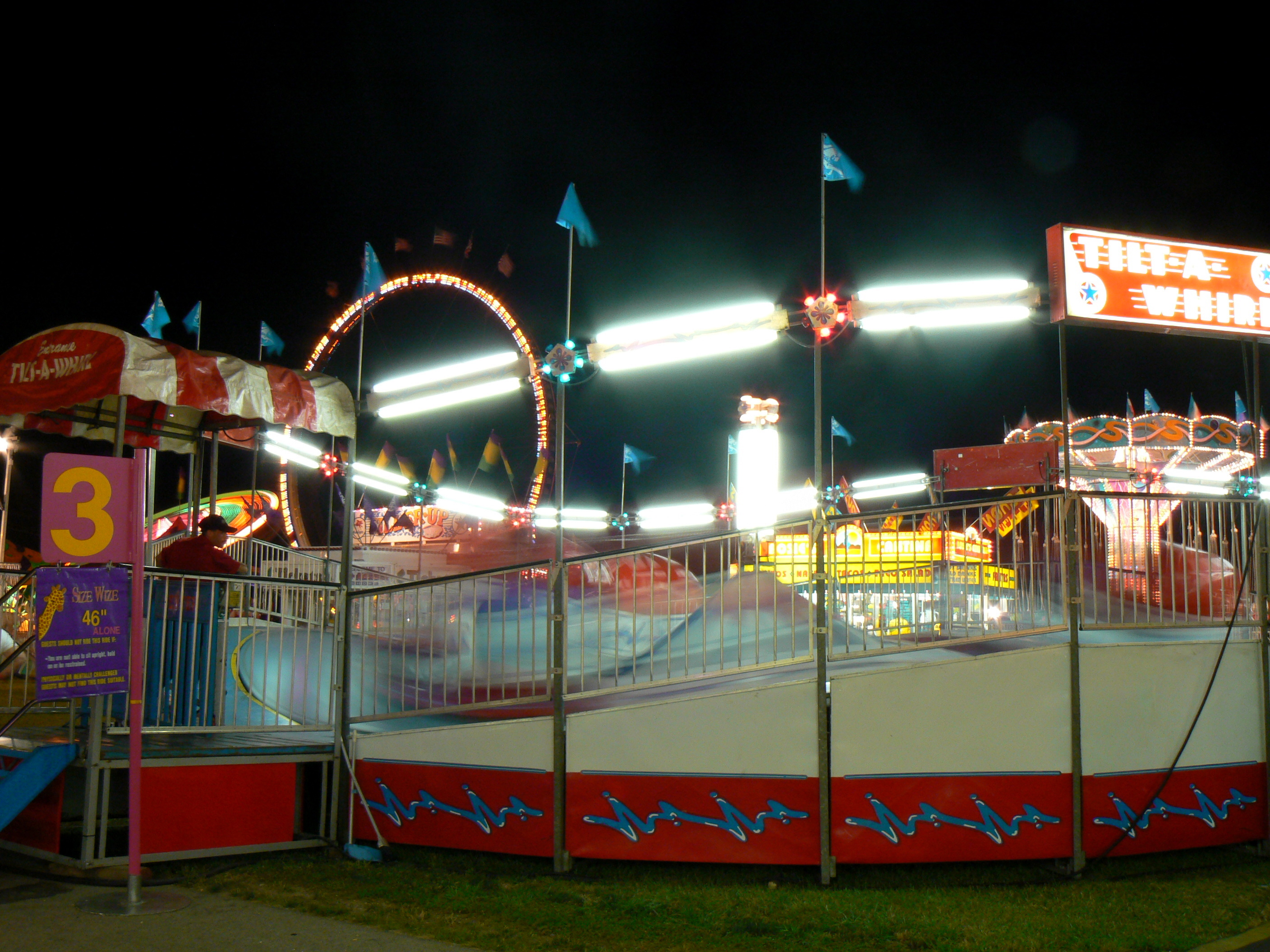
A Tilt-A-Whirl

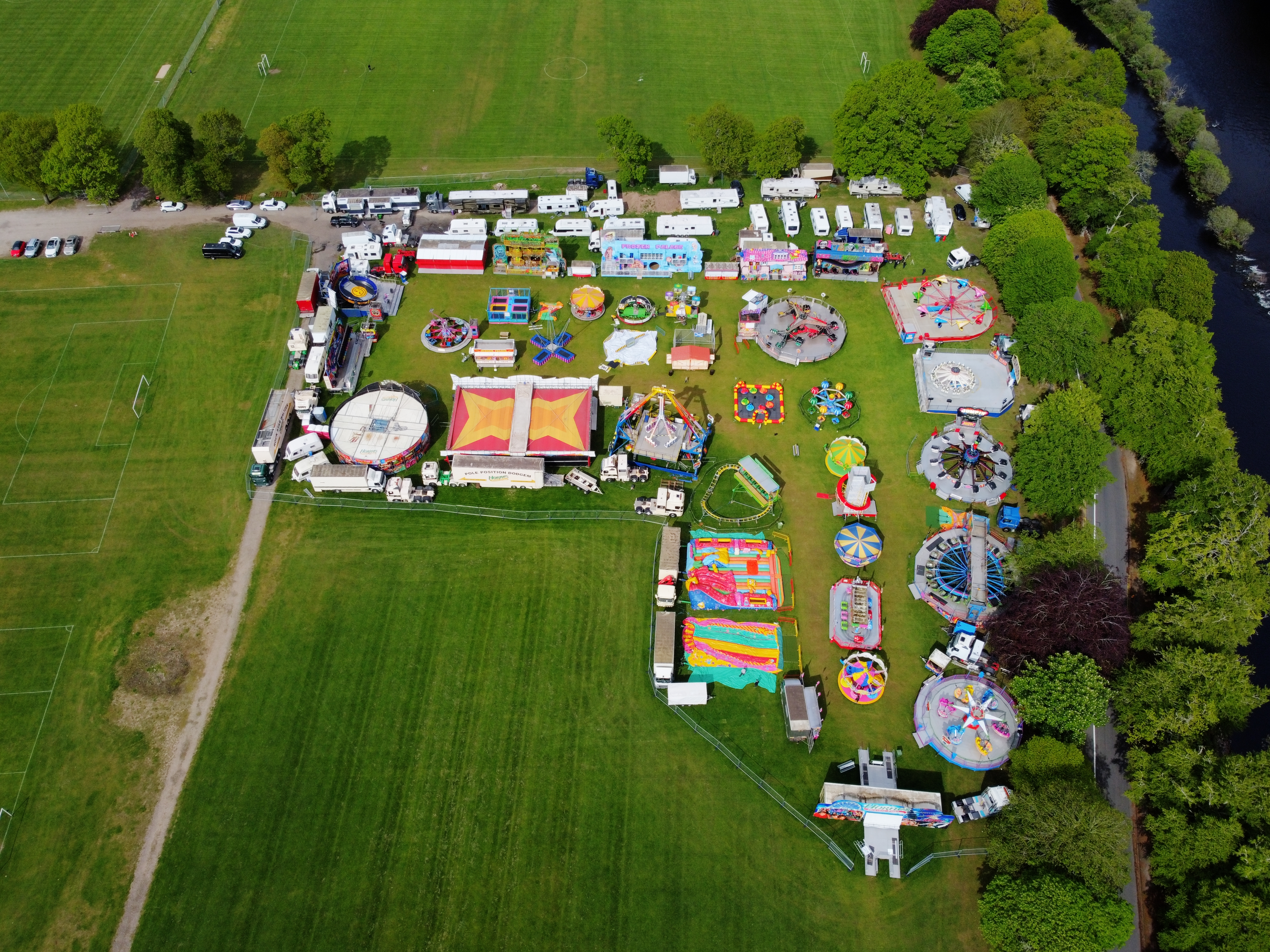
Travelling funfair in Inverness, Scotland

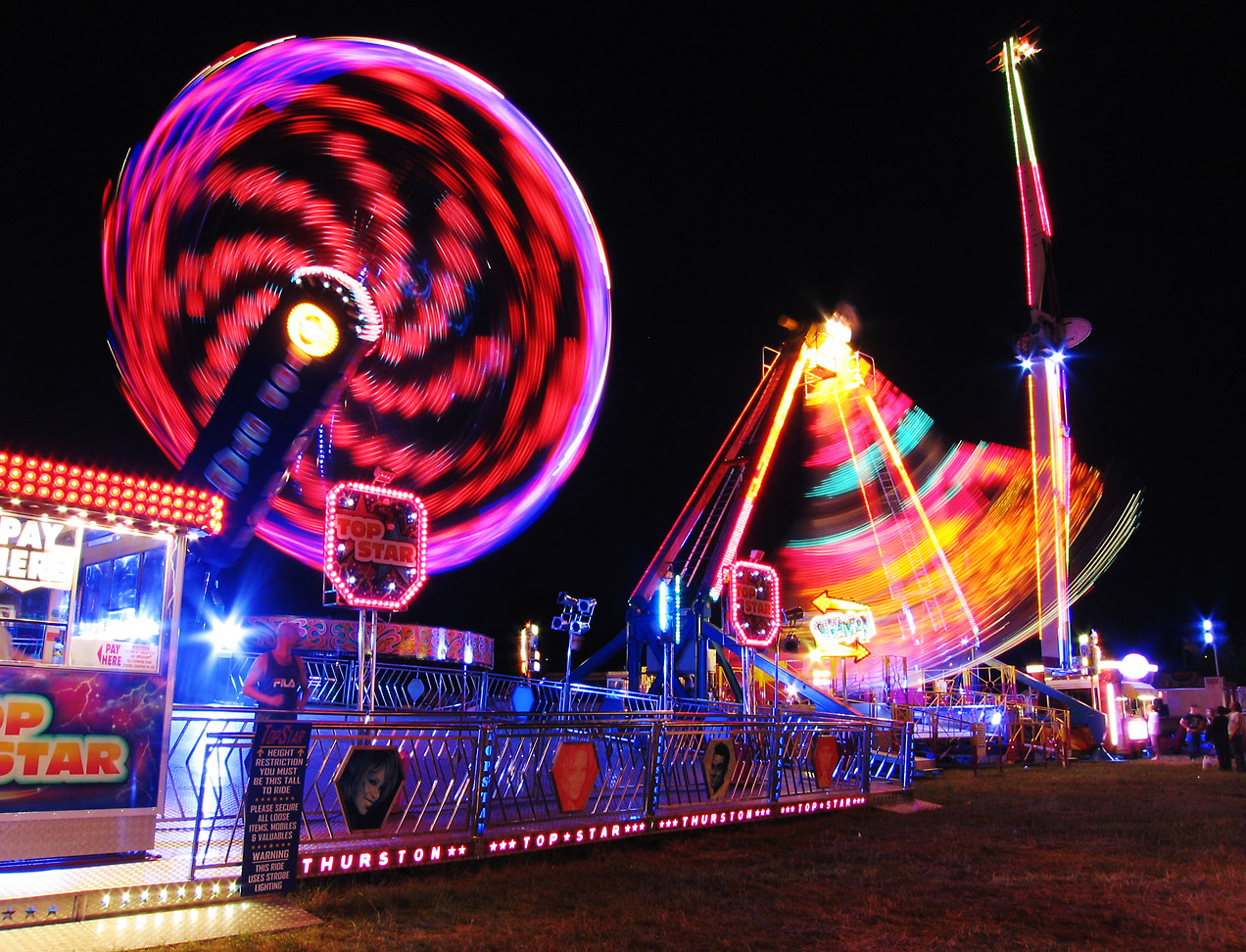
A travelling funfair has many attractions, including adult or thrill rides, children's rides, and sideshows consisting of games of skill, strength, or luck.

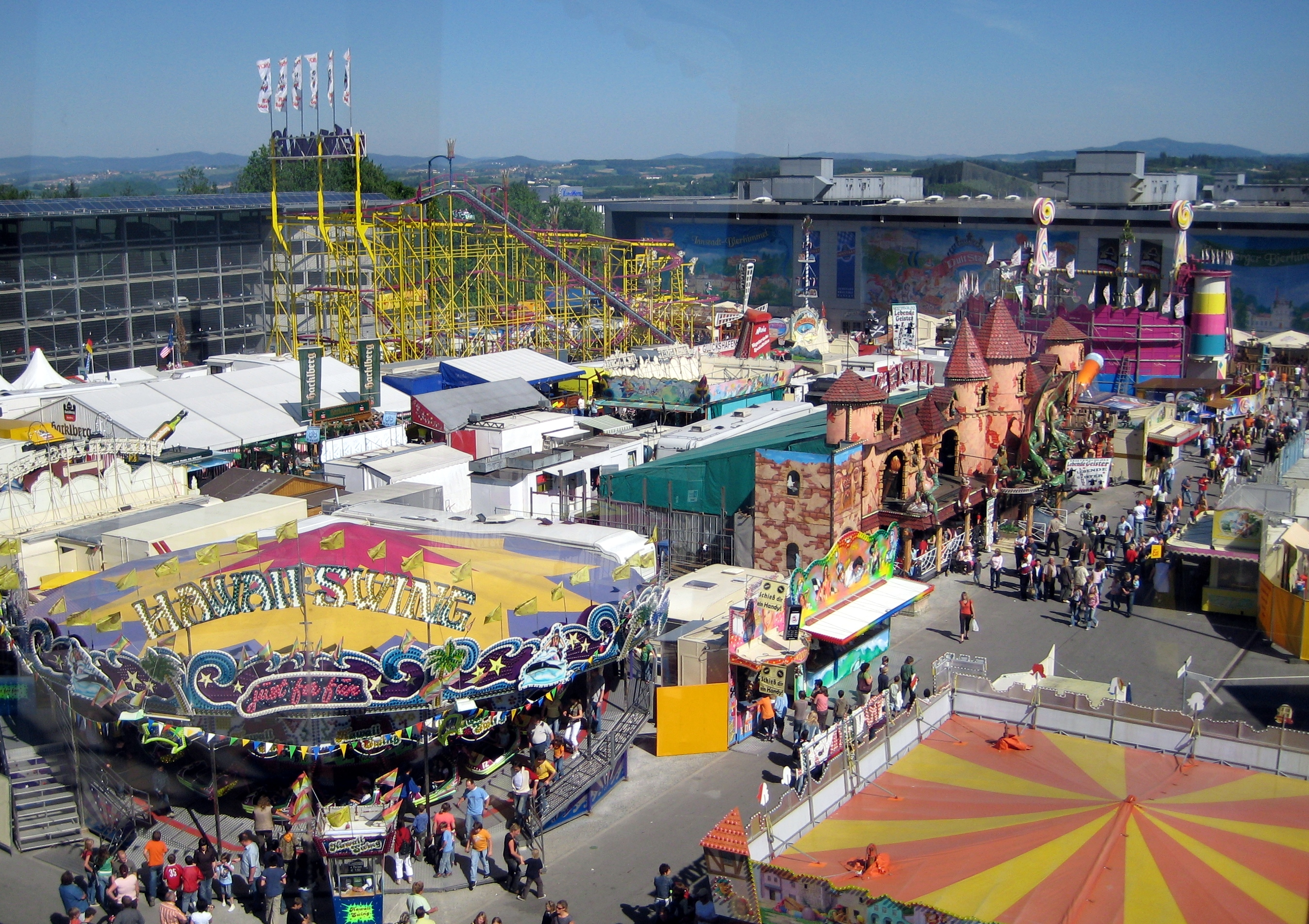
A funfair in Passau, Germany

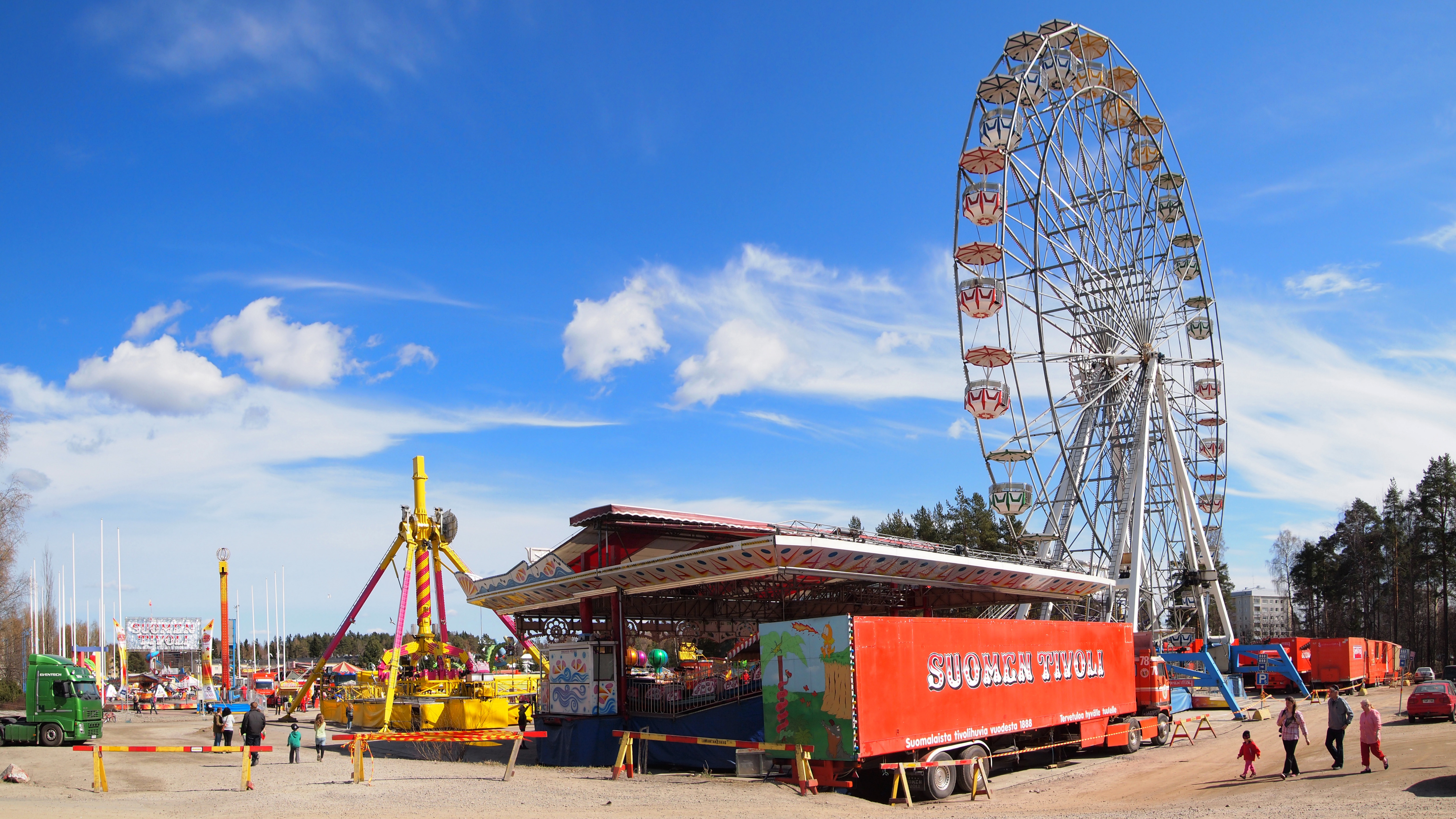
A Finnish funfair Suomen Tivoli in Jyväskylä, Finland

A traveling carnival (American English), usually simply called a carnival, travelling funfair or travelling show (British English), is an amusement show that may be made up of amusement rides, food vendors, merchandise vendors, games of chance and skill, thrill acts, and animal acts. A traveling carnival is not set up at a permanent location, like an amusement park, but is moved from place to place. Its roots are similar to the 19th century circus with both being fitted-up in open fields near or in town and moving to a new location after a period of time. In fact, many carnivals have circuses while others have a clown aesthetic in their decor. Unlike traditional Carnival celebrations, the North American traveling carnival is not tied to a religious observance.

== History ==
In 1893, the Chicago's World's Columbian Exposition (also called the Chicago World's Fair) was the catalyst for the development of the modern traveling carnival. The Chicago World's Fair had an area that included rides, games of chance, freak shows, and burlesque. After the Chicago World's Fair, traveling carnival companies began touring the United States. Due to the type of acts featured along with sometimes using dishonest business practices, the traveling carnivals were often looked down upon.

Modern traveling carnivals usually make contracts with local governments in order to play both state and county fairs, as well as smaller venues (such as store parking lots, church bazaars, volunteer fire department fund raisers, and civic celebrations).

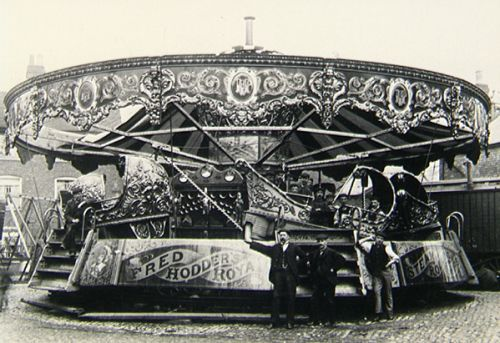
Savage's amusement ride, Sea-On-Land, where the riders would pitch up and down as if they were on the sea. His "galloping horse" innovation is seen on carousels today.

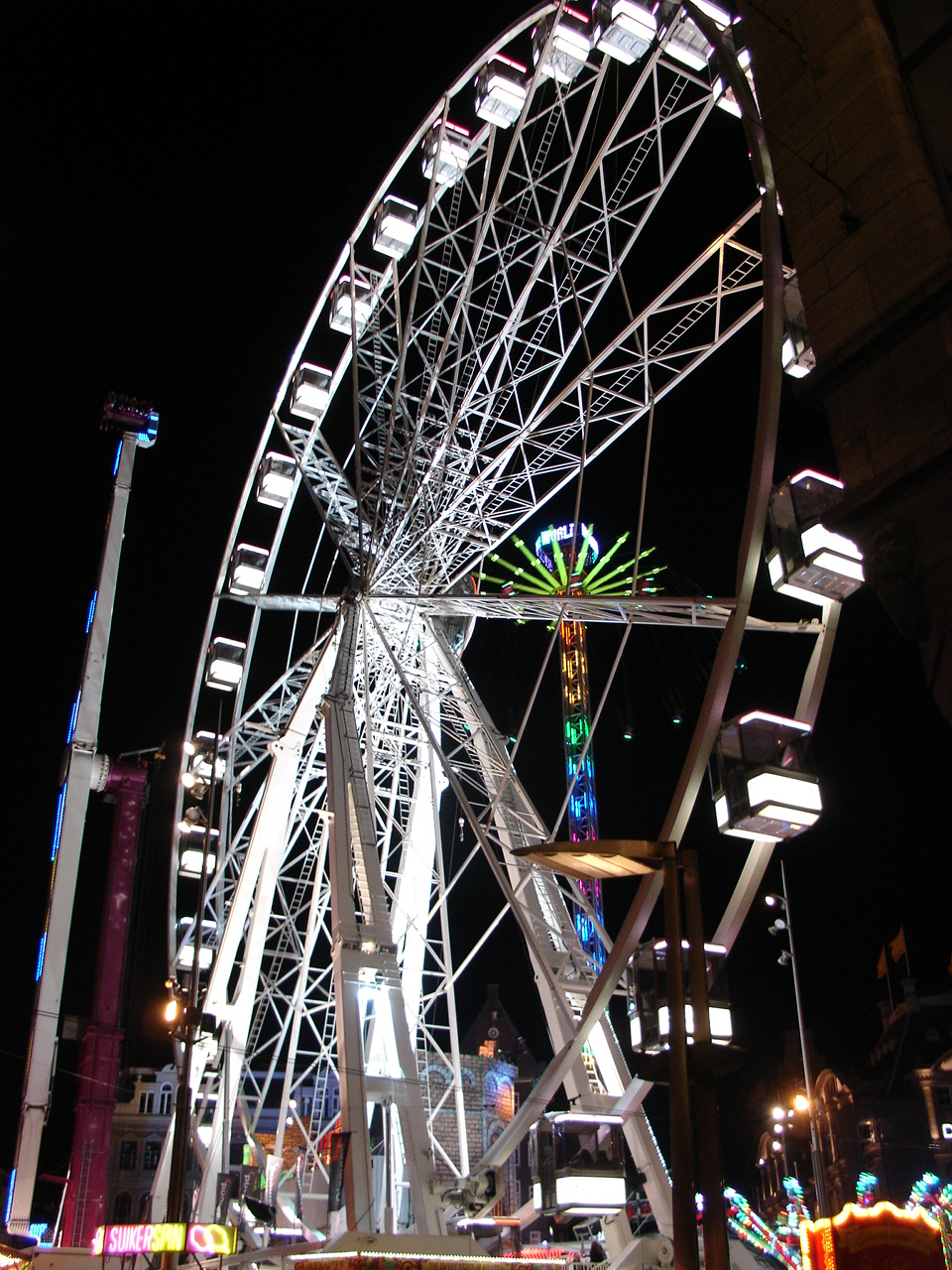
A ferris wheel in Amsterdam, Netherlands

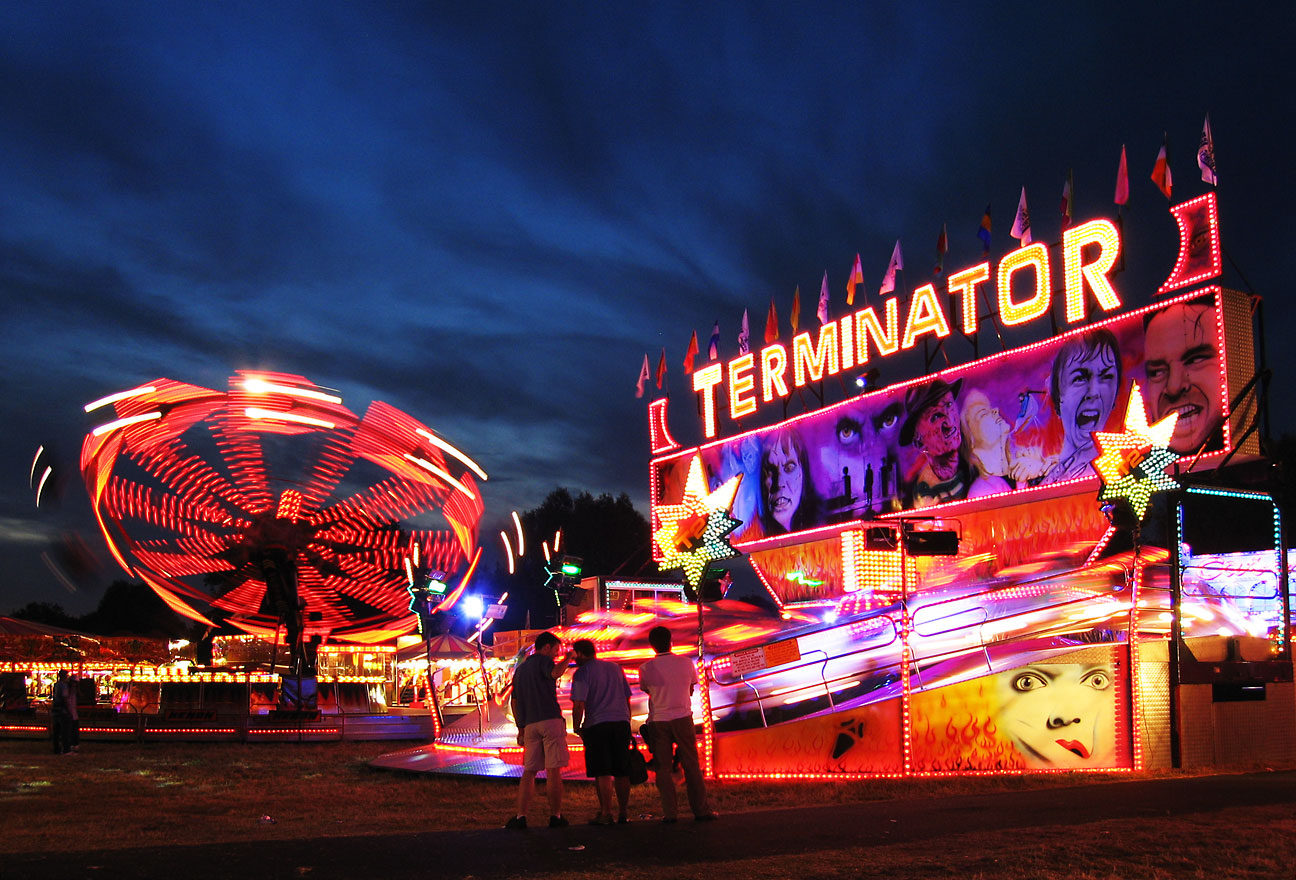
Many thrill rides, such as the paratrooper and the Matterhorn, include spinning people at high speed coupled with other accelerations.

Originally, a fair would also have had a significant number of market stalls; today this is rare and most sidestalls only offer food or games. The first fairground rides began to appear in the 18th century. These were small, made of wood and propelled by gangs of boys. In the 19th century, before the development of mechanical attractions, sideshows were the mainstay of most funfairs. Typical shows included menageries of wild animals, freak shows, wax works, boxing/wrestling challenges, and theatrical shows. In 1868, Frederick Savage, an agricultural engineer from King's Lynn, devised a method of driving rides by steam. His invention, a steam engine mounted in the center of the ride, transformed the fairground industry in England and around the world. The preeminent carousel maker in the 19th century, his fairground machinery was exported globally.

=== United States ===
Through most of the 19th century, rural North America enjoyed the entertainment of traveling shows. These shows could include a circus, vaudeville show, burlesque show, or a magic lantern show. It is believed that the 1893 Chicago World's Fair was the catalyst that brought about the modern traveling carnival. At the Chicago World's Fair was an avenue at the edge of the grounds called the Midway Plaisance. This avenue of the fair had games of chance, freak shows, wild west shows (including Buffalo Bill whose show was set up near the fairground) and burlesque shows. It also featured the original Ferris Wheel, constructed by George Washington Gale Ferris Jr. Following the Chicago World's Fair, the term "midway" was adopted from the Midway Plaisance to denote the area at county and state fairs where sideshow entertainment was located.

Otto Schmitt, a showman at the world's fair, formed Chicago Midway Plaisance Amusement Company. The company featured thirteen acts, including some from the World's Fair, and began a tour of the northeast US. His company closed due to poor business practices before completing its first tour. Some members of his company formed successful traveling carnivals after Otto Schmitt's company closed. The appeal of this new type of entertainment was embraced. In 1902, there were seventeen traveling carnivals in the US. The number grew to 46 in 1905; by 1937 there was an estimated 300 carnivals touring the country.

== Operations ==
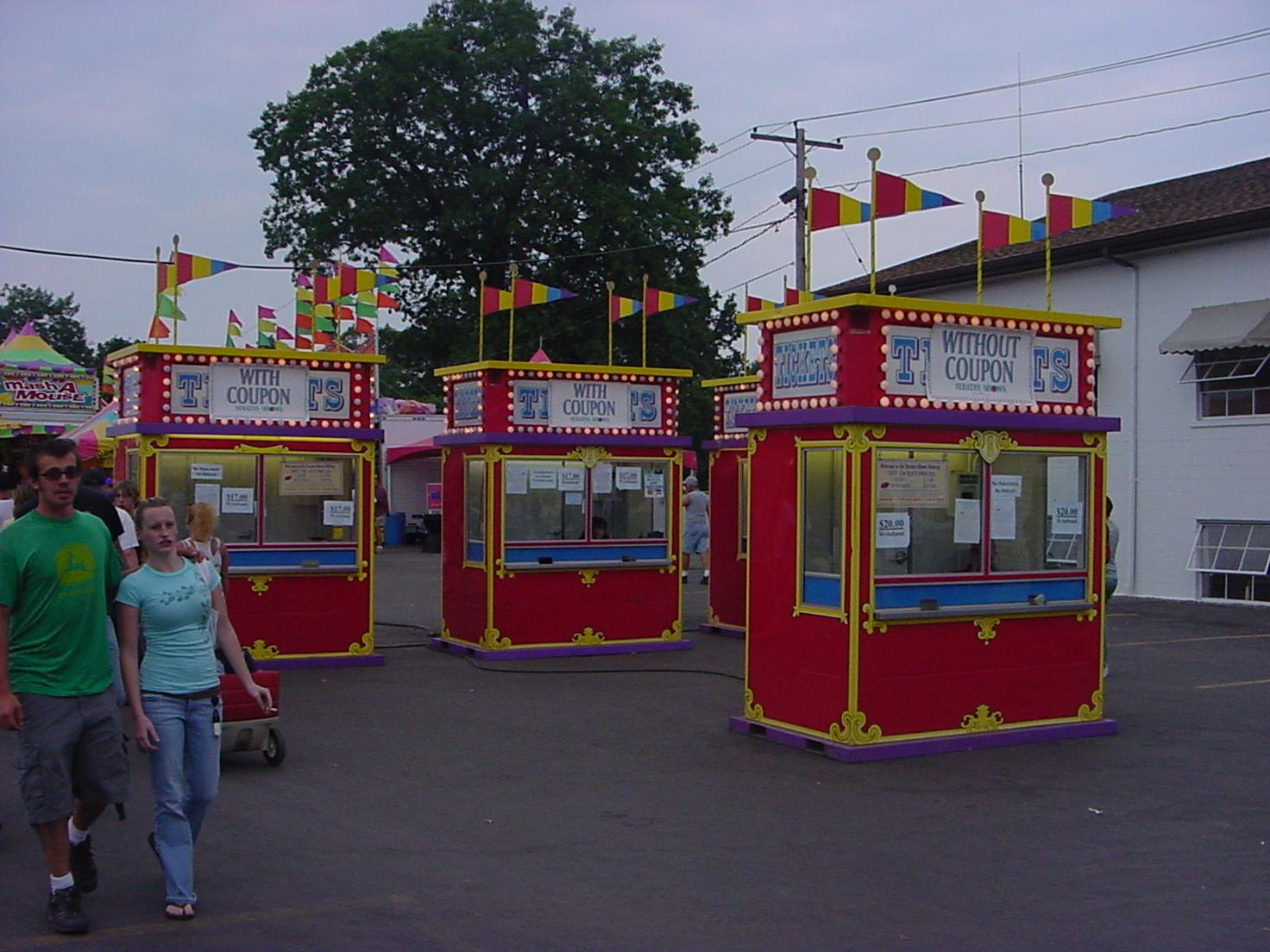
Ticket booths

Worldwide there are many different traveling carnival companies. Most carnivals are not made up of just one operator of rides, food or games. Many of these venues are operated by independent owners who contract (or "book") with the carnival. These independent owners are contracted to pay the carnival operator a percentage of what their ride or stand grosses in sales. It is common for the independent owners within a traveling carnival to be related, or have intertwined family histories.

Many carnival operators are so big that they have carnival "units" or divisions. Each of these units may consist of six or more major rides. By having these units, a carnival operator can have a carnival operating in many different areas during the same week.

Rides and stands are generally transported by truck. The rides generally have wheels mounted on the base and the rest of the ride is then dismantled and folded up to allow for over-the-road transport. Food stands are usually tow-behind trailers, although there are still some booths that require complete take down and packing. Some large carnival operators transport their equipment from one location to another by rail.

A traveling carnival operator may schedule their carnival for certain seasons. They will have their carnivals in warm climate southern areas and then move into northern regions during the warmer months.

Admission is often charged for county or state fairs, but is usually free at most carnivals. Tickets or all-day passes are usually sold for rides. When a carnival is "playing" a fair, exhibits or displays may charge their own entry fee, as well as some entertainment acts (such as a music concert, tractor pulling, or a demolition derby).

== Food ==
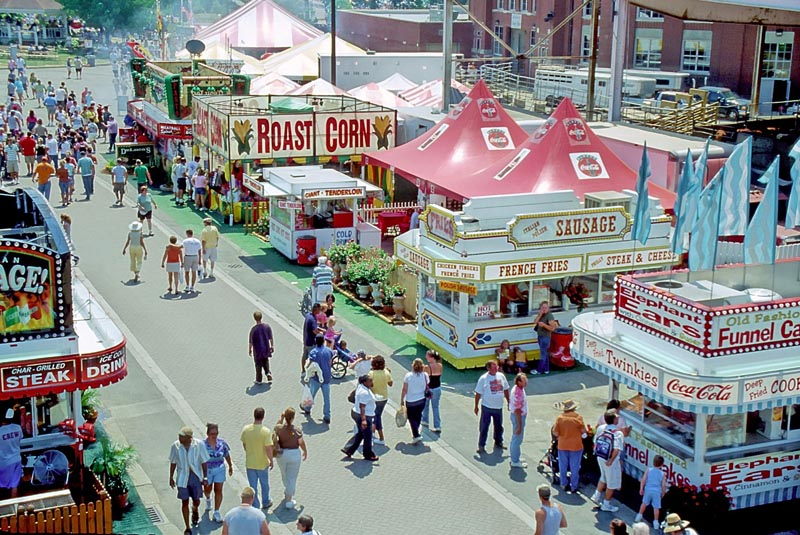
Ohio State Fair food stands

There are food stands at carnivals which serve a variety of food and beverages. They offer snack items like cotton candy, popcorn, ice cream, fried dough, funnel cake, candy, or caramel apples and french fries. Meal items may include pizza, hamburgers, hot dogs, and chicken. Beverages may include soda, coffee, tea, and lemonade. Local and regional specialties, along with ethnic foods such as empanadas and tacos, are often available. At autumn and winter carnivals, drinks like hot cider and hot chocolate may be available.

Junk food items like deep fried candy bars, the deep-fried Twinkie, chocolate hot dogs, Dippin' Dots ice cream, the blooming onion, and "deep-fried butter on-a-stick" are some of the delicacies that can be found at carnival food stands.

== Games ==
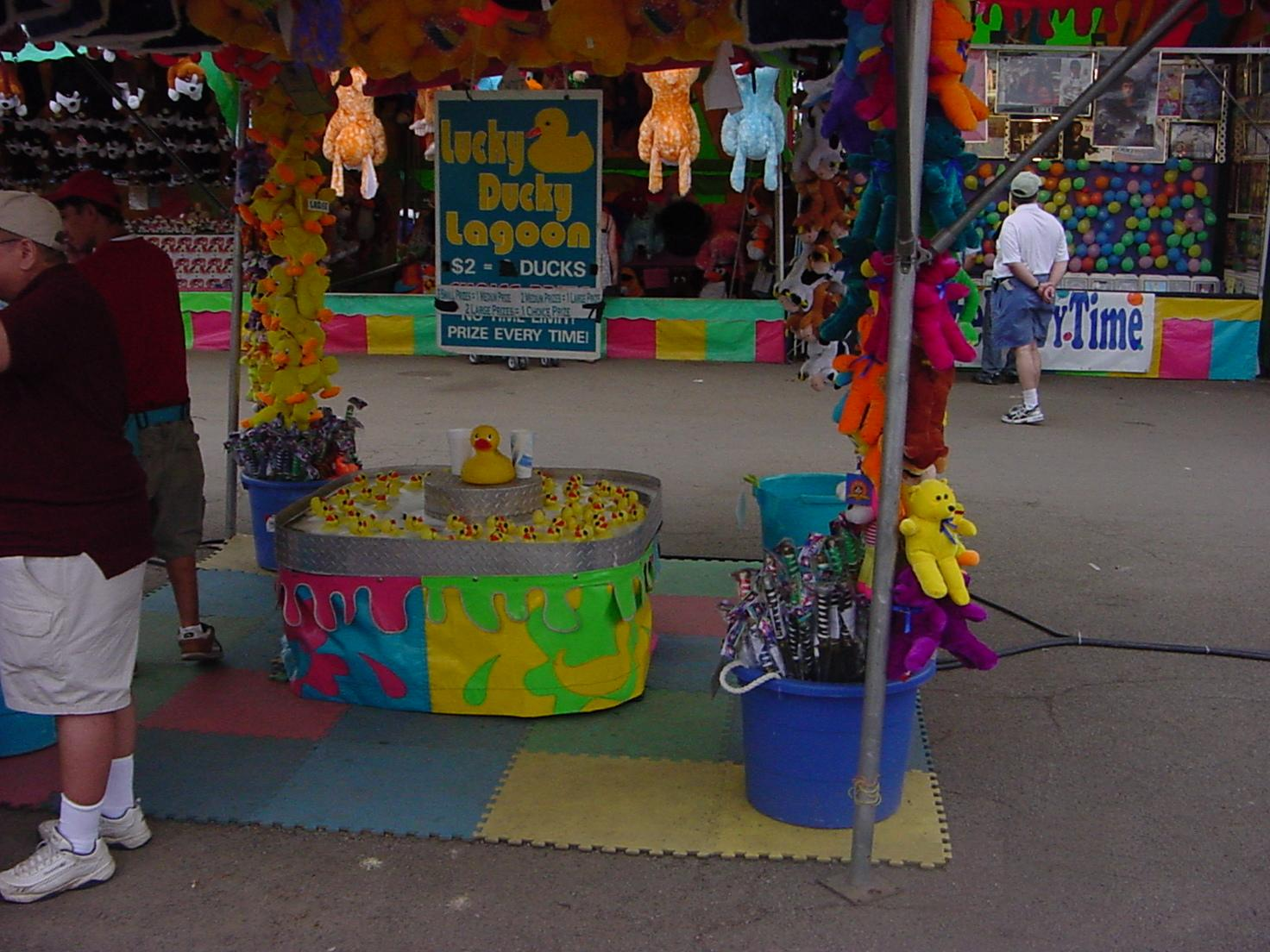
Duck Pond game

At many traveling carnivals, there are games of chance and skill. Games like the "Crossbow Shoot" game or the "Balloon and Darts" game will test an individual's target shooting ability. Other games, such as the "Water gun" game, will pit a group of individuals against each other to win the game. Chance is involved in games like the "Duck Pond" game or the "Pingpong Ball" and "Fishbowl" games. Most games offer a small prize to the winner. Prizes may be stuffed animals, toys, posters, etc. Continued play is encouraged as multiple small prizes may traded in for a larger prize. Some more difficult games, including the "Baseball and Basket" or "Stand the Bottle" game, may offer a large prize to any winner.

While the majority of game operators run honest games, some people are wary of carnival games. This may be because carnival games in the past gained a reputation for being dishonest. The term "mark" (slang term: "sucker") originated with the carnival.

When dishonest carnival game operators found someone whom they could entice to keep playing their "rigged" (slang term: "gaffed") game, they would then "mark" the player by patting their back with a hand that had chalk on it. Other game operators would then look for these chalk marks and entice the individual to also play their rigged game. This is not common practice anymore, although there still are a few confidence men in the carnival business.

Learning about how carnival games work can help an individual from being cheated.

=== Side stalls and games ===
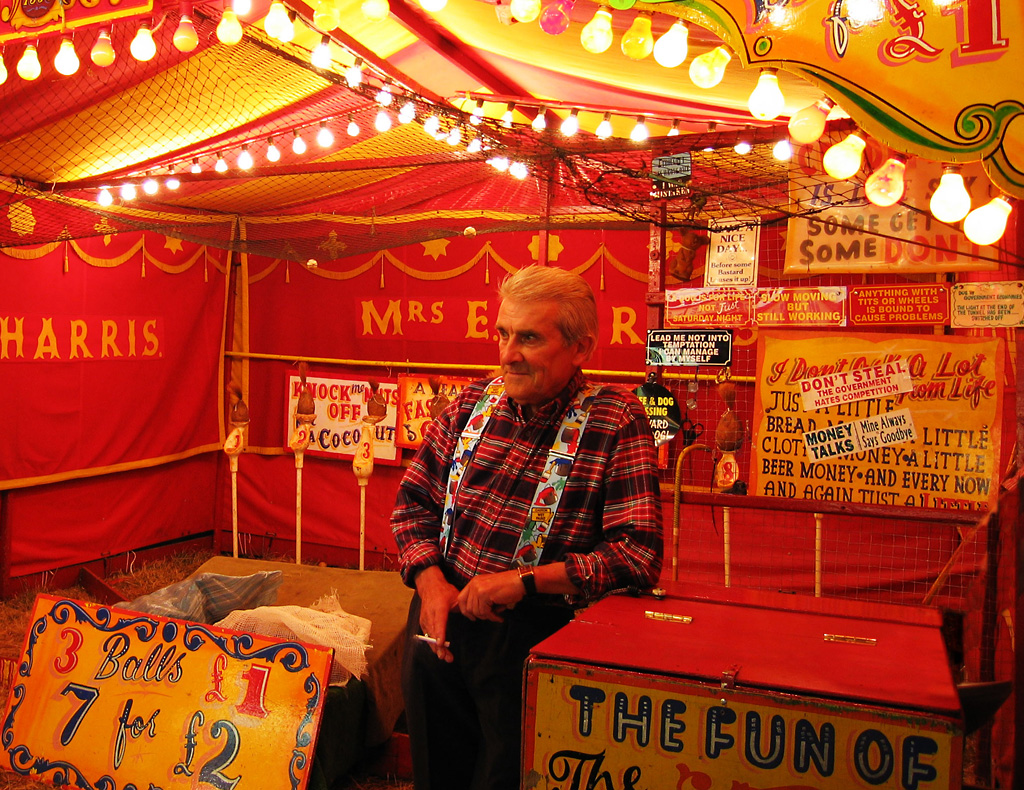
A traditional coconut shy, established in 1936 by Mrs E. Harris, is still being run by her son today.

Most stalls feature games of skill or strength. The most traditional example being the coconut shy in which players throw balls at coconuts balanced on posts, winning the coconut if they manage to dislodge it.

Other side stalls range from the trivially easy, such as hooking rubber ducks from a water trough in which nearly every player is expected to win a prize, to the deceptively challenging, which includes games which utilize optical illusions or physical relationships that are difficult to judge. Highly profitable (and therefore timeless) games include:

- ring toss, in which the customer must throw a ring around a target, often a peg or bottle. However, it is either highly difficult to throw the ring in the proper angle to get it to land around the target without bouncing out of place, or the ring is physically too small to properly fit around the target.
- ball-in-the-basket games in which the basket is presented at an angle almost certain to bounce the ball out. (The basket bottom may also be springy.)
- basketball-shooting games in which the basket is ovoid in shape and the basketball cannot fit inside the rim under any circumstances, but takes advantage of the oval shape an individual expects to see when directly confronted by a circle presented at an angle nearly parallel with the ground. (The sides of such a game are walled with netting which presumably keeps the ball in play, but the netting is typically covered with the prizes the customer hopes to win, which block the view of the basket from the side and thus exposing the hoax.) Sometimes the basketballs are also inflated to their full capacity, thus allowing the ball to bounce out of the hoop more easily.
- archery, air rifles, and paint ball guns with sometimes misaligned sights (or handled by someone who cannot shoot straight), with targets ranging from bullseyes to playing cards.
- Hit-The-Bell, high striker device to test prowess, originally fabricated from various hardware.
- milk bottle games where the customer must knock over a stack of metal milk bottles with a thrown ball. These games are often rigged by weighing down the bottles to be much more difficult to dislodge than they look, using throwing balls that are too light and soft to hit with much force, or both.
- dart games where the player must throw darts at a wall of balloons to pop them. The balloons are often not inflated fully and the darts may be blunted, making it more difficult to pop the balloons with them.
- shooting gallery games where the player must use a pellet gun to shoot out a symbol, such as a star, out of a piece of paper with a limit of time or pellets. Because the paper grows increasingly pliable as it is repeatedly punctured, the pellets will more likely bend the paper out of the way rather than penetrate it.

Much of the true "con artistry" has been driven out of funfairs in the twentieth century, and combined with an increasing emphasis on the role of families and small children in such entertainment, contemporary showmen often find greater profit in pricing their games far above the value of the prizes being offered, with complex formula for upgrading to the large prizes that advertise the game and instill desire among customers. The rises in pricing of many side stalls must often reflect the overheads of running fairground equipment – the cost of merchandise, diesel, staff, and rents.

Typical prizes change to reflect popular tastes. A traditional fairground prize used to be a goldfish in a small plastic bag, but these have fallen out of favor, partly because goldfish are no longer seen as exotic, but also because of animal welfare concerns. Many stalls offer cuddly toys as prizes.

=== Image gallery ===
Crossbow target shooting game

Weight guessing booth

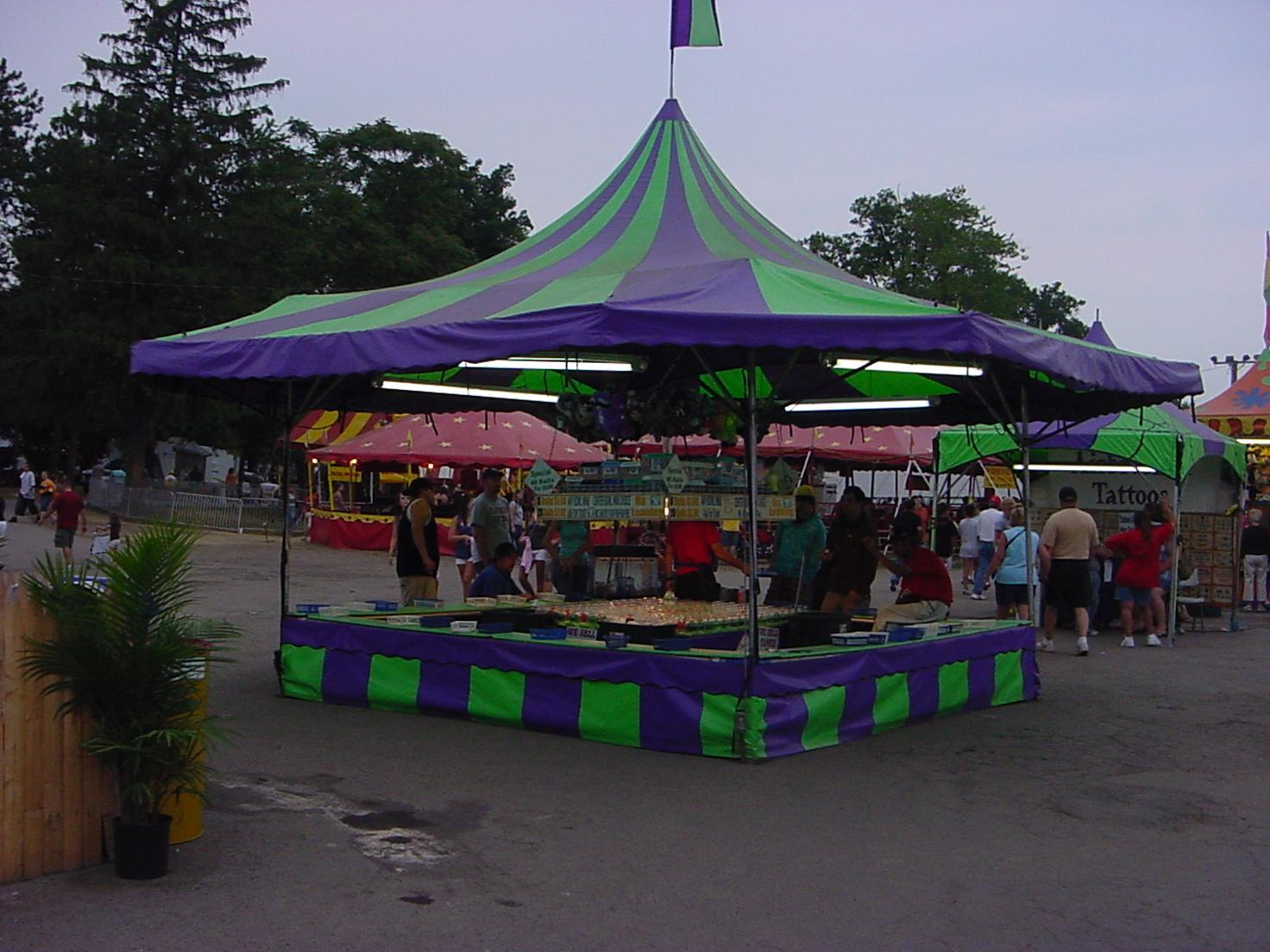
Pingpong ball and fishbowl game

Balloon and dart game

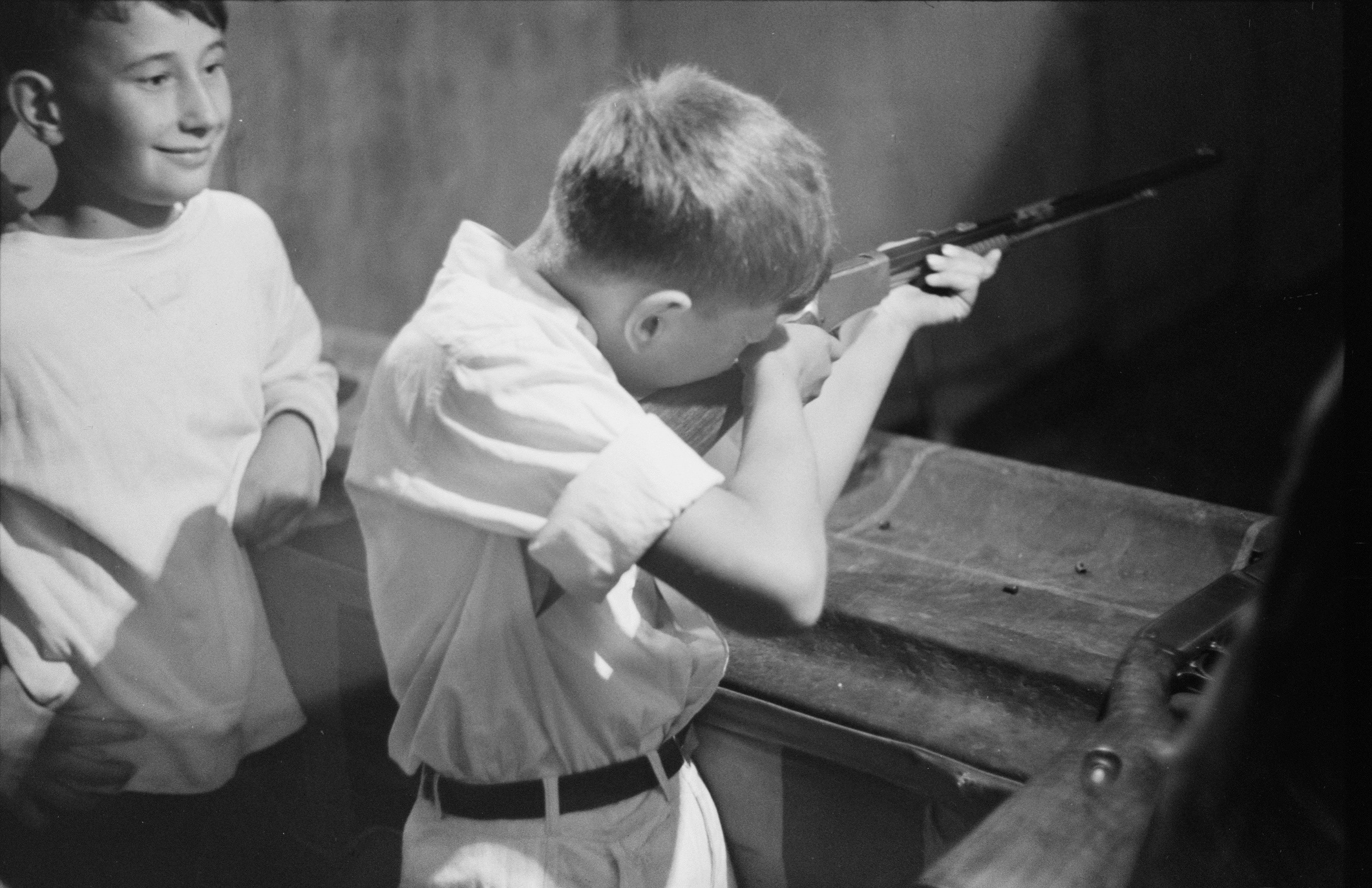
Shooting game during a firemen's convention in Sturgeon Bay Wisconsin, 1940

== Rides ==
Many traveling carnivals bring with them an assortment of rides. Some rides are for young children and may include a carousel, ridable miniature railway, miniature roller coaster, or an inflatable bounce house. For older children and adults, there can be many different types of rides. These rides are designed to use height, speed, g-force, or centrifugal force to appeal to the riders' senses. Some examples are the Chair-O-Planes, Ferris wheel, Zipper ride, and the Tilt-A-Whirl.

The rides are generally painted in bright vibrant colors such as red, yellow and orange. Multicolored lighting is also used to enhance the rides' appearance at night. Each ride also plays its own music: a carousel may have calliope music playing while the ride next to it may have rock music for its riders. The music for each ride is usually upbeat; however, a ride such as a ghost train will have more somber music.

These rides are designed to be quickly set up and taken down, thus helping the carnival operator in moving them. Some state governments have agencies that inspect carnival rides to ensure the safety of the riders. Regulation varies by jurisdiction.

=== Thrill rides ===
There is constant innovation, with new variations on ways to spin and throw passengers around, in an effort to attract customers. With the requirement that rides be packed into one or more trailers for travel, there is a limit to the size of the rides, and funfairs struggle to compete with much larger attractions, such as roller coasters, found in amusement parks. See also amusement rides.

=== Roller coasters ===
Some fairs may feature compact roller coasters to attract teenagers and preteens. Roller coasters feature steep drops, sharp curves, and sometimes loops. Roller coasters are generally the most attractive aspect of a fair, but many people come for other reasons. Fairs usually only feature one or two coasters.

=== Children's rides ===
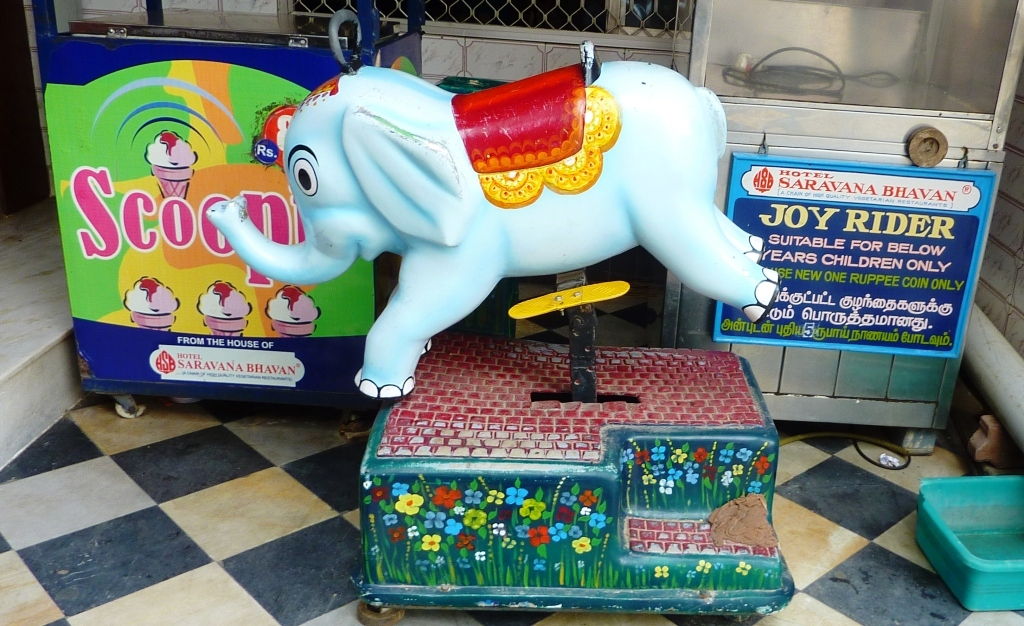
Children's ride, India

Funfairs are seen as family entertainment, and most include a significant number of children's rides. Many of these are smaller, platform based rides like, cup & saucer, toy sets, train rides, as well as smaller slower versions of the adult rides, Ferris wheels, waltzers, even children's bumper cars. Such rides are usually referred to as "juvenile rides" or just "juveniles". There are also other items for children such as slides, mirror mazes fun houses, and variations on the bouncy castle.

=== Image gallery ===
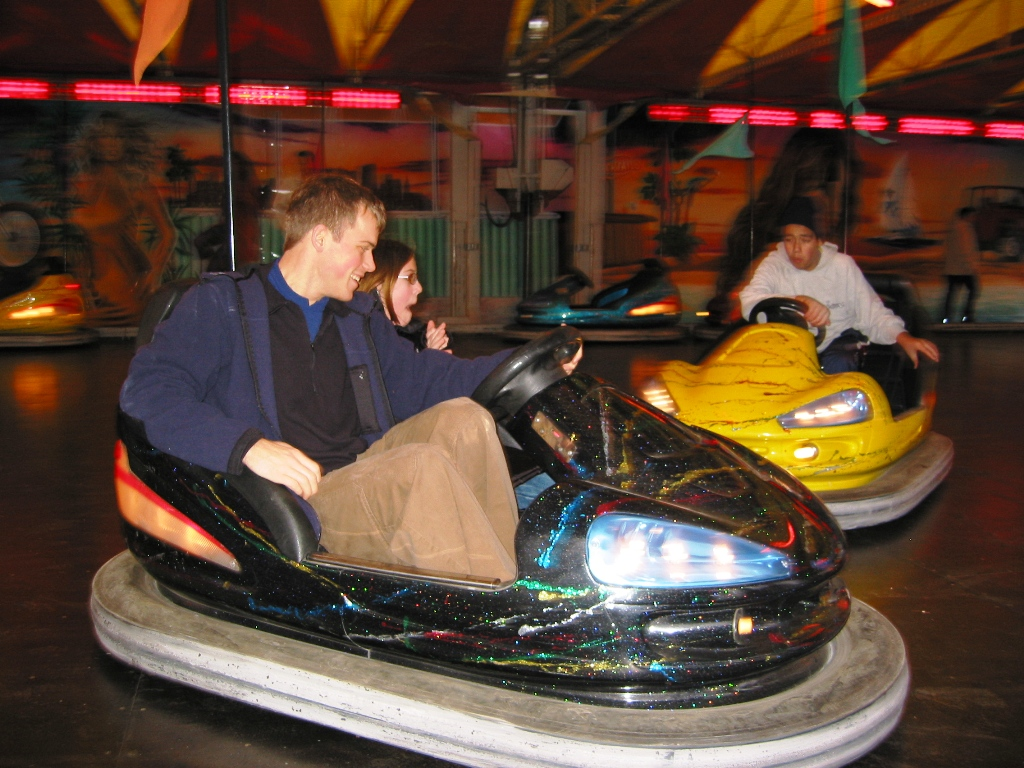
Bumper cars

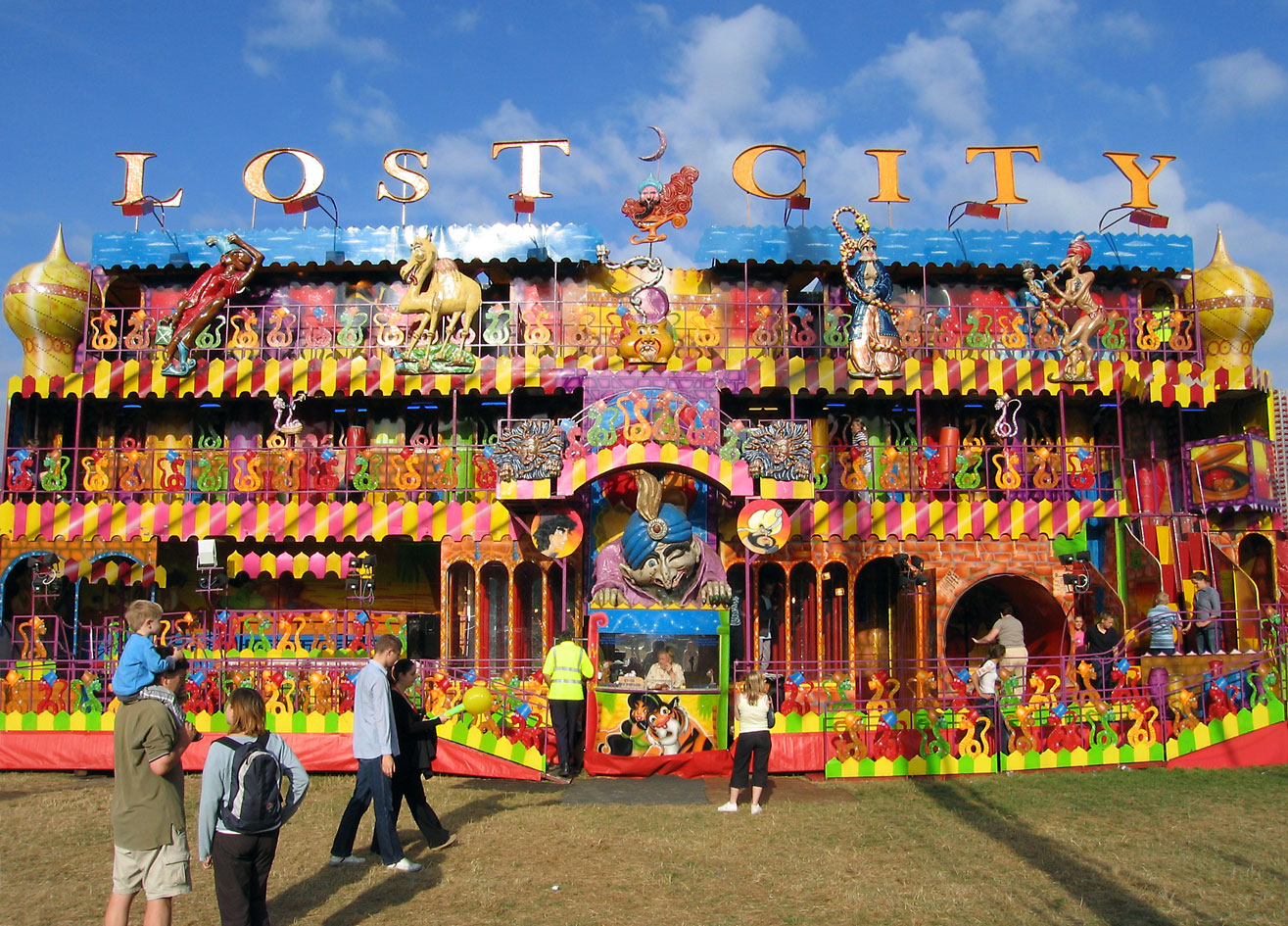
Funhouse

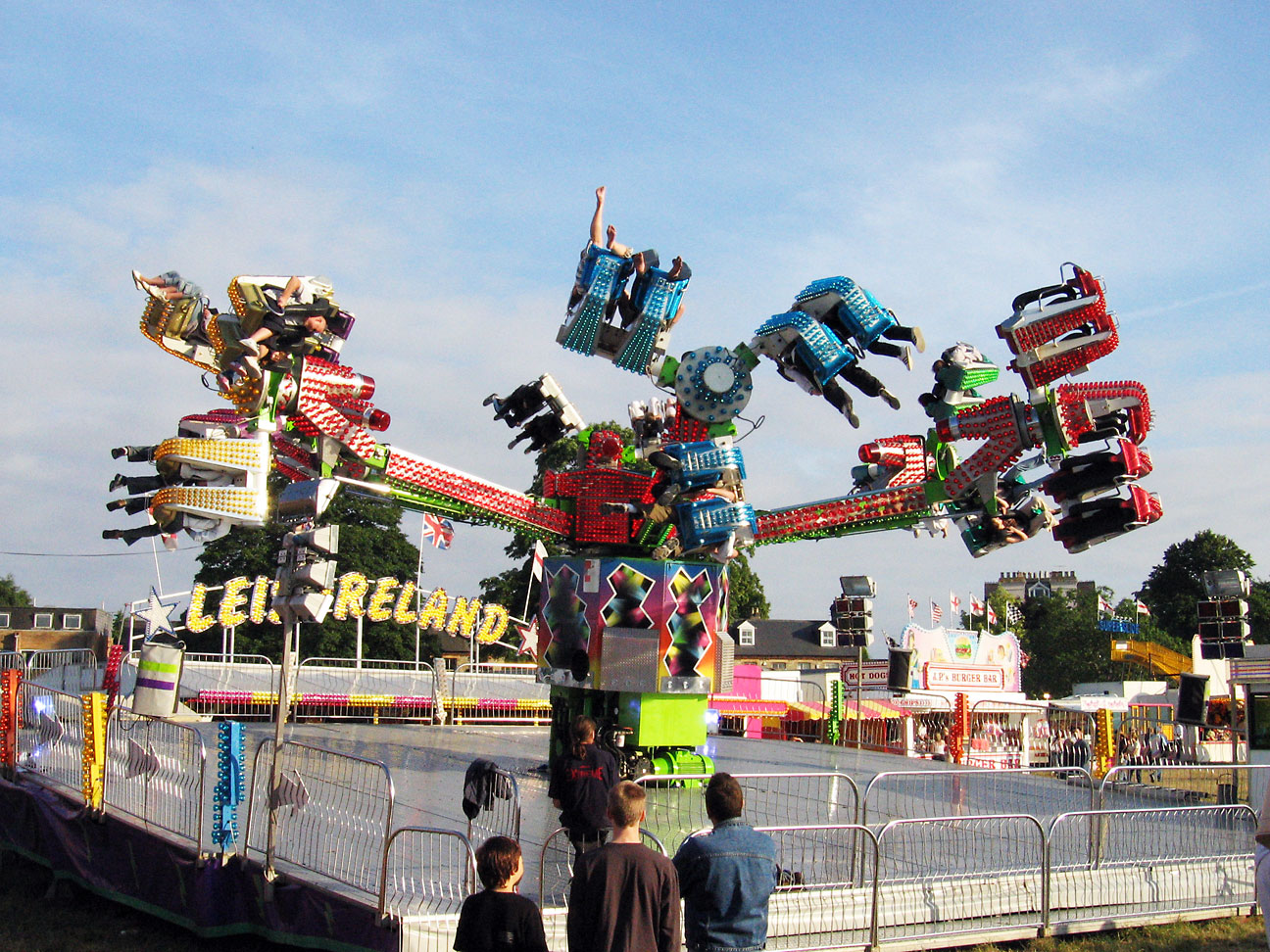
Orbiter

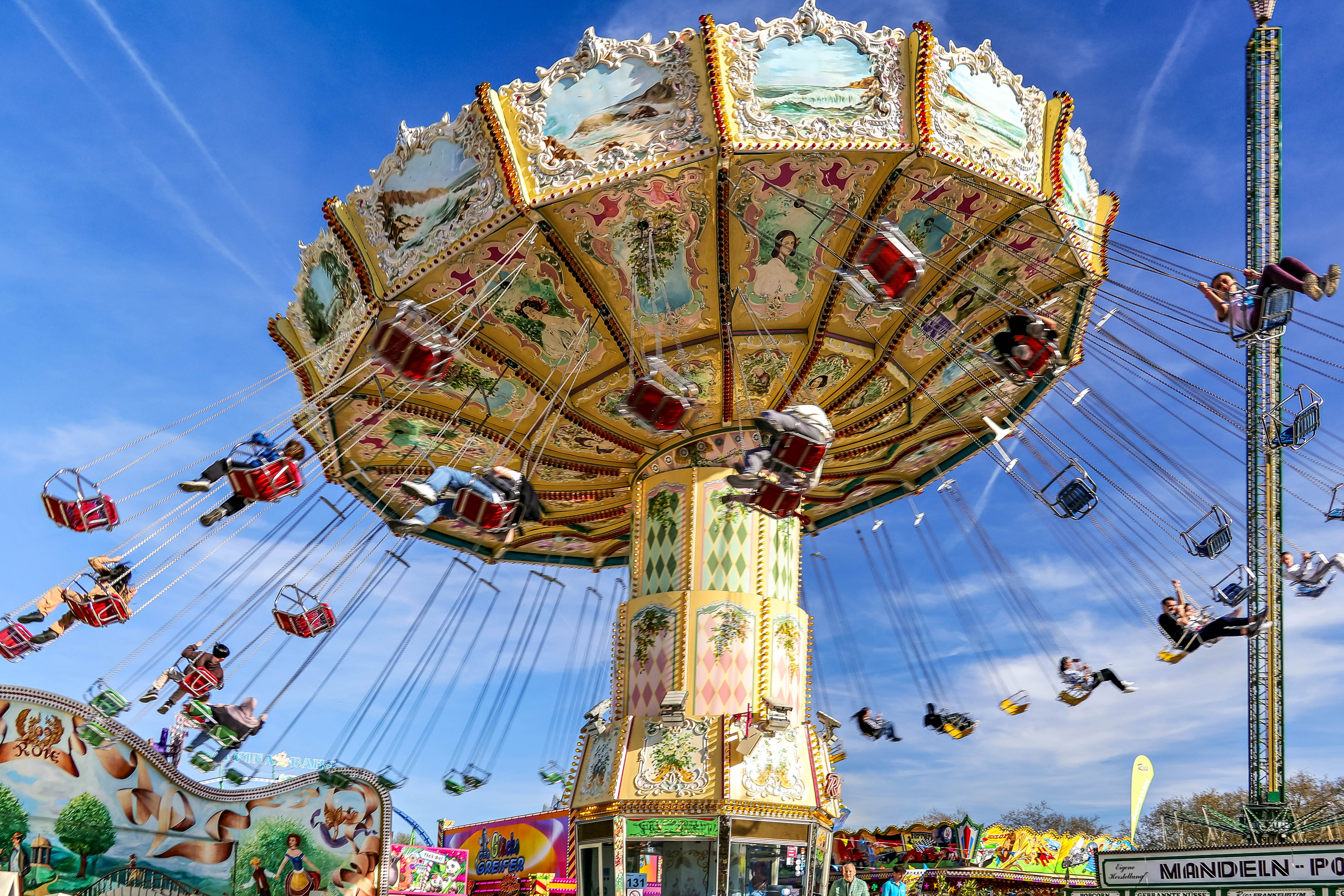
Wave Swinger

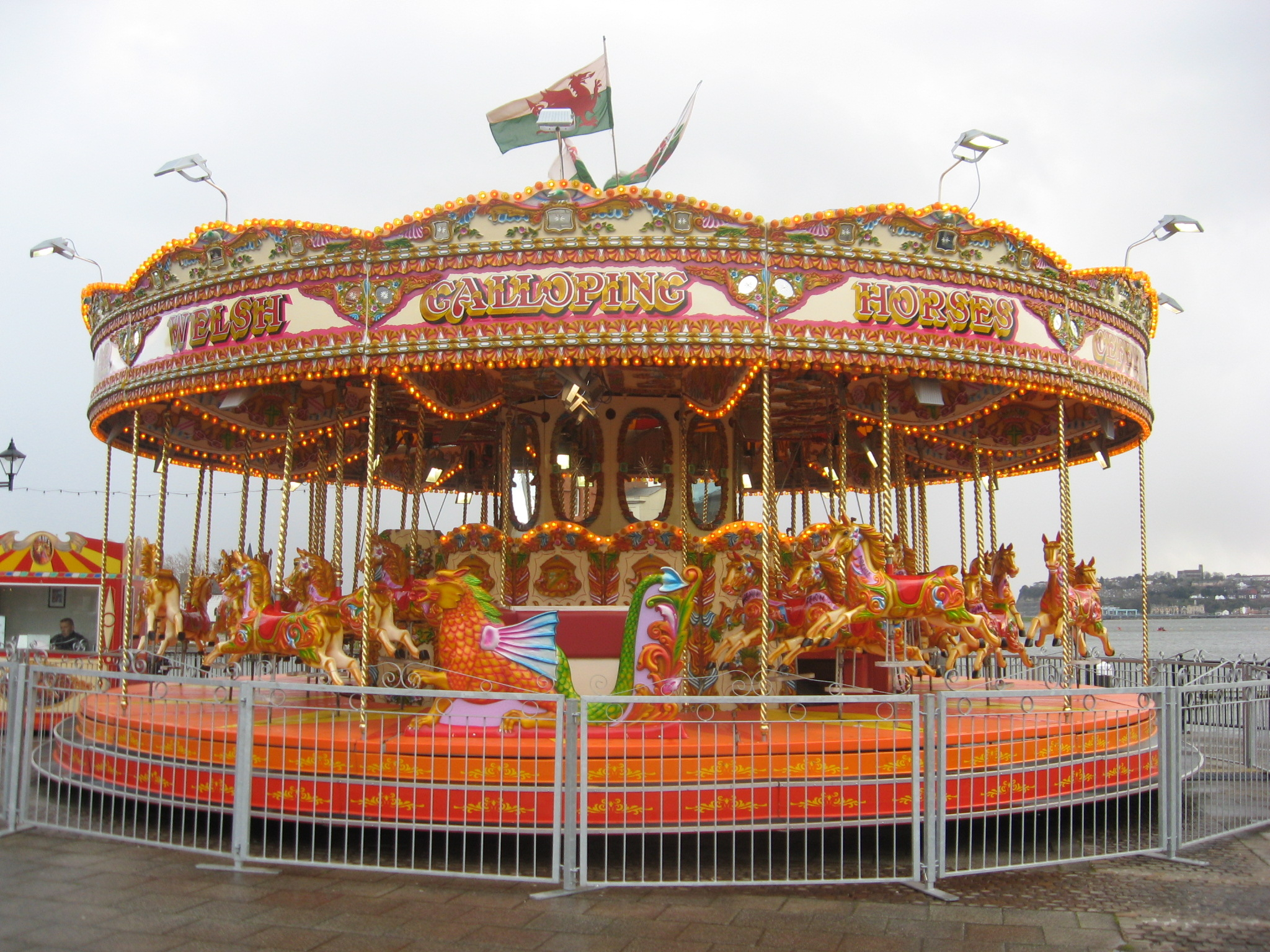
Carousel

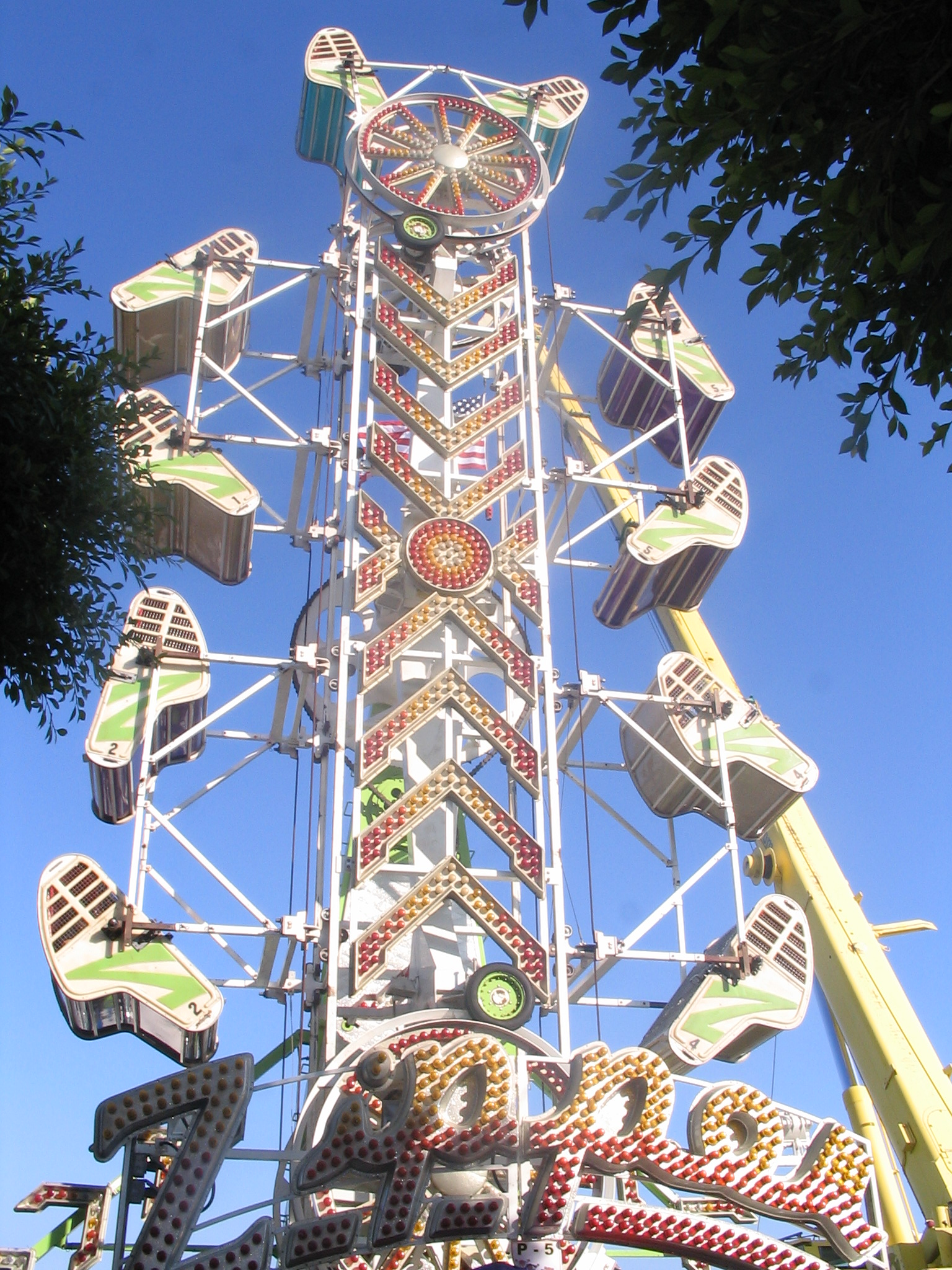
Zipper

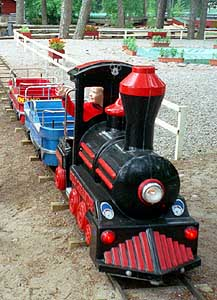
Kiddie train ride

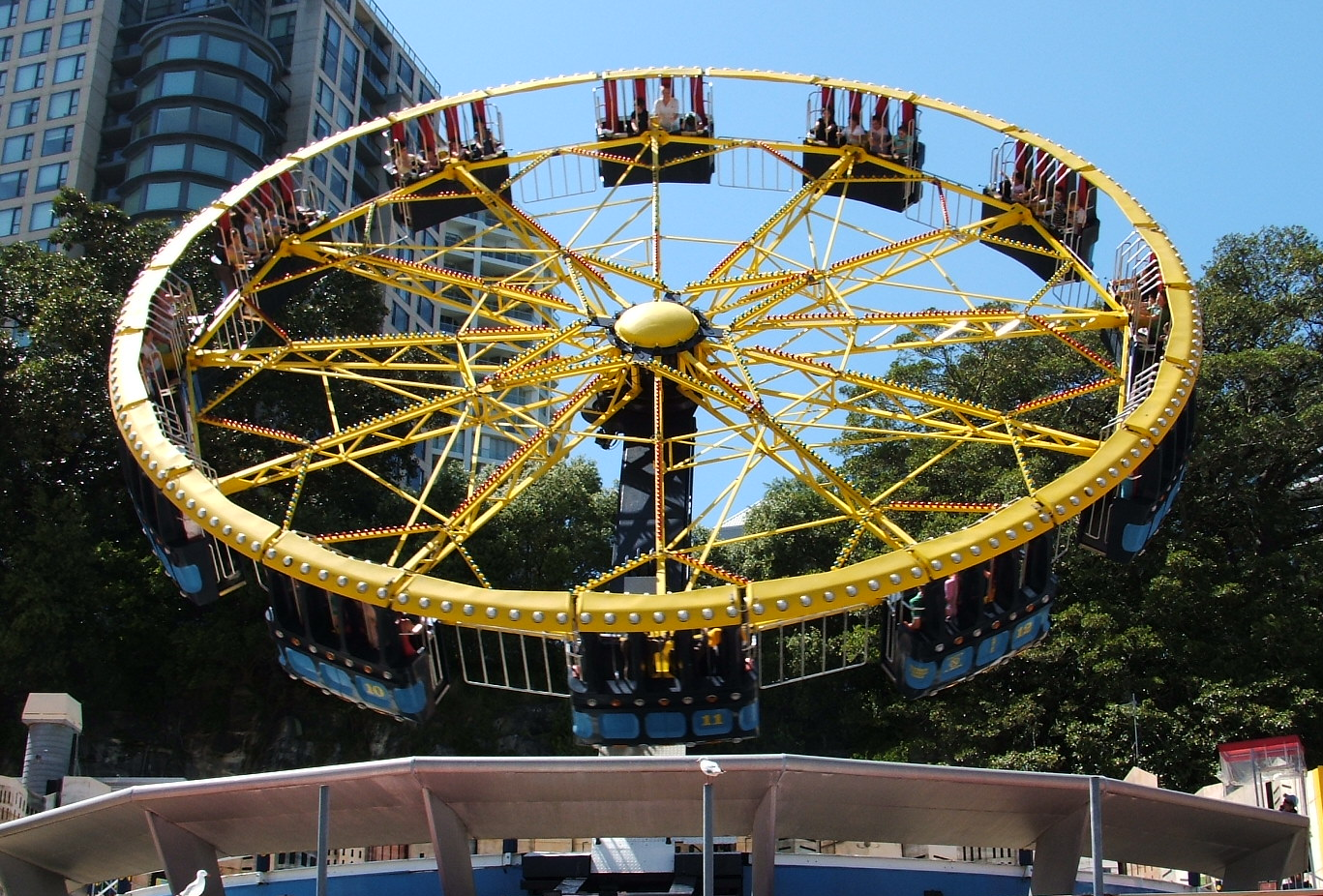
UFO ride

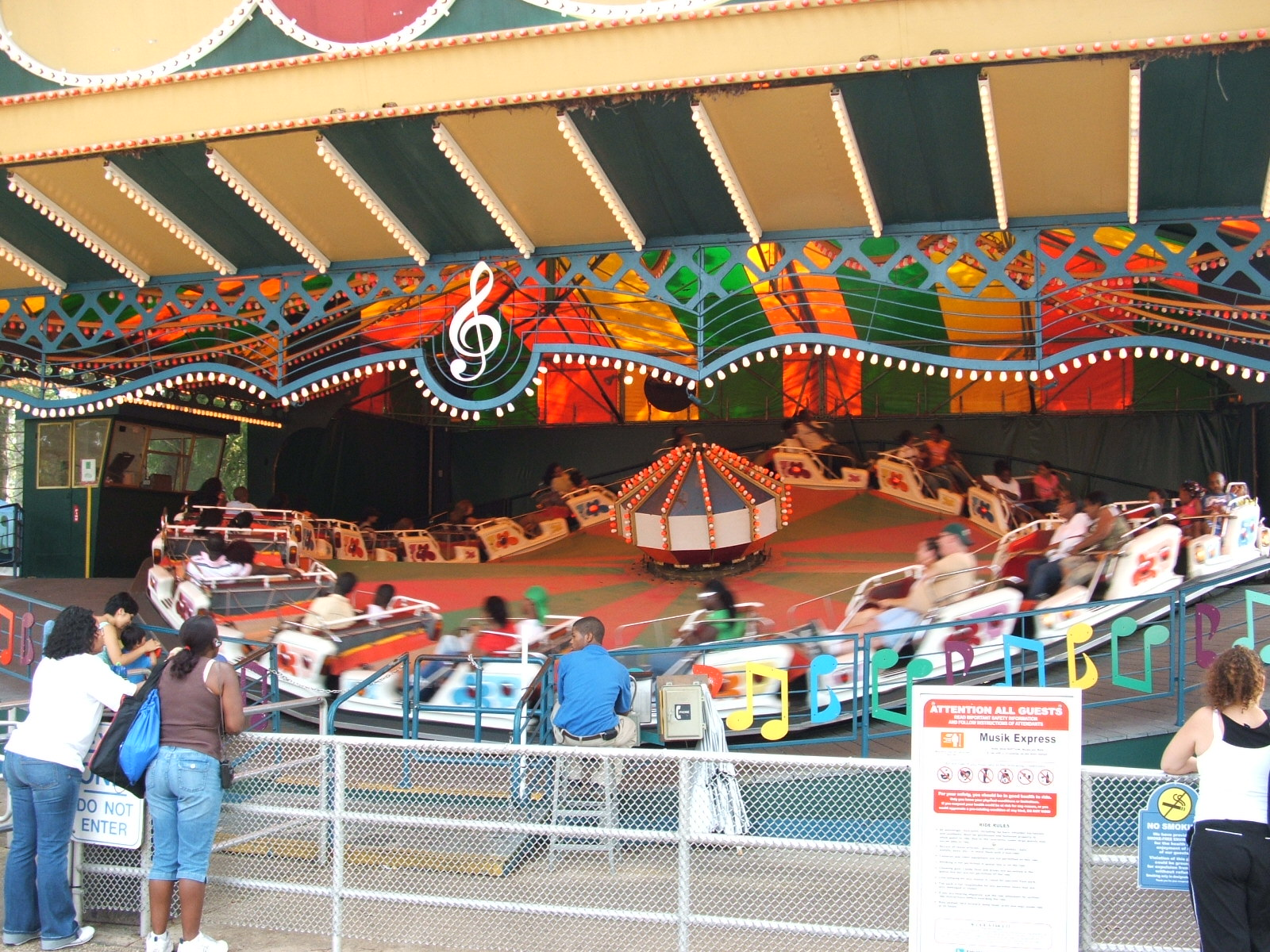
Music Express

ferris wheel and Star Flyer

== Sideshows ==
In the past, many traveling carnivals also had a sideshow that accompanied them. Admission to see these curiosities or exhibits required an extra fee. Some sideshows featured a single exhibit, but some had multiple acts or exhibits under one tent (slang term: Ten-in-One).

Human acts may include people with multiple arms or legs, midgets, extremely tall people, obese people, people born with facial or other deformities, and tattooed people. The term used for this type of show was called a freak show. Animal oddities, such as the two-headed calf, the miniature horse, etc., were featured in the freak show as well. Changing public opinions and increased medical knowledge have led to a decline of these types of shows.

Another type of act at the sideshow was the thrill act. Examples of these acts included fire eaters, sword swallowers, the human blockhead, the human pin cushion, and knife throwers. Some of these types of acts, such as the human fountain, were later found to be fakes. Daredevil shows like the globe of death, which features motorcycles performing inside an enclosed sphere, or a high diving act were sometimes included. Burlesque shows (slang term: kootch shows) were also part of the traveling carnival for a time as well. Displays like Bonnie and Clyde's death car or Hitler's staff car were also seen at some traveling carnivals.

== See also ==
- All Hallows Guild Carousel, an antique traveling carousel
- Musée des Arts Forains (The Funfair Museum), in Paris, France
