= Stock catalyst =

A stock catalyst is an event that causes the price of a security to move, often significantly. In a simplified sense, it can be either bad news that unnerves investors or good news to get investors interested in the stock again. Stock catalysts often change investor sentiment and can mark the beginning or end of stock trends. The most common catalysts arise due to unexpected information that triggers the market to re-consider a company's business prospects. Some investors and traders use catalysts in short-term trading strategies to generate a profit.

== Types ==
A stock catalyst can be either a sudden catalyst or an anticipated catalyst. Sudden catalysts cannot be anticipated and are announced suddenly by the company during a press release. An example of a sudden catalyst is a company partnership since they are announced without prior notice to investors. Anticipated catalysts are catalysts that investors are aware of before the catalyst even happens. They are generally pre-scheduled and can have a strong effect on a company's stock price during the days leading up to and including the event.

== Examples ==
The following are examples of stock catalysts:

- Earnings release
- Investor Conference
- Product Release
- FDA/CDC Approval
- Economic Event
- Metric Reveal
- Court Decision
- Corporate Action
- IPO
- IPO Lockup Expiration
- Partnership
- Contracts
- Analyst Revisions

== Trading strategies ==
=== Buy the Rumor, Sell the News ===
The trading strategy around buying the rumor and selling the news revolves around buying or selling the stock during the 3 weeks leading up to the catalyst event, and selling before the event actually occurs. This strategy can be predicable because the stock market will price in rumors around the catalyst in the days leading up to the event. If the catalyst is expected to be positive, then the company stock is also expected to rise in the weeks leading up to the event.

=== Trade the Catalyst ===
Another trading strategy related to stock catalysts is buying or selling the stock and maintaining that position during the catalyst event. This is a highly speculative and risky strategy due to the unpredictability of catalyst events such as earnings releases.
