= Katalyst =

Katalyst may refer to:

- Katalyst (DJ), Australian DJ and producer
- Katalyst Media, a television production company founded by Ashton Kutcher and Jason Goldberg
- Katalyst Space Technologies, a US-based spacecraft manufacturer
