= The Catalyst (American newspaper) =

Student newspaper of Colorado College

- Type: Weekly newspaper
- Format: Broadsheet
- Owner: Cutler Publications
- Headquarters: 1028 Weber Street, Colorado Springs, Colorado, CO 80903, United States
- Website: thecatalystnews.com

The Catalyst is an American weekly newspaper published by students of Colorado College Friday mornings of the school year in Colorado Springs, Colorado. The Catalyst is the official and only student newspaper of Colorado College and has a print circulation of roughly 1,500 and is circulated on the college's campus and in downtown Colorado Springs. The Catalyst consists of five sections: News, Sports, Active Life, Life, and Opinion.

The newspaper was preceded by The Tiger newspaper, started in 1898. In 1969 after controversy over alleged vulgarity and obscenity, a non-profit (Cutler Publications) was established to ensure an independent paper could be published by students and The Catalyst was born.

The newspaper was instrumental in the Foundation for Individual Rights in Education's (FIRE) case on Colorado College's uniquely limited freedom of speech. FIRE had named Colorado College on its Red Alert list for several years over its treatment of two students who distributed a satirical flyer which parodied the college's Feminist and Gender Studies newsletter. Three articles in The Catalyst were cited by FIRE.

During the Federal Aviation Administration's highly publicized investigation of a group of Colorado College students in 2012, the FAA, as well as several media outlets, including the Associated Press, cited The Catalyst's reporting on the investigation. The small weekly's editor at the time, Jesse Paul, broke the news of the investigation.

The paper's editors resigned in 2002 after controversy over an April 1 parody with stereotyped depictions of black and Asian people.

Colorado College has a Journalism Institute, and students in a class on covering wildfires met with Colorado governor Jared Polis.

In 2025, a student reporter at the paper won a $1,000 scholarship award. Journalist and author Corey Hutchins teaches at the school.
