= The Catalyst (nightclub) =

Nightclub in Santa Cruz, California, US

Coordinates: 36.97134°N 122.02560°W

The Catalyst is a nightclub located at 1011 Pacific Avenue in Santa Cruz, California. The club has hosted big-name artists such as Neil Young, Pearl Jam, Tom Petty and the Heartbreakers, Emmylou Harris, Phish, Iggy Pop, and Nirvana. The Catalyst was also a venue where local bands could achieve popularity. Some of the local bands in the 1970s were Snail, Oganookie, and Jango.

The Catalyst moved to its current location in 1976 from within the St. George Hotel on Front Street. The main hall is 5,000 square feet (460 m^{2}) and can hold 800 people.

Randall Kane opened the original site in 1969, and ran the Catalyst until 2003.

In July 2025 the property was put up for sale, but the Club General Manager said the Catalyst lease is through 2028 and they intended to keep operating the club as long as they can.

By May 2026, the property was bought by GSH Ventures, "a multinational real estate firm and developer. The properties were listed for sale for $4.5 million last year after its longtime owners decided to sell." GHS Ventures has a current plan to "demolish nonresidential buildings and residential units, combine three lots into one, and construct a 7-story mixed-use building with 64 residential condominium units". In other words, to demolish the Catalyst.

In response to its sale, local educator and activist Hector Marin created a digital petition to give voice to the feelings of the Santa Cruz community that the Catalyst should be preserved as a "historical preservation cultural landmark" with the goal of preventing its demolition. The petition has received more than 11,000 signatures, and received a formal response from Santa Cruz Mayor Fred Keeley:

The City of Santa Cruz recognizes the important role The Catalyst has played in our music and cultural scene, and we understand why there is strong public interest in its future.

It is important to clarify the City's role. The City is not involved in negotiations between the developer and The Catalyst, and the City cannot require that a private business remain in a specific location or be included in a future development. These decisions are governed largely by private negotiations, not City Council discretion.

Some have asked whether a historic designation could stop the proposed project. Under California law, it would not. Historic designation does not automatically prevent demolition, and in this case would not change the City's authority over the proposal due to the project's status under state law.

The Catalyst as a business is a cultural institution, but the building itself, is aging and in poor condition, as acknowledged by the venue's management. The City's Economic Development team is in communication with The Catalyst to explore ways to support the business and help it continue operating. The proposed project does show The Catalyst as a potential future tenant, should the developer and business reach agreement.

— Fred Keeley

Another ongoing effort to retain the Catalyst as a local music venue is being facilitated by entrepreneurs Jay Brown and Jeremy Stone in an initiative to buy back the Catalyst as a community-owned venue. The site reports that by September 2026 more than $1 million had been pledged by over 2,000 people.
