= Morningstar Analyst Rating =

The Morningstar Analyst Rating debuted in 2011 as a qualitative rating assigned by Morningstar's team of manager research analysts for funds under their coverage. This forward-looking metric is analyst-driven, and is considered an aptitude test of a fund manager's capabilities in a specific strategy. The Morningstar Analyst Rating reflects the analyst insight and opinion on how the capabilities of the strategy will perform in the future. The rating is based on interviews with fund management and principal analyst research on the people, process, and philosophy of the firm.

According to The Wall Street Journal, “Funds will receive a gold, silver, bronze, neutral or negative designation.” Until late 2019, "the rating was based on five separately rated pillars—Parent, People, Performance, Price, and Process—which were then combined. Now Price and Performance have been wrapped into the other pillars." according to Barron's.

Ratings are reassessed for significant changes every 12–15 months.
