= Catalyst Conference =

- Frequency: Annual
- Locations: Atlanta, Georgia; Dallas, Texas; Irvine, California; Washington D.C., etc.
- Years active: 17
- Attendance: 13,000
- Organizer: Catalyst Leader, LLC
- People: Andy Stanley; Craig Groeschel; Malcolm Gladwell; John Piper; Francis Chan; Patrick Lencioni; Hillsong United
- Website: http://catalystconference.com/

The Catalyst Conference (or simply Catalyst) is a series of leadership conferences focused on a new generation of church leaders.

== About Catalyst ==
Catalyst was conceived as a next-generation leaders conference in 1999 by Andy Stanley, Reggie Joiner, John Maxwell, Lanny Donoho and other young leaders. The Catalyst Conference takes place annually in Atlanta, Georgia, United States, at the Infinite Energy Arena. It is 2–3 days long. Every year Catalyst hosts groups and individuals from nearly all denominations and more than 5,000 churches and faith-based organizations. Andy Stanley, Christine Caine, Robert Madu, Craig Groeschel, Matt Redman spoke at Catalyst in 2014. The conference is a nondenominational Christian event. More than 13,000 people attended Catalyst at the Infinite Energy Arena in 2013.

== Catalyst Conferences ==
Catalyst Conferences were held annually in major cities across the United States. The focus of the events were around worship and leadership development. The conference theme usually kicked off in Atlanta, Georgia, United States at the formerly named Infinite Energy Arena. Each year the event focused on a key leadership theme with opening and closing worship music and main session events during the day. The conference sessions covered various lectures and interview formats.

The Catalyst Conference goal is to provide individuals with applicable leadership content and memorable experiences that impact their home, church, and work.
