= Economic catalyst =

An economic catalyst is an entrepreneur, company, system, invention, or policy that precipitates a fundamental change in business or technology. A more precise definition of a catalyst is based on the new economics of multi-sided platforms. In this literature an "economic catalyst" is an entity that has (a) two or more groups of customers; (b) who need each other in some way; but (c) can't capture the value from their mutual attraction on their own; and (d) rely on the catalyst to facilitate value-reaction reactions between them. For-profit businesses, joint ventures, cooperatives, standard-setting bodies, and governments operate catalysts.

The payment card industry illustrates the concept. Diners Club was the first modern payment card, introduced in 1950. To create this product Diners Club had to get two groups of customers on board: (1) Consumers who wanted to pay with a card and (2) merchants who wanted to accept payment with this card. These two groups of customers each wanted the card to consummate transactions between them. Any type of dating environment also exemplifies economic catalyst. A nightclub needs men and women and facilitates their meeting and interacting.

Catalysts are the businesses at the heart of the new economics of two-sided markets. They are multi-sided platforms.
