= Alchemy Catalyst =

Localization tool

Alchemy CATALYST
- Developer: Alchemy Software Development Limited
- Stable release: Alchemy CATALYST 2019
- Website: www.alchemysoftware.com

Alchemy CATALYST is a software internationalization and localization suite which is developed by Alchemy Software Development Limited.

== History ==
Alchemy Software Development Limited was founded by Enda McDonnell and Tony O’Dowd, who were the original developers of Corel Catalyst. It acquired the Corel Catalyst software which was initially owned by Corel Corporation, in a deal which saw Corel gain a stake of 24.9% equity interest in the newly formed company. On March 6, 2008 Alchemy Software development merged with Translations.com, a provider of software localisation and Globalization Management system technology. The headquarters of Alchemy Software Development Limited are located in Dublin. The company also has offices located in Japan, Germany and the United States. Catalyst 2019 was released in December 2018.

== Alchemy CATALYST 2019 ==
Alchemy CATALYST is a visual software localisation tool and was one of the first tools that contained integrated translation memory technology. The latest version of Alchemy CATALYST version 2019 was released on December 11, 2018. Alchemy CATALYST 2019 is an Object Oriented localization environment.
