= Longplay (video games) =

Play-through of a video game, with the intent of completing it as fully as possible

A longplay is a play-through of a video game, created with the intent of completing it as fully as possible, mainly for the purposes of nostalgia, preservation, and possibly as a walkthrough. For people who are unable or unwilling to play a certain game, yet wish to know and experience its story, a longplay can be viewed simply as a long digitally animated movie. A longplay is distinct from a Let's Play, in that there is typically little to no commentary on the game by the player.

The defining characteristic of a longplay when compared to a speedrun is that few shortcuts, if any, are taken to finish the game. Dull moments may be ultimately edited out of the final video, and sidequests may be ignored, but in general every task necessary to reach the end is recorded, including cutscenes. Also unlike speedruns, there is no time constraint aside from those imposed by bandwidth/filesize concerns.

== Creation ==
Games may be recorded in several ways: using screencast software, a feature built into an emulator, or via a video capture device connected to a console or another computer. Some games (for example, Doom) have a demo recording feature built into the game.

== Neologism status ==
"Speedrun" and "game replay" emerged in recent years as a subset of "play-through" and gained popularity by being entertaining and competitive while needing only minutes of video. Video sharing websites accelerated their acceptance. Advances in consumer recording equipment, codecs, hard drive space, and internet services were necessary before complete games could reasonably be saved and shared.

Outside of the communities specializing in the practice, "longplay" is relatively unknown, though understood from context. The ambiguous umbrella term "play-through" is widely used instead.

== History ==
The term "Longplay" was first introduced by the German computer magazine "64’er – Das Magazin für Computerfans" in the late 1980s. Each issue from 4/89 to 10/94 had a section in which a walkthrough of a more complex or difficult video game was described in detail. These so-called "Longplays" can be considered early printed versions of let's plays, a later form of live commenting while videorecording a video game. In 2002 – before the rise of online video platforms – the German video game documentarist Reinhard Klinksiek started a project in which he wanted to preserve videos of classical video games (mainly for the C64) and make them accessible on the internet. In search for a simple name he adopted the neologistic term "Longplay" from the "64’er" magazines, which he had read as a teenager. After the release of more than 600 "longplay"-recordings of classical video games, the term was adopted by the gaming community internationally and is occasionally used by Online-Videogame-Magazines.

== See also ==
- Video game walkthrough
