= Lowtax =

Lowtax may refer to:

- Byron (Low Tax) Looper (1964–2013), American politician and convicted murderer
- Richard "Lowtax" Kyanka (1976–2021), American internet personality and former owner of the website Something Awful
