= UHS =

UHS may refer to:

== Education ==
- University of Health Sciences (disambiguation), various entities
- University of Houston System, a system of higher education in the U.S. state of Texas with four universities
- Utica High School (Michigan), a high school located in Utica, Michigan
- Utica High School (Ohio), a high school located in Utica, Ohio
- University High School (disambiguation), a number of high schools
- Unionville High School (Ontario), located in Markham, Ontario, Canada
- Unionville High School (Kennett Square, Pennsylvania), in Chester County, Pennsylvania
- Union High School (Camas, Washington) a High School in Camas, Washington
- Underwood High School in Underwood, North Dakota
- Urbandale High School, a high school in Urbandale, Iowa

== Business and industry ==
- Universal Health Services, Fortune 500 company

== Science and technology ==
- Uhs, the symbol for the hypothetical and highly unstable chemical element Unhexseptium, predicted beyond the "island of stability" in the extended periodic table
- Ultra High Speed, a speed designation for SD cards
- Underground hydrogen storage, a way to store hydrogen in caverns, salt domes or depleted oil and gas fields
- Uncombable hair syndrome, a rare genetic condition

== Other uses ==
- Unified Handicapping System, a handicap system in the sport of golf, used in the United Kingdom and Republic of Ireland
- United Health Services, a health care system serving the Greater Binghamton, N.Y., region
- Universal Hint System, a form of strategy guide for computer and video games
- University Hospital Southampton NHS Foundation Trust, an NHS organisation in Southampton, UK
- University Hospitals Sussex NHS Foundation Trust, an NHS organisation in Sussex, UK
