= Ali Kaya =

Ali Kaya may refer to:

- Ali Kaya (athlete) (born 1994), Turkish long-distance runner of Kenyan origin
- Ali Kaya (serial killer) (born 1978), Turkish serial killer
