= Chuggaaconroy =

American YouTuber (born 1990)

- Chuggaaconroy at PAX West 2018
- Born: Emiliano Rodolfo Rosales-Birou; April 8, 1990 (age 36); Phoenix, Arizona, U.S.
- Occupations: Internet personality; Let's Player

YouTube information
- Channel: chuggaaconroy
- Years active: 2008–present
- Genres: Gaming; let's play; walkthrough
- Subscribers: 1.25 million
- Views: 1.31 billion
- Last updated: August 19, 2026

Emiliano Rodolfo Rosales-Birou (born April 8, 1990), also known as Emile Rosales and better known by his online alias Chuggaaconroy or Chugga for short, (Note: His channel username is stylized in lowercase as chuggaaconroy.) is an American YouTuber, Internet personality and Let's Player. Starting his online career in 2008, Rosales-Birou is most notable for his comprehensive walkthrough videos on various video games released on Nintendo platforms, including titles from the Mother, Super Mario, The Legend of Zelda, Pikmin, Pokémon, and Xenoblade series.

Alongside his Let's Play videos, Rosales-Birou is a founding member of the collaborative Let's Play YouTube channel The Runaway Guys with fellow Let's Play personalities Proton Jon and NintendoCapriSun. The group's content consists of playthroughs of various multiplayer video games, including Mario Party and New Super Mario Bros.

== Early life ==
Rosales-Birou was born on April 8, 1990, and is a native of Phoenix, Arizona. He later moved to an apartment in Conyers, Georgia in 2012, and later a house in Atlanta where he resided as of 2019. Rosales-Birou had been a member of the EarthBound video game community fan-site Starmen.net as a teenager, where he met fellow content creator and collaborator Stephen Georg; Georg had mentioned how Rosales-Birou had introduced him to the Let's Play genre and inspired him to make his own gaming channel.

== YouTube career ==
=== History (2008–present) ===
Rosales-Birou created his YouTube account on July 26, 2006, under the alias of "Chuggaaconroy," a name he has used as an online pseudonym since he was a child. He was initially inspired to make Let's Plays by personalities such as Claire Wheeler (better known as "Proton Jon"), a Let's Player originating from the Something Awful forums and an eventual founding member of The Runaway Guys. He uploaded his first Let's Play series on March 26, 2008, covering the SNES role-playing game EarthBound on YouTube, adding commentary on the game's sound and art design. He would later upload Let's Play videos on the other games in the Mother series.

In July 2010, Rosales-Birou's YouTube account was suspended under false copyright claims, though was restored in August. Timothy Bishop (NintendoCapriSun), a Let's Player and eventual founding member of The Runaway Guys, also had his account suspended at the same time. Also in 2010, Rosales-Birou obtained a YouTube partnership with The Game Station (later named Polaris), a sub-network of Maker Studios. Nintendo had initially targeted and content ID-claimed several of Rosales-Birou's videos in early 2013 due to them containing footage of their games, causing his ad revenue to temporarily decrease, but later ceased doing so.

Rosales-Birou's channel grew in popularity as his gameplay videos were often recommended on YouTube's suggestions, and he has since become a Let's Play creator on YouTube as a full-time job; in 2014 The Atlantic cited Rosales-Birou as an example of a Let's Player making a living off of gaming videos. On his primary YouTube channel, Rosales-Birou has produced over 50 solo Let's Play series of games primarily exclusive to Nintendo systems, such as EarthBound, Paper Mario: The Thousand-Year Door, Pikmin, Super Mario Galaxy, (Note: Called Super Luigi Galaxy due to him playing the game in the Luigi portion (accessed by collecting 120 Power Stars).) The Legend of Zelda: Majora's Mask, Pokémon Emerald, Super Paper Mario, Super Mario 64 DS, Animal Crossing: New Leaf, Xenoblade Chronicles, and Splatoon.

In 2018, Rosales-Birou remade his EarthBound Let's Play series on the tenth anniversary of his YouTube channel's formation, going into detail on previously undiscussed trivia and knowledge surrounding the game. He had previously expressed interest in remaking the series, feeling that he "could have done such a better job now." In June 2021, several of Rosales-Birou’s EarthBound videos were content ID-claimed and subsequently blocked worldwide by Sony, due to the company owning the distribution rights to the soundtrack of the Mother series, but were later restored with help from The Completionist.

The timeframes for Rosales-Birou's Let's Play series for Xenoblade Chronicles and Xenoblade Chronicles 2 each coincided with the announcements of Xenoblade series characters as playable fighters in the Super Smash Bros. series; those being Shulk in Super Smash Bros. for Nintendo 3DS / Wii U, and Pyra & Mythra in Super Smash Bros. Ultimate as paid DLC.

=== Commentary and video style ===
Rosales-Birou's gaming videos have been categorized under the walkthrough genre, and have been described as both entertaining and informative. Contrasting from other Let's Play channels, his content focuses on footage from Nintendo games several years after their initial release dates, mainly of titles he has played numerous times before. During his gameplay videos, Rosales-Birou attempts to show every aspect of each individual game he plays to 100% completion, including every item, boss battle, sidequest, and Easter egg possible.

Rosales-Birou commentates in an informative manner in his videos with the purpose of guiding viewers to complete the game themselves. For example, in his Pokémon Emerald series he discusses various strategies and viable techniques to ensure optimal success in the game, and in his second EarthBound series he showcased a particular glitch in the game involving the Tent located in Threed, one of the cities featured in the game. In this regard, his gameplay videos function as informative walkthroughs with the premise of guiding players through each aspect of the specific game he plays; Ryan Rigney from Wired magazine noted that Rosales-Birou "possesses a near encyclopedic knowledge about the games he's playing, and reliably dispenses gobs of obscure information as he plays."

In spite of their informative nature, Rosales-Birou's videos often employ humorous moments in his gameplay, such as the occasional failure or death in a level and subsequent backtracking. His videos have also been described as nostalgic and reflective, as he often tells personal anecdotes of his experiences with the games he plays.

=== The Runaway Guys ===
TheRunawayGuys
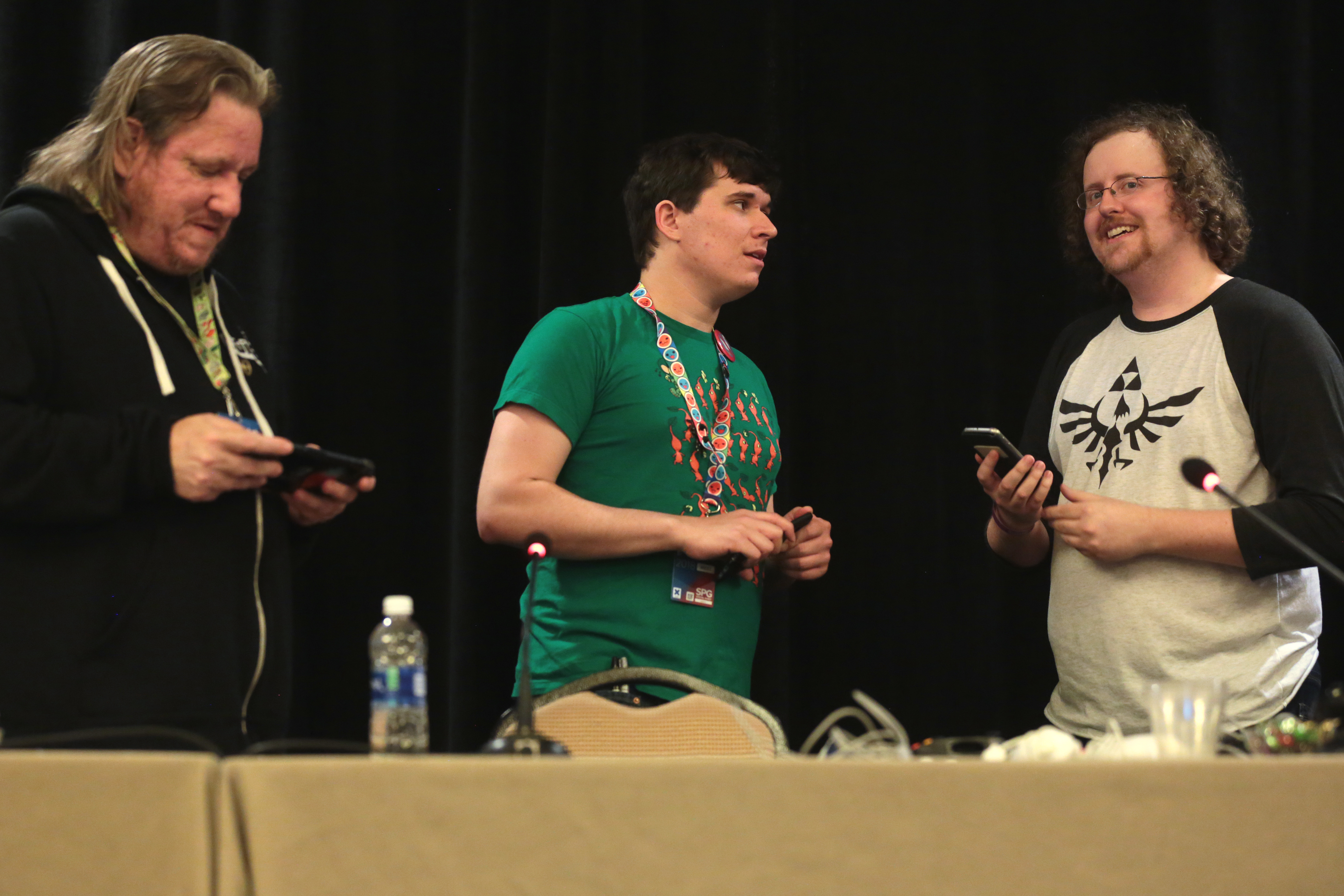
- The Runaway Guys at PAX West 2018. From left to right: NintendoCapriSun, Chuggaaconroy and Proton Jon (who was still Jon at the time)

YouTube information
- Channel: TheRunawayGuys
- Years active: 2011–present
- Genres: Gaming; let's play
- Subscribers: 478 thousand
- Views: 428 million
- Last updated: July 1, 2025

The Runaway Guys is a collaborative Let's Play channel formed by Rosales-Birou, Claire Wheeler (Proton Jon) and Timothy Bishop (NintendoCapriSun). The group records themselves playing various multiplayer video games such as Mario Party, New Super Mario Bros. Wii, Kirby & the Amazing Mirror and Wheel of Fortune. In addition to their videos, The Runaway Guys also host the Thrown Controllers event, a live game show which focuses on video game trivia and challenges. The event has been broadcast on numerous gaming conventions such as PAX, Magfest and Momocon.

From 2018 to 2024, the group did gaming live-streams (primarily on Wheeler's Twitch channel) for charity, hosting The Runaway Guys Colosseum stream for the non-profit organization Direct Relief. Guests who collaborated with the group on the stream included YouTube personalities Tom Fawkes, JoshJepson, MasaeAnela, StephenPlays and FamilyJules (who served as one of the group's musical talents). The Completionist also collaborated with the group on the stream prior to the charity fraud allegations surrounding him in 2023. On January 17, 2025, it was announced The Runaway Guys Colosseum had been retired.

== Other works ==
In 2014, Rosales-Birou appeared in an episode of Did You Know Gaming? to explain trivia on the EarthBound franchise. He had also collaborated with YouTuber TheJWittz in a video discussing theories on the Pokémon character Giovanni from Team Rocket.

In 2012, he appeared in an episode of The Game Station Podcast hosted by British YouTuber TotalBiscuit.

In June 2022, Rosales-Birou attended the Games Done Quick event Summer Games Done Quick and served as a couch commentator for a speedrun of Xenoblade Chronicles 2: Torna – The Golden Country by notable speed-runner Enel.

== Public image ==
Rosales-Birou's Let's Play videos have been received positively. Jennifer O'Connell from The Irish Times noted Rosales-Birou's content as a family-friendly alternative to more vulgar YouTubers, and Noel Murray from The New York Times cited him as an example of a YouTuber "less interested in personal branding than in sharing their (his) enthusiasm." Stephen Adegun of Reporter had given his content praise for its informative nature, stating that "while watching one of his series of playthroughs, viewers can doubtlessly come away having learned something new about the game, even if they knew a lot about it already."

Rosales-Birou has also appeared in various lists of the best gaming YouTube channels. Rosales-Birou's YouTube channel name was featured as a cheat code for the 2019 Metroidvania game Bloodstained: Ritual of the Night, alongside other prominent internet personalities. In 2020, Rosales-Birou's Super Mario Sunshine Let's Play was listed as one of the top ten memes of the game following the release of Super Mario 3D All-Stars, which featured a high-definition port of Super Mario Sunshine.

Rosales-Birou's YouTube channel reached 1 million subscribers and 760 million views in 2015, and is at over 1.25 million subscribers and 1.29 billion views as of 2026.

== Filmography ==
=== Web series ===
Year	Title	Role	Notes
2008–present	Chuggaaconroy	Himself	3,059 episodes
2011–present	TheRunawayGuys	Himself	2,107 episodes
2014	Did You Know Gaming?	Himself	1 episode (EarthBound)
2018–2023	The Runaway Guys Colosseum	Himself	Stream for Direct Relief

== See also ==
- List of YouTubers
- Let's Play
- EarthBound fandom
