= Bakırköy Psychiatric Hospital =

- Ministry of Health
- Location of Bakırköy Psychiatric Hospital in Istanbul.

Geography
- Location: Bakırköy, Istanbul, Turkey
- Coordinates: 40.98944°N 28.86194°E

Organisation
- Type: Research, teaching and general
- Affiliated university: Health Sciences University

History
- Founded: October 15, 1924; 102 years ago

Links
- Website: www.bakirkoyruhsinir.gov.tr
- Lists: Hospitals in Turkey

Bakırköy Psychiatric Hospital, short for Bakırköy Mazhar Osman Mental Health and Neurological Diseases Education and Research Hospital (Turkish: Bakırköy Prof. Dr. Mazhar Osman Ruh Sağlığı ve Sinir Hastalıkları Eğitim Araştırma Hastanesi), is a mental health hospital of the Health Ministry located in Bakırköy district of Istanbul, Turkey. The hospital is named after Mazhar Osman, who is also considered the founder of modern psychiatry in Turkey.

== History ==
It was established with the initiative of Dr. Mazhar Osman (1884–1951) and approval of Minister of Health Refik Saydam (1881–1942) in the premises of Reşadiye Barracks at Bakırköy, Istanbul on October 15, 1924. It was an extension of Toptaşı Asylum, which was situated inside the Atik Valide Complex in Üsküdar on the Asian side of the city. After the completion of the mental hospital in Bakırköy on June 15, 1927, and transfer of all the inpatients, Toptaşı Asylum closed.

The facility in Bakırköy was initially named Istanbul Hospital of Mental Disorders and Neurology (Turkish: İstanbul Emraz-ı Akliye ve Asabiye Hastanesi). The hospital was further developed by Fahrettin Kerim Gökay (1900–1987), Şükrü Hazım Tiner, Ahmet Şükrü Emed and İhsan Şükrü Aksel (1899–1987), who all were students of Mazhar Osman. Main departments of the hospital was psychiatry, neurology and neurosurgery. Mazhar Osman, who served as the hospital's chief physician until 1940, is the first in Turkey to apply brain surgery.

With worsening of the economic situation in Turkey during the 1940s, the number of patients rose from 3,000 up to 5,000. Due to insufficient state budget, no other institutions could be established. These conditions led to the circumstance that many inpatients had to share the same beds. As a result, the mortality in the hospital increased.

The hospital complex underwent structural improvements such as in landscaping and renovation of the buildings. The inner courtyard was encircled by a 4,000 m (13,000 ft)–long wall. A copy of Auguste Rodin's famous statue The Thinker was placed inside the courtyard, which became a symbol of psychiatry in Turkey. A second storey was added to some of wards.

In the 1960s, modern psychiatry methods were put into service. Inpatients were inspired to join newly established various workshops for handcraft and outdoor sporting activities. Three types of treatment conditions were formed as open door, semi-open door and closed door services. As a remedy to the existing problem of overcapacity bedding, a mental health dispensary was opened in Istanbul, which was followed by more units throughout the city in later years.

In the 1980s, emphasis was placed on outpatient services by founding an outpatient psychiatric therapy unit as a countermeasure to the increasing number of patients. The number of inpatients could be held limited through shortened bedding time by speedy examination and effective treatment, as well as discharge of patients with better conditions outside. Efforts of the Chief physician Yıldırım Aktuna (1930–2007) in fundraising played a major role in the improvement of the hospital's treatment and healthcare facilities. In addition, scientific activities were initiated also in the hospital.

In the 1990s, the scientific work, which began in the former decade, continued when new services and equipment were introduced diversifying the specialization areas in psychiatry, neurology and neurosurgery. The "International Bakırköy Days" were organized and brought to international level up.

=== Today ===
The 2000s saw the establishment of many new units such as the centers for mood disorder, drug addiction therapy, sleep and epilepsy research and psychotic disorder as well as therapy and training centers for children and adolescents, for adolescents and young adults.

Currently, the Bakırköy Psychiatric Hospital is the country's largest and most developed health facility for mental disorders and neurology. It is also an important scientific institution in clinic research. Physician assistants are educated in the neurology clinic since the department's foundation in 1927. Ten academic staff personnel serve in the neurology clinic.

Within the radiology department, which specialises in the sub-speciality of neuroradiology, conventional and multi-parametric magnetic resonance imaging procedures are carried out for neurological conditions. Furthermore, the BRSHH Radiodiagnostics Laboratory, which forms part of the radiology department, plays an active role in academic research.

== Museum ==
The hospital hosts a museum opened in 2008. It offers the history of the hospital with documents and photographs in chronological order. Personal belongings of Mazhar Osman, his books and a surgery logbook of him from 1934 are on display. Among other exhibits are a straitjacket, used to restrain a patient from causing harm to himself or others, an electroshock device used in electroconvulsive therapy and drug bottles used in early years.

The museum is open to public on weekdays between 10:00 and 15:30 hours local time, and admission is free of charge.

== Notable patients ==
- Afife Jale (1902–1941), actress
- Ayhan Kartal (1966–2000), rapist and child killer
- Yavuz Yapıcıoğlu (born 1967), serial killer
- Billy Hayes (writer)
