= Play-through =

Play-through or play through may refer to:

== Sports ==
- Play through, a verb which in golfing describes the act of a faster group of golfers passing a slower group on a golf course

== Videos and video games ==
- Replay value or play-through, a video game's attribute of being playable repeatedly while still being enjoyable
- Video game walkthrough or play-through, video footage of a video game being played
