= TheRadBrad =

American YouTuber and Let's Player (born 1987)

theRadBrad
- Born: Bradley Lamar Colburn; February 10, 1987 (age 39); Tuscaloosa, Alabama, U.S.
- Occupations: YouTuber; gamer; internet personality

YouTube information
- Channel: theRadBrad
- Years active: 2010–present
- Genres: Let's Play; video game walkthrough
- Subscribers: 14.0 million
- Views: 6.65 billion
- Last updated: June 21, 2026

Bradley Lamar Colburn (February 10, 1987), better known by his online alias theRadBrad, is an American YouTuber and Let's Player most notable for his video game walkthroughs of various new games. He has been interviewed by various publications since becoming active in 2010. As of January 2026, Colburn's channel has over 14 million subscribers and his videos have brought in over 6.6 billion views. Footage and images from his gameplay videos have been used for illustrative purposes in articles by numerous publications.

FMV Magazine has referred to Colburn as "king of the YouTube walkthrough." Additionally During a 2018 interview with Rolling Stone, Colburn's YouTube channel was identified by Susan Wojcicki, the former CEO of YouTube, as one of the "top gaming creators" on the platform.

== Career ==
Bradley Lamar Colburn was born on February 10, 1987, in Tuscaloosa, Alabama. Colburn grew up in the Tuscaloosa area until after high school. Following graduation, he attended Kennesaw State University from 2008 to 2011. While at university, Colburn studied computer science, but found himself spending his free time playing video games such as Call of Duty. This led to him starting his YouTube channel in 2010, and uploading his first video in April 2010. Colburn's channel quickly gained traction; after his first two years uploading to the site, he amassed 65 million views and nearly 180,000 subscribers, with his Dead Space 2 walkthrough being his most successful with Colburn stating his "channel doubled in size from Dead Space 2 alone". In 2013, Colburn founded tRB Productions Inc., a production company for managing his content creation. He holds the position of both CEO and secretary. From here Colburn has gone on to become one of the top gaming channels on YouTube, and as of 2026, his channel has amassed 13 million subscribers. In addition, Colburn has been covered by various publications, including VG247 (when video game publisher Ubisoft sent him merchandise ahead of the launch of Watch Dogs 2), VentureBeat, and Rolling Stone.

During a wave of copyright issues that were affecting creators, some of Colburn's videos were falsely claimed by an automated system owned by the multi-channel network Scale Lab. He was directly apologized to by Scale Lab's CEO, David Brenner, in a Kotaku interview once the problem was discovered.

== Reception and impact ==
Colburn is one of the most prominent gaming YouTube channels with his walkthrough often getting credit for their reliability. FMV Magazine described his videos as a "down-to-earth relief", adding that "he provides straight, complete playthroughs of the most popular games, his casual commentary is easy on the ears, and he lacks the overblown theatrics of his peers". Complex added Colburn's channel in a list of the best YouTubers in 2019. In 2022 the Metro.co.uk put Colburn in their list of the top 5 best walkthrough channels on YouTube stating he "consistently covers new games the exact moment they are released or sometimes gets to play them a bit early." Adding "his gameplay walkthroughs are always of the highest quality and he does regular uploads." In 2024, Twitch streamer Kai Cenat gave credit to Colburn stating "I don't know if anybody gives you flowers enough." Adding "I didn't have the money to get certain video games, he was always there for me."

== Personal life ==
Colburn is married, the couple have two children together a daughter named Clementine born in 2020, and a son Benjamin who was born in 2023.

== Filmography ==
=== Video Games ===
Year	Title	Role	Notes
2021	Oddworld: Soulstorm	Additional Slig Voice	Credited as The Rad Brad - Brad Lamar Colburn
