= Liminal States =

2012 alternate history novel

- Author: Zack Parsons
- Language: English
- Genre: Science fiction Western; Noir; Dystopia; Horror
- Publisher: Citadel Press
- Publication date: March 27, 2012
- Publication place: United States
- Media type: Print (paperback)
- Pages: 448
- ISBN: 0806533641

Liminal States is a novel by Zack Parsons, published in March 2012. The story principally follows two men, Warren Groves and Gideon Long, who become immortal in 1874 through a process they don't fully understand. Over the course of three sections, set in 1874, 1951 and 2006, the story follows their lives across an increasingly divergent alternate history America.

As part of the build-up to the novel's release, Parsons also published a related serial, "The Reificant," following an alien's encounter with the same form of immortality.

== Plot ==
The novel contains three main sections: The Builder, The Judge and The Mother, which are respectively a western, noir and science fiction/horror. They are separated by two shorter sections and supplemented by "The Reificant", a serial published in chapters between February 2 and March 23, 2012, on Something Awful, where Parsons was also a regular writer. The serial remains available to read there and at liminalstates.com.

Liminal States is divided into three main sections, the first of which, The Builder, is set in 1871. In the fictional town of Spark, New Mexico, Warren Groves is sheriff and his wife, Annie, is about to give birth to their first child. Gideon Long, the son of a local copper magnate, covets Annie and believes he can win her away from Warren. Gideon is a poor money manager and is concealing the company's financial troubles from his dying father, the tyrannical Harlan Long.

In an attempt to save his fortunes, Gideon orchestrates a train robbery that goes disastrously wrong. Left dying in the desert, Gideon is led by strange animals to a pool of white liquid located in black mountains distant from Spark. Believing its waters to be potable, Gideon tries to drink from the pool. The water's extreme properties melt his flesh, and he falls into it, briefly dying, before being reborn from it in a sac.

Not fully understanding his rebirth, Gideon returns to Spark, where he is devastated to discover that Annie Groves has died. When Gideon realizes he can't have her, he kidnaps Warren and drags him to the pool and throws him into it as punishment, thus giving him the same power of rebirth. The two men then kill each other repeatedly over a long period of time. Finally, Warren brings dynamite to the pool to destroy it over Gideon's protestations, and is only stopped after a second copy of Gideon emerges from the pool while the first Gideon is still alive.

In a short following segment, titled The Covenant and set in 1890, five living Gideons and the four living Warrens meet in secret and agree to the terms of a covenant. Among the terms are that each new copy will take a new name, abandon all aspects of his old life, and avoid contact with the other clones.

The middle third of the novel, The Judge (set in 1951), is in the first person. The narrator is Casper Cord, who has lived at least 11 previous lives. In his current life, he is a veteran of World War II and the judge of the covenant. Formerly a cop with the Los Angeles Police Department, he is now a private investigator. At the beginning of his story, he arrives at the scene of a crime in LA. The body of a woman who looks exactly like Annie Groves has been found on the side of the road, holding a piece of paper with Casper's name and phone number on it. Casper privately vows to get to the bottom of what happened to the woman.

Casper visits a doctor about a persistent cough and learns he has cancer. This is probably connected to his time spent fighting on the Home Islands of Japan. In the story's version of World War II, which Casper occasionally revisits through flashbacks, the war lasted until 1948. The Japanese refused to surrender in the face of sustained nuclear attack, and Casper was sent in with the American ground forces.

Harlan Bishop is still alive but in a state of advanced old age. He is grooming a successor Gideon, Ethan Bishop, to take over the vast business empire he has amassed. Casper doesn't fully trust the Gideons, but is also distrustful of his own clone line, believing that the Warrens are prone to dangerous and destructive behavior.

After refusing to drop the case, Casper returns to Spark and discovers the pool has been drained and its contents taken elsewhere. The section ends abruptly, when he is captured and lobotomized by the Gideons. As he cannot be killed, it is more convenient for them to "zero" him and not have to deal with him again until his body dies.

After another interstitial segment, in which a fictional president becomes aware of the clones in 1970, the story moves to the final section, The Mother. Casper Cord is reborn in 2006, in a strange place alongside many copies of himself, Gideon Long, and a woman named Veronica he met in 1951. He is sent to processing, where an unsympathetic clone of Veronica named Polly gives him a ride from the processing center to the edge of a surrounding shantytown, which surrounds the pool's new location in Los Angeles. Casper discovers that the pool has been pumping out ever greater numbers of Gideon, Warren and Veronica, who are now called types 1, 2 and 3, and that their existence is common knowledge.

History has diverged dramatically at this point, and Los Angeles is suffering from diseases and environmental blight brought through from other worlds by the pool. Casper is allowed to keep a dog that emerged with him, which turns out to contain the spirit of the Reificant, the alien narrator of the prequel serial. The Reificant warns Casper that it has seen the damage the pool has done on other planets, and that disaster will soon come to Earth.
