= Slowbeef =

American YouTuber and internet personality

- Born: Michael Sawyer

Twitch information
- Channel: slowbeef
- Years active: 2016–present
- Followers: 21.9 thousand

YouTube information
- Channel: slowbeef
- Years active: 2006–present
- Genres: Gaming; Let's play; walkthroughs
- Subscribers: 39.3 thousand
- Views: 15.8 million
- Last updated: October 29, 2024

Michael Sawyer, better known as Slowbeef, is an American YouTuber and internet personality. Originating as a member of the Something Awful forums, he is widely credited as the pioneer of the Let's Play video format. Along with Let's Play personality Diabetus, he created Retsupurae, a YouTube channel which reacts to various other Let's Play videos.

== Career ==
=== Let's Play ===
Sawyer joined the Something Awful forums during the early 2000s becoming a member after posting content on his personal website such as a commentary on Metal Gear 2: Solid Snake. Shortly after Sawyer joined the site, the practice of screen-shot Let's Play threads became common as the phrase "Let's Play" was rumored to emanate from a now deleted thread on The Oregon Trail video game. On Something Awful, he began posting threads of various obscure games which contained both informative commentary and photo captures of his gameplay, such as Dark Seed and Snatcher. In 2007, Sawyer uploaded a thread of obscure Sega Genesis game The Immortal to Something Awful. While the first page of the thread mainly consisted of text-based commentary and still screenshots, Sawyer decided to record himself playing the game on video while commentating over it, a practice inspired by directors' commentary on DVD movies. Sawyer's video on The Immortal is often cited and recognized as the first video Let's Play. Although the Let's Play genre existed amongst Something Awful forums in screenshot format, Sawyer has been credited by numerous publications and journals as the originator of the video Let's Play format. His second series on the video game Super Metroid established interactivity to the Let's Play genre; due to his inexperience with the game beforehand, he often asked Something Awful members for advice, in which viewers of the series, known as "goons" gave him tips and tricks accordingly. Sawyer has credited Something Awful personalities Proton Jon, Deceased Crab, and Psychedelic Eyeball as other pioneers of the Let's Play genre, along with Vlaphor's Let's Play thread on the video game I Have No Mouth and I Must Scream.

=== Retsupurae ===
Retsupurae is a parody channel formed by Sawyer and Something Awful member Diabetus that focused on commentating over other Let's Play videos in a humorous manner, similar to that of Mystery Science Theater 3000. Janine Hawkins of Paste Magazine discussed a Retsupurae video in which they commentated over an ASMR Let's Play video and received mildly negative attention for it compared to their other videos, stating that "much of that discussion and dissent undoubtedly came from ASMR community members eager to defend one of their own, but there are also a surprising number of comments from regular Retsupurae viewers in defense of ASMR and its 'creepy' corner of the Let's Play world."

=== Other works ===
Sawyer has also written and published articles for Polygon; his article on how Let's Plays have evolved during the course of the Internet was cited in an article discussing the stagnation of the genre by The Washington Post.

In 2008, he contributed to a fan translation of Policenauts which came to completion in 2009.

In 2022, he released an indie horror game with a small team called Atama.

Sawyer has worked as a video game programmer for various mobile phone applications.

== See also ==
- Let's Play
- Something Awful
- Video game walkthrough
