= Ali-A =

English YouTuber (born 1993)

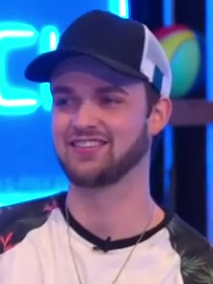
- Aiken in 2019
- Born: Alastair James Aiken; 6 November 1993 (age 32); Woking, Surrey, England
- Other names: Ali-A; Matroix
- Occupation: YouTuber
- Spouse: Clare Siobhan Callery (m. 2021)
- Children: 3

YouTube information
- Channel: Ali-A
- Genres: Let's Play; Video game walkthrough; Vlog
- Subscribers: 19.7 million (main channel); 20.3 million (MoreAliA); 985 thousand (Clare & Ali); 434 thousand (Ali-A Plays); 336 thousand(Ali-A²)
- Views: 7.2 billion (main channel); 7.2 billion (MoreAliA); 69.2 million (Clare & Ali); 26.9 million (Ali-A Plays); 99.6 million (Ali-A²)
- Last updated: February 15, 2026

Alastair James Aiken (born 6 November 1993), better known by his online alias Ali-A (or by his original alias Matroix), is a British YouTuber known for Call of Duty and Fortnite commentaries and vlogs. His main channel has a subscriber count of approximately 19.7 million.

== Career ==
Aiken vlogs about his day-to-day life and travels. When new installments to the Call of Duty video game franchise are announced, Aiken covers known information about the games, giving viewers in-depth reviews. Once the games are released, he creates video game walkthrough series on the games, demonstrating to viewers how to complete the new Call of Duty game.

== Public image and influence ==
=== Relationship with YouTube networks ===
Aiken signed with the YouTube multi-channel network (MCN), Polaris, in October 2013. Currently he is signed on with the MCN StyleHaul on both his Ali-A and More Ali-A channels. Other notable YouTubers within the network include both of Daniel Middleton's YouTube channels and KSI. According to Socialblade's statistics, both of Aiken's YouTube channels are within the top 50 in the network.

=== Supporting programs ===
Aiken co-hosted NCS Yes Live 2016 on 29 March in the London Roundhouse. The event celebrates the "impact young people's social change projects have had on local communities."

== Awards and nominations ==
Year	Award	Category	Result	Ref.
2015	Guinness World Records	Most popular Call of Duty Channel by views	Won	
2015	Guinness World Records	Most popular Call of Duty Channel by subscribers	Won	
2015	Guinness World Records	The tallest staircase built in one minute in Minecraft	Won	
2015	Guinness World Records	Most blocks of wood collected in three minutes in Minecraft	Won	
2016	Guinness World Records	Highest score in offline Team Deathmatch using only the knife and combat axe on Call of Duty: Black Ops III (team of two)	Won	(Note: Shared with Tom Cassell)
2019	Forbes 30 Under 30	Games	Included	

== Publications ==
- Ali-A; Scott, Cavan; Sotirovski, Aleksandar (24 October 2017). Ali-A Adventures: Game On!. Random House Books for Young Readers. ISBN 978-1524770952.
