= Yapıcıoğlu =

Yapıcıoğlu (Turkish: "son of the maker, builder") is a surname. Notable people with the surname include:

- Mennan Yapıcıoğlu (born 1966), German director, screenwriter, producer and actor
- Yavuz Yapıcıoğlu (born 1967), Turkish serial killer and arsonist
- Zekeriya Yapıcıoğlu (born 1966), Kurdish politician and lawyer
