= Game replay =

Type of video game replay

A demonstration of a video game replay in the game Ultimate Stunts

A game replay, also known as a demo, is a form of user-generated content. In most instances, a game replay is a recording of a battle or race between opponents in a video game which can then be viewed by other players. However, game replays are also used for single-player gameplay, especially for speedruns. Some games, such as TrackMania, Doom, and N, use size-efficient replay files that record inputs to get a 1:1 replay in lossless fidelity.

It is most common in real-time strategy games like StarCraft, Command & Conquer, World in Conflict, Company of Heroes, and Age of Empires, as well as some first-person shooter games such as Counter-Strike (via console command). Recently, game replays are being used on non-computer platforms and games, such as Halo Wars.

A number of websites allow users to upload replays of certain games so that other players can download and watch them, either for entertainment or improving their own skills.

== Uses ==
Game replays are commonly used in the prevention and detection of cheating, especially when used in electronic sports. Game replays are often watched to develop skill at a game, by watching better players and their techniques and build orders. Replays are also used to raise stature in a particular game's community, and entire websites are dedicated to the replays.

=== Replay review ===
Game replays are the driving force behind replay reviews. A replay review can be loosely defined as a review of a game replay by an experienced player to determine what can be done to improve and expand upon the initial gamer's skill. Entire websites are dedicated to these reviews, such as Gamereplays.org.

== Methods of recording ==
Replays are normally saved in proprietary formats made by the developers—this can either be in form of video capture or input capture, with the latter being much more efficient in terms of file size. Replays recorded using third-party tools, such as FRAPS, are a form of user-generated content. They capture the on-screen action and compile it into a video format. These replays have the advantage of supporting online playback via video sharing sites, like YouTube or Veoh, but take much more hard disk space than conventional replays.

Other utilities, such as Wegame, interact directly with the game and do not record directly from the screen.

== See also ==
- Let's Play
- Video game walkthrough
