= Policenauts =

1994 visual novel directed by Hideo Kojima

- Developer: Konami
- Publisher: Konami
- Director: Hideo Kojima
- Producer: Akihiko Nagata
- Designer: Hideo Kojima
- Artists: Tomiharu Kinoshita; Hajime Katoki; Yoji Shinkawa; Hitoshi Nagao
- Writer: Hideo Kojima
- Composers: Tappi Iwase; Masahiro Ikariko; Motoaki Furukawa
- Platforms: PC-9821, 3DO, PlayStation, Sega Saturn
- Release: NEC PC-9821; JP: July 29, 1994; 3DO; JP: September 29, 1995; PlayStation; JP: January 19, 1996; Sega Saturn; JP: September 13, 1996
- Genres: Adventure, visual novel, interactive movie
- Mode: Single-player

Policenauts (Note: Japanese: ポリスノーツ, Hepburn: Porisunōtsu) is a graphic adventure game developed and published by Konami. It was written and directed by Hideo Kojima, and originally released for the PC-9821 in 1994. A hard science fiction story, Policenauts is set in the mid 21st century and follows Jonathan Ingram, an astronaut recently recovered floating in space in cryosleep after an accident at the space colony Beyond Coast sent him drifting into space for 24 years. Now a detective in Los Angeles, Ingram travels back to Beyond Coast to investigate the murder of his ex-wife and her husband's disappearance. As he begins his investigation, he starts to uncover an illegal organ trafficking ring.

Kojima conceived Policenauts while working on Snatcher (1988), and began development in 1990. He wanted the production quality to match that of major motion pictures, and created a scripting engine to give him more creative control. Drawing creative influences from American buddy television shows, contemporary social debates on anti-Japanese sentiment and organ transplantation, and Japan's heightened interest in space travel following the first Japanese man's trip to space in 1990, he sought to explore the concept of how living in space may affect human society and life, socially and physiologically. The original PC-9821 release used pixel art, while the 3DO, PlayStation, and Sega Saturn ports featured cel animation by Anime International Company.

An English localization was planned for the Saturn but was eventually cancelled, with Kojima citing technical problems with the translation. After interest in Kojima's work grew following the release of Metal Gear Solid (1998), fan translations of the PlayStation and Sega Saturn versions were released in 2009 and 2016 respectively. Critics have praised Policenauts for its animation, voice acting, and overall presentation; several commentators have analysed its cinematic influences from films in the science fiction, action, comedy, and buddy-cop genres, while others noted its reflection of Kojima's fascination with science and technology, and have praised its storyline, technical writing and worldbuilding.

== Gameplay ==
The player chooses actions from text-based menus to progress the story. In this scene (from the PC-98 version), Jonathan is conversing with Lorraine Hojo.

Policenauts is a graphic adventure game with a point-and-click interface. It has also been called a visual novel and an interactive movie. The player moves a cursor freely across the screen to click on objects to examine them. During conversations, the player is given dialogue options to choose from. Once the right object in the scene has been examined or the dialogue options have been exhausted, the game progresses to the next scene in the story. In versions with cel animation, these scenes the player must examine are stills from the animated cinematics, so the game moves seamlessly between them and cutscenes. There are occasional action scenes where the player must fire a gun at enemies in a first-person perspective. The Sega Saturn version supports a light gun for these segments.

== Plot ==
In 2013, Los Angeles Police Department officer Jonathan Ingram (Hideyuki Tanaka) was one of five "Policenauts", police officers who received astronaut training to protect Beyond Coast, humanity's first functional self-supporting space colony. During the test of a new space suit, an accident causes Jonathan to drift into space, presumed dead by his colleagues. In reality, the cryogenic survival system in the suit preserved him, and he is found and revived 25 years later. During that time, Beyond Coast has become the principal development location for potential interstellar travel, and is protected by a dedicated police force dubbed the Beyond Coast Police Department (BCPD).

In 2040, Jonathan has become a private investigator on Earth in Old Los Angeles. He is visited by his former wife Lorraine (Chiyoko Kawashima), who remarried while he was presumed dead. Lorraine asks for Jonathan's help in solving the disappearance of her husband, Kenzo Hojo; the only clues are a torn leaf, a set of capsules, and the word "Plato". Jonathan is reluctant to take her case at first, but after Lorraine leaves his office, she is murdered by a man in a black motorcycle suit. After failing to catch the culprit, Jonathan decides to fulfill Lorraine's final request and travels to Beyond, where he is reunited with his former LAPD partner, BCPD Vice Department chief Ed Brown (Shōzō Iizuka), who agrees to help Jonathan investigate the circumstances surrounding Hojo's disappearance and Lorraine's murder along with Vice Unit members Meryl Silverburgh (Kyoko Terase) and Dave Forrest (Bin Shimada).

During their investigation, Jonathan receives information from Karen (Kikuko Inoue), Lorraine's daughter with Hojo, that Hojo was growing increasingly stressed working at Tokugawa Pharmaceuticals, which is helping research medical solutions to health problems caused by living in space. Jonathan and Ed also run into former Policenauts Gates Becker (Osamu Saka) and Joseph Tokugawa (Iemasa Kayumi), the latter of whom Jonathan suspects of being involved. They receive further leads from a former co-worker of Hojo's; the informant is later killed and used to lure Jonathan and Ed into an unsuccessful booby trap. Hojo's body is eventually found, and Jonathan is framed for the killings. Tokugawa and Becker are revealed to have both been responsible for Jonathan's accident, and the prime movers behind an illegal drug and organ trafficking ring designed to counteract the negative side-effects of being in space for long periods of time.

Hojo became involved in the conspiracy to save Karen from her terminal bone cancer, but eventually tried to break away and was murdered. With help from Ed and Meryl, Jonathan storms the Tokugawa headquarters, killing Lorraine's assassin and then confronts Becker. When apparently cornered, Jonathan tricks Becker into revealing the whole scheme through a live video feed, exposing the scandal to Beyond Coast. Ed saves Jonathan by killing Becker, while Meryl and the remaining police arrest Tokugawa. Jonathan donates his bone marrow to Karen upon learning that he is her biological father, and returns to Earth.

== Development ==
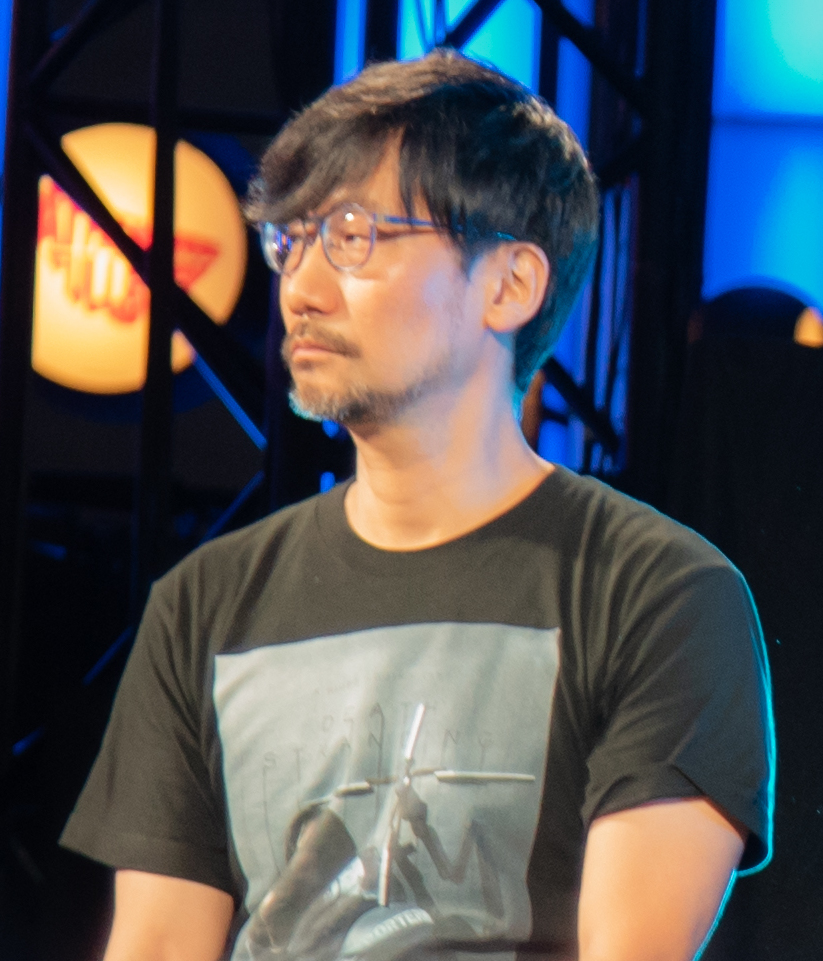
Director Hideo Kojima in 2018

Policenauts was developed by Konami and directed by Hideo Kojima. Kojima began to explore concepts for Policenauts during the development of Snatcher (1988) when memory limitation issues prompted them to take a break. He wanted the game to remain in the adventure genre, feeling it was the best method to express what he wanted with video games. He was also growing frustrated with game development and wanted more creative control. After the release of Metal Gear 2: Solid Snake (1990), he developed a scripting engine so he could maintain control over when animations and music played instead of the programmers. Kojima wrote and implemented the text-based based portion of Policenauts himself in 1990, which is when development began in earnest, but was not given resources to proceed, keeping it alive as a technical project for its game engine. This changed from 1992 onwards when a boom of adult-oriented PC adventure games such as Dōkyūsei demonstrated there was a market for Policenauts. The game's development lasted for four years in total.

Kojima wanted to explore a near future scenario that could realistically occur rather than outlandish science fiction. The game's story was influenced by news that captured his interest at the time. One such influence was the public debate over organ transplantation and brain death injuries. Another influence was the rise in anti-Japanese sentiment caused by the American crime film Rising Sun (1993). Some Asian-Americans held protests, fearing the negative characterization of Japanese in the film would lead to hate crimes. Space travel was also an influence after Toyohiro Akiyama became the first Japanese person to travel to space in 1990. Concurrently, many NASA documents about space travel and its effects on the human body were being published in Japan for the first time and were hot topics among Kojima's friends and family. Kojima was curious as to what effect living in space would have on the human body, relationships, and wondered what facets of humans would be exposed in space. He chose to explore these concepts in Policenauts. Kojima mixed his space interests with the aforementioned social issues to build the thematic basis of Policenauts and hoped the players would ponder these topics.

Earth was called "Home" in the game while the space colony was named "Beyond", names chosen to reflect a parent-child relationship. "Beyond" also references the colony's distance from Home and the 25 years protagonist Jonathan Ingram passed through during his cryosleep. Kojima hoped that these names would reflect the persistence of human society and relationships, even after extreme technological advances. The colony's cylindrical shape was inspired by Gundam. Policenauts was originally titled Beyond, but Konami changed the name after they were unable to trademark it.

Kojima's familiarity with film and television influenced the cinematography in Policenauts. Though not attempting to use video games as a vehicle for presenting movies, he wanted to fill what he perceived to be a lack of production quality in games. Kojima worked to take the excellence of acting, lighting, direction, and storytelling in filmmaking and match that quality in his games. He took inspiration from American buddy television shows he enjoyed growing up like Starsky & Hutch. The game was originally going to be marketed as a "Cinematic Virtual Reality". Konami did a trademark search early in development that turned up empty, but by 1994, the "Virtual Reality" term had been trademarked so it was dropped.

== Release ==
The PC-98 version (top) features animated pixel art, while the console versions (bottom) use cel animation.

Policenauts was first released for the PC-9821 on July 29, 1994. Kojima received a letter from a hearing-impaired player after release, upset that modern games like Policenauts with its CD-ROM technology were replacing game text with actual speech. Kojima originally omitted subtitles to evoke a cinematic feel, but he added them for following versions to satisfy the players. The first port was for the 3DO Interactive Multiplayer and released on September 29, 1995. A short demo with a game glossary, artwork, and design documents was released on April 21, 1995, called the Pilot Disk. The 3DO version and subsequent console ports had a drop in display resolution, and used newly animated full motion video in contrast to the animated stills used in the PC version. The visuals were animated by Anime International Company using traditional cel animation techniques.

The next port was for the PlayStation, released on January 19, 1996. A bonus disc called Policenauts Private Collection was released concurrently which has most of the same content as the 3DO's Pilot Disk bonuses plus storyboards and the game script, as well as select shooting segments from the main game. The full motion videos in this version run slower at 15 frames per second (FPS) compared to 24 on the 3DO. Some story details that suggested subplots were also removed. The PlayStation launched while Konami was still developing Policenauts for the PC-9821. Seeing the system's potential, Kojima promised himself he would make a Metal Gear game for the system, though first he ported Policenauts. In contrast to computer games, Sony and other console manufacturers ran quality testing on games for their consoles to check for bugs and rate game content. When Policenauts was being evaluated, Shuhei Yoshida of Sony Computer Entertainment told Kojima they were discussing the extent of breast jiggling in the game. This version was re-issued on August 7, 2003, through Konami's online store, and it was re-released digitally on PlayStation Store on May 14, 2008.

The final port was for the Sega Saturn, released on September 13, 1996. The version comes packaged in a slipcase containing the game case itself and a hardbound art book. It also includes some additional scenes and some modified story details, including the readdition of removed details in the PlayStation version. Kojima insisted that the Saturn port have increased video fidelity, retaining the 3DO's original 24 FPS and not using Cinepak encoding. The port also includes light gun support, a concept Kojima had since the inception of a Saturn port. His hope was that players would feel more emotion using the gun in Policenauts than in games like Lethal Enforcers (1992) which he felt did not evoke empathy. The Saturn version also has some of the content featured in the Pilot Disk and Private Collection bonus discs released on previous consoles, such as some of the making-of videos and an interview with voice actress Kikuko Inoue (unlocked after completing the game once), as well as the glossary, which is now accessible during play, allowing players to look up keywords whenever they are first used in the story.

=== Localization ===
An official English translation of Policenauts was announced for release on the Sega Saturn in 1996 in North America. It appeared in catalogs with promotional box artwork, but the game never materialized. Kojima discussed making an English translation three times, but encountered translation difficulties. As he explained, the Japanese dialogue was parsed into phrases with flags the program could reference, and making English dialogue work with this system would be too difficult. According to Jeremy Blaustein, who worked in Konami's international business department and led the translations of Snatcher and Metal Gear Solid (1998), there were never plans to localize Policenauts. He personally felt it was one of Kojima's weaker games, not enjoying the "space cowboy" theme and feeling it lacked the tension and humor of Snatcher. Industry journalists have speculated in hindsight that Konami may have passed on localization because of Snatcher's commercial failure and Policenauts' long scenes and protracted dialogue during an era of heightened consumer interest in 3D action games.

After the successful release of Metal Gear Solid, fan interest grew in Snatcher and Policenauts. Around 2000, a petition on the Konami of America online message boards prompted the subsidiary to discuss localizing Policenauts with Konami of Japan. Their attempts were unsuccessful because Kojima did not want to work on older games. In response to the PS One re-release in 2003, fans organized an email campaign to pressure Konami to localize the game once again. Their attempt was publicized and supported by IGN.

Work on an English fan translation began in 2002. In February 2007, the team announced it was nearing completion with a planned release in the second half of the year. Other help was provided by YouTuber Slowbeef. The translation was finally released two years later in August 2009 as a patch for the PlayStation version. It can be played on an emulator, or a PlayStation modified to read CD-Rs by ripping the game files from retail discs, applying the English patch, and burning the patched game to CD-Rs. Because some fans consider the Sega Saturn version a superior port, fans released a translation patch for it in 2016.

== Reception ==
Reception

Review scores
Publication	Score
Famitsu	8/10, 8/10, 7/10, 7/10 (PS); 8/10, 8/10, 8/10, 8/10 (SS)
GameFan	94%, 92%, 100% (PS)
Dengeki PlayStation	85/100, 85/100, 70/100, 80/100 (PS)
Sega Saturn Magazine (JP)	8.33/10 (SS)

In Japan, critics praised Policenauts for its high level of presentation. Both Sega Saturn Magazine and Famitsu praised the quality of animation, voice acting, and its engrossing setting. Sega Saturn Magazine felt it was more like a movie than a game and praised its unique blend of genres, but found some of the text difficult to understand and warned that its heavy scientific writing may not be suitable for everyone. Famitsu described the narrative as "hardboiled". Both publications recommended Policenauts to fans of adventure games and anime.

The game was also reviewed in contemporary Western publications despite its lack of localization. Computer and Video Games previewed the 3DO version and considered it a sequel to Snatcher. They felt the game had an interesting plot, "bizarre and inventive" characters, and appreciated the "level of senseless violence and gratuitous rudity of graphics." GameFan reviewed the PlayStation and Saturn ports; they felt it pushed the genre of interactive movies better than previous games in the genre and praised the game's intricate technical details, although they cautioned that its specificity may put off some players. They also praised its suspenseful storytelling, and felt it was worth players' time even though it emphasized text over action. They concluded that Policenauts was "a masterful achievement, a near-future scenario so intricately detailed, well thought out and full of originality it puts Hollywood's best attempts at sci-fi to shame." Konami was busy releasing many sports games at the time, so GameFan feared it would not be localized.

=== Retrospective ===
Policenauts has continued to receive praise for its writing and presentation in retrospective reviews. Critics highlighted Kojima's cinematic influences from science fiction films, buddy cop films, and other Eastern and Western films: in particular, the character designs drew comparisons to Lethal Weapon (1987). Mark Ryan Sallee of IGN called the game a manifestation of Kojima's film obsessions, and accomplished in its "unique direction and striking moods" thanks to the strength of its animation and vocal performances. Comparing the game's production values to anime of the mid-1990s, Bob Mackey of 1Up.com liked how the game transitioned seamlessly between cutscene and gameplay, and preferred this style of presentation to games with high-quality cinematics that do not complement the gameplay. N. Ho Sang and Peter Tieryas of Kotaku wrote that "Its flashes of Lethal Weapon-esque intrigue give way to the deep metaphysical meanderings that makes for the usual Kojima mind meld on top of fantastic production values and mesmerizing art."

Kojima's fascination with space and future technology was noted in several reviews, and the elaborate detail placed into describing hypothetical technologies and commonplace items was frequently singled out for praise. Critics also felt the game's scientific terminology and dark themes were well-translated by fans into English. Regarding the game's story, Sallee wrote that the "somber dialogue" progressed it in a unique way. Kurt Kalata of Hardcore Gaming 101 criticized the story as predictable, and described it as "empty, merely a buddy cop film with some sci-fi elements". Parkin found that despite ostensibly being a detective story, the game's narrative was thematically concerned with middle age, and was fascinated by the game's focus on middle-aged characters as opposed to adolescents in most other games. Sam Bishop of IGN also praised the game's strong characterization.

The game did receive some criticism. Some felt its moments of sexual humor – notably the option for Jonathan to grope the breasts of many of the game's female characters ― conflicted with its otherwise serious tone; Mackey explained that this was a remnant of the game's original release on Japanese computers during a time when the market was flooded with hentai games. Concerning criticisms of its slow pace, Mackey wrote that the game requires patience, while Kalata criticized the lack of a dialogue skip option. Parkin wrote that its format is outdated and not for everyone, but still called it "a triumph of gentle interactive storytelling", and felt it could be enjoyed by those with interests in "thrillers, point and click adventures, science fiction homage and Japanese esoterica".

== Legacy ==
Policenauts was not well known in the West until the fan translation was released in 2009. Critics have expressed interest in a re-release or sequel. Sam Bishop of IGN included it among a list of games he wanted to see receive a high-definition remaster. N. Ho Sang and Peter Tieryas of Kotaku included it on a list of desired sequels, and expressed interest in a proper English port of the original. Writing in 2013, Jon Leo of GameSpot wrote that he wanted to see the game re-released for the PlayStation 4, feeling it could be a good mainstream push for visual novels and adventure games. While still working with Konami in 2012, Kojima expressed interest in exploring a follow-up to Policenauts, but felt it was difficult to carry out from a business perspective. In 2023, he shared one concept for a sequel which featured Tony Redwood returning to Home to seek vengeance. Bob Mackey of 1UP.com criticized Konami for failing to acknowledge or pursue localization of Policenauts and other non-Metal Gear games by Kojima.

In retrospect, the game is often called a spiritual successor to Snatcher. Sang and Tieryas wrote that "Snatcher was a masterpiece. Policenauts took it a step further." IGN called them "arguably two of the biggest cyberpunk/sci-fi games to ever grace consoles", and Eurogamer described Policenauts' sci-fi elements as "some of the medium's strongest." Both games are credited for establishing Kojima's style that propelled him to excellence with his later games. Some of the Policenauts staff went on to hold lead development roles on Kojima's later efforts, including the Zone of the Enders and Metal Gear series. The character Meryl Silverburgh and the Tokugawa Corporation in Policenauts were repurposed for the Metal Gear series.
