= How to Master the Video Games =

1981 arcade guide book

- Author: Tom Hirschfeld
- Language: English
- Subject: Arcade games
- Genre: Guidebook
- Publisher: Bantam Books
- Publication date: 1981
- Media type: Print (paperback)

How to Master the Video Games is a paperback book written by Tom Hirschfeld and published by Bantam Books in 1981. It is a guidebook exploring 30 of the most popular arcade games of its time. Grame Mason writing for Eurogamer described it as "one of the first tips books" while Scott Stilphen identified it as one of "the first 2 'how to' video game books" alongside Ken Uston's Mastering Pac-Man which came out the same year.

Hirschfeld divides the included games into broad categories in the table of contents: Space Invaders-type, Asteroids-type, maze, reflex, and miscellaneous. Space Invaders-type corresponds to the modern genre of fixed shooter, while Asteroids-type is now called multidirectional shooter.

The book was followed by How to Master Home Video Games in 1982 by the same author. In 1982 Michael Blanchet released two competing books, How to Beat the Video Games and How to Beat Atari, Intellivision, and Other Home Video Games.

== Reception ==
How to Master the Video Games sold about 650,000 copies, appearing on The New York Times mass-market paperback list.

Stanley Greenlaw reviewed the book for Computer Gaming World, and stated that "The book is just the ticket for the game player who wants to be more than a novice. If you really want to enjoy the coin-operated arcades take a few of those spare quarters and pick up How to Master the Video Games, you'll come out ahead in the long run."
