= Ayhan Kartal =

Turkish murderer

- Born: Ayhan Körniş; 1966; İzmir, Turkey
- Died: March 13, 2000 (aged 34); Mansia Psychiatric Hospital, Manisa
- Cause of death: Homicide (stab wounds)
- Other name: "The Beast of İzmir"
- Status: Deceased
- Criminal charges: Rape and murder
- Penalty: Involuntary commitment

Details
- Victims: 2
- Span of crimes: April 20, 1985 – September 23, 1989
- Country: Turkey
- Location: İzmir

Ayhan Kartal (né Korniş; 1966 – March 13, 2000) was a Turkish rapist and child killer. He was stabbed to death by his roommates in a mental hospital.

== Crimes ==
On April 20, 1985, Ayhan Korniş killed the 13-year-old Armağan Kayadipli by strangling him after he raped him in the İkiçeşmelik quarter of Kemeraltı district in İzmir. He was placed in a mental hospital in Bakırköy, Istanbul, and was released following about one-year long psychiatric treatment. He changed his surname from Korniş to Kartal.

On September 23, 1989, Kartal raped and killed the 9-year-old boy Barış Kurt in Şirinyer, İzmir. He was apprehended while he was hiding in a chest at his home at Pınarbaşı, Bornova in İzmir.

In 1992, Kartal was transferred to Manisa Psychiatric Hospital for the diagnosis and treatment of his mental disorder. He escaped from the hospital on October 14, 1993, but was apprehended after a while in İzmir, and brought back to the hospital. He confessed to the authorities that "he feels himself close to children, and he can have intercourse with children only". He was nicknamed "The Beast of İzmir" (Turkish: İzmir Canavarı).

== Death ==
In the mental hospital, Kartal was afraid of the serial killer Süleyman Aktaş, nicknamed "The Nailing Killer" (Turkish: Çivici katil), with whom he shared the same ward. After a while, he was relocated to another ward following his request. In the night of March 13, 2000, Kartal was stabbed once in the throat and three times in the stomach by his two roommates, the serial killer Ali Kaya (23), nicknamed "The Babyface Killer", and Tayfun Şahin (32), in the 17-people hospital ward. The physician on duty found him with wounds in blood, and arranged his transfer to an emergency station after persuading and passivating the two offenders. Kartal died underway.
