= Süleyman Aktaş =

Turkish serial killer

- Born: Çambaşı, Bozkurt, Denizli, Turkey
- Other name: The Nailing Killer

Details
- Victims: 5
- Span of crimes: 1986–1994

Süleyman Aktaş is a Turkish serial killer who murdered five people. He has been nicknamed "The Nailing Killer" due to his signature of nailing his victims' heads post-mortem.

== Background and first murder ==
Süleyman Aktaş was born in Çambaşı. He was employed as a worker at the Turkish Electricity Company in Denizli, Turkey. He was severely injured by high voltage during work at a 31.5 kV electric power distribution line.

After this accident, he killed police superintendent Nuri Keskin in Antalya in 1986. He was arrested, and was placed in Manisa Psychiatric Hospital after the court ruled his mental disorder. Aktaş stayed four and a half years in the hospital before his release. He returned to his hometown of Çambaşı village in Bozkurt, Denizli.

== Later murders, institutionalization, escape, and incarceration ==
In 1994, Süleyman Aktaş strangled four elderly neighbours three years after he came back to his hometown. He nailed the couples Ayşe (65) and İsmail Güneş (66), and Rukiye (77) and Ramazan Kocatepe (78) in the eyes and heads. In his testimony after his arrest, he stated that "He can not stand nails. He wants to nail people in the head." Aktaş was nicknamed "The Nailing Killer". He was hospitalized as diagnosed with paranoid schizophrenia. He escaped from the hospital but was apprehended in the coach terminal.

In 2007, Aktaş was seen publicly for the first time after twelve years in a rehabilitation show program of the hospital. At noon of 28 May 2008, he assaulted his roommate, the child killer Ömer Yılmaz, and wounded him by hitting him in the head with a rock in the exercise yard of the hospital, where he had been kept in a special department for 13 years. Yılmaz underwent head surgery in a nearby state hospital, and survived the attack. Aktaş also shared the same ward as Ayhan Kartal, the latter of whom feared him before his death in 2000.

== See also ==
- List of serial killers by country
