= Richard Kyanka =

American internet personality (1976–2021)

- Born: Richard Charles Kyanka; May 11, 1976
- Died: November 9, 2021 (aged 45); Lee's Summit, Missouri, US
- Other name: Lowtax
- Occupations: Internet personality; media commentator; YouTuber
- Known for: Creator of Something Awful
- Spouses: Megan Austin (m. 2005; div. 2014); Ashli Kathleen (m. 2015)

Richard Charles Kyanka (May 11, 1976 – November 9, 2021), known by his username Lowtax (a reference to Byron (Low Tax) Looper), was an American internet personality who created the website Something Awful in 1999. He dropped out of college his junior year and was hired by GameSpy to run PlanetQuake, a news site for the Quake video game series.

== Other endeavors ==
In 2001, Kyanka was entered into the Entertainment Weekly (EW) Entertainer of the Year online poll, and went on to receive "thousands of votes", but was disqualified because EW judged they were the result of an email campaign.

In 2006, Kyanka accepted Uwe Boll's challenge to a boxing match, which Boll had issued to all his online critics. The match took place on September 23 in Vancouver; Boll knocked Kyanka out in less than two minutes.

On October 9, 2020, following a backlash from the community in response to allegations that Kyanka was a domestic abuser, Kyanka sold Something Awful to a fifteen-year member and moderator known as Jeffrey of YOSPOS. Kyanka was subsequently banned from the site.

== Death ==
Kyanka died by suicide on November 9, 2021.
