= Universal Hint System =

The Universal Hint System, better known by the acronym UHS, is a form of strategy guide used for video games, created by Jason Strautmann in 1988. The system is designed to provide hints for solving specific parts of games without including premature spoilers. The strategy guides are primarily distributed in a UHS file format, readable using a UHS reader program.

== Readers ==
Since the system's creation, UHS readers have been made available MS-DOS, Macintosh, Windows and other platforms. The current versions of the official readers are proprietary software products. An official Internet website, UHSWeb went online in 1998, allowing access to UHS guides via web browsers, including text-based web browsers such as Lynx.

In 2006, a platform-independent open source reader written in Java, OpenUHS, began development. As of 2008, it fully supports all hint formats.

== Reception ==
Chuck Miller of Computer Gaming World in 1993 called UHS "a nifty gaming utility that I wish would receive greater, perhaps even universal, support in the gaming community", stating "I heartily recommend the Universal Hint System as an adventurer's resource par excellence".

== Current status ==
The latest additions to UHS database are hints from year 2015 about Blackwell (series). In March 2021 Meghann O'Neill wrote a Gamasutra article about low-spoiler hints for adventure games. In the article, she briefly mentions UHS and states that it is not active anymore.
