= Yavuz Yapıcıoğlu =

Turkish serial killer and arsonist (born 1967)

- Born: 1967 (age 58–59); Adana, Turkey
- Other names: The Screwdriver Killer; The Beast
- Known for: Arsonist, serial killer
- Penalty: 40 years in prison

Details
- Victims: 18–40
- Span of crimes: 1994–2002
- Weapon: Screwdriver
- Date apprehended: 2002

Yavuz Yapıcıoğlu (born 1967) is a Turkish serial killer and arsonist nicknamed "The Screwdriver Killer". He is considered the most prolific serial killer in Turkish history, being responsible for the deaths of 18 people between 1994 and 2002 according to police records, or as many as 40 according to eyewitnesses and his relatives.

== Early life ==
Yavuz Yapıcıoğlu was born in Adana in 1967. He has nine siblings. He claimed his family was unloving. His father married a woman with whom he had an affair, and he was raised by his stepmother. He finished primary and middle school at the top of the class. He was well-liked by his classmates. He left home and dropped out of high school in the tenth grade after a quarrel with his parents.

He married, but the marriage lasted only a brief time. He played football on his school's team and later for an amateur league club. He started a business in the leather trade but was unsuccessful. Sometime before 1994, he joined a religious cult in Merter, Istanbul. Since he had no income, he lived with his brother.

== Crimes ==
Yapıcıoğlu committed his crimes apparently with little cause. In 1994, he stabbed three people to death after one of them wished him good morning. The 20-year-old Sait Korkmaz died at the scene. Yapıcıoğlu then tried to escape, hijacking a car and killing the driver, Rasim Aydın. Yapıcıoğlu was apprehended in Avcılar. He was placed in Bakırköy Psychiatric Hospital, where he assaulted his roommates and the nurses, and set his ward on fire. He was released due a medical report attesting diminished responsibility.

Later he interfered in a dispute between a girl and a servant in Istanbul, running after the girl and stabbing the servant to death when the servant tried to interfere. After the killing, he fled to Adana, where he killed three more people without any known cause. He boarded a coach in Adana, and during a stopover in Ankara, he murdered another man. Yapıcıoğlu then ran after an eyewitness, caught him and killed him by cutting his throat.

From Ankara, Yapıcıoğlu went to Çorlu, where his brother owned a shop. He set his brother's shop on fire because he did not give him pocket money. He also set the houses of two other relatives on fire. He raided his father's home in Silivri with intent to kill him, but his father defended himself with a pump-action shotgun. He fled from there to Edremit, where his maternal grandmother lived. Three days later, Yapıcıoğlu killed her by hitting her head with a crystal ashtray, because she had told him something about his mother (her daughter) that he did not like. His mother died of a heart attack two days later, upon learning about this incident.

After another arrest, Bakırköy Psychiatric Hospital again found him to have diminished responsibility. He stayed in a mental hospital for treatment lasting about one year. Following his release, he continued with his murders. He killed three people and injured two more severely with a screwdriver in Çorlu. Late at night, he went first to the Çorluspor facility and murdered nightman Hüseyin Yumruk with a screwdriver. Then, he skewered Özcan Karagözoğlu in an industrial zone. Finally, he killed Şakir Temüriçi, whom he met on the street. He threw the bodies in a hole. In the early morning hours, he went to Tonguçlar Mosque, wounded the imam, Salih Baş, in his neck with a screwdriver, and escaped.

He was apprehended on 24 December 2002, and the court ordered his mental examination by the legal medicine institute, which certified in April 2003 that Yapıcıoğlu was fully criminally liable for offences he committed. The report stated further that he simulated mental disorder. He was detained in the Tekirdağ Prison.

During his trial in Tekirdağ on 25 December 2002, he admitted that he can normally speak well and do good, but he sometimes experiences loss of feeling time and place. He added that his killings took place during such episodes.

Immediately after his arrest, his brother Yıldır Yapıcıoğlu stated in an interview with a newspaper that Yavuz Yapıcıoğlu is responsible also for the unsolved so-called Avcılar murders. He added that his brother had assaulted and raped women because he hated women due to his unsuccessful marriage. According to Yıldır Yapıcıoğlu, Yavuz confessed to other killings to him. He said he knew of three more unsolved murders in Istanbul, three in Adana, and two in Ankara, as well as the killing of a soldier. According to his brother, Yavuz Yapıcıoğlu, who was nicknamed "The Screwdriver Killer", has killed more than 40 people, of whom only 18 were identified. He is believed to be the serial killer with the highest known victim count in Turkey.

== See also ==
- List of serial killers by country
- List of serial killers by number of victims
