= Ali Kaya (serial killer) =

Turkish serial killer

- Born: 1978 (age 47–48); Gaziantep, Turkey
- Other name: The Babyface Killer
- Penalty: Psychiatric imprisonment 5 years in prison

Details
- Victims: 10
- Span of crimes: 1997–
- Country: Turkey

Ali Kaya (born 1978) is a Turkish serial killer. Nicknamed "The Babyface Killer", Kaya is responsible for ten murders.

== Killings ==
Ali Kaya committed crimes such as theft, assault and snatch theft, and was imprisoned at the age of 17. He was released from prison in 1997 when he was 19 years old. The same year, he began his murders.

He stabbed his uncle Celal Kaya to death while working at his real estate office in Alanya in 1997. Kaya was sentenced to five-year aggravated imprisonment in Silifke Prison for this crime. In 1999, he was released on parole.

He then killed Zeynel Abidin Gümüş, who he believed had sexually assaulted his mother. During his incarceration at Elazığ Prison, he was diagnosed with a "mental disorder". Kaya was transferred to a psychiatric hospital, from where he was released due to a report attesting him as having claustrophobia.

With his freedom, he stabbed three people in Alanya, a music hall owner called "Dedo", a procurer called "Mehmet of Ağrı" and Fırat S., of whom two died later. Since he had a psychiatric report, he was not detained during his trial.

Kaya killed two wardens of Alanya prison, Kemal Aksakal and Hasan Askeroğlu, by stabbing them in the street. He was placed in Manisa Psychiatric Hospital with the diagnosis of a personality disorder.

On the night of 13 March 2000, he murdered his roommate, the rapist and child killer Ayhan Kartal, nicknamed "The Beast of Izmir" (Turkish: İzmir canavarı), he and Tayfun Şahin stabbed Kartal in the throat and the stomach.

Following this crime, Kaya was nicknamed "The Babyface Killer" (Turkish: Bebek yüzlü katil). In 2001, he was arrested and placed in Şanlıurfa Prison.

Briefly after his release, he killed Mehmet Poyraz, who lived in his parental home in Gaziantep. Kaya was again captured in November 2013 by the Turkish Gendarmerie forces after a fierce shootout.

== 2003 escape ==
Ali Kaya escaped from the semi-open prison in Şanlıurfa in 2003. He was apprehended in 2004 when a suspicious vehicle was stopped in the village of Mahmutlar, Alanya. He possessed a fake ID card under the name Erdal Yılmaz. A long "death list" was found on him, which included the names of notable businessmen and people he claims abused him during his childhood. Kaya stated in his interrogation that "he would confront his enemies and the sinners. He was not successful so far. However, he would cleanse the society of bad people".

== 2014 escape ==
On 5 January 2014, Ali Kaya managed to escape for a second time. During visitation hours at 10:30 local time on Sunday, he apparently walked out of Gaziantep Prison with the crowd of visitors. His absence was noticed only during the physical check of inmates in the evening.

Kaya is considered by the authorities to be extremely dangerous, and both police and gendarmerie forces launched an extensive manhunt for his capture. It was discovered that he went to Adana and Mersin, and had plans to cross the Syrian border. He was captured by security forces in downtown Gaziantep on 3 March 2014 as he fled from the house of a friend of his. He was found in possession of a handgun and a death list of ten persons when he was apprehended. Kaya was returned to the prison he had escaped from.

== See also ==
- List of serial killers by country
- List of serial killers by number of victims
