= Let's Play =

Playthrough of a video game with commentary

Let's Play video of the game 0 A.D.

A Let's Play (LP) is a video (or screenshots accompanied by text) documenting the playthrough of a video game, often including commentary and (in some cases) a camera view of the gamer's face. A Let's Play differs from a video game walkthrough or strategy guide by focusing on an individual's subjective experience with the game, often with humorous, irreverent, or critical commentary from the player, rather than being an objective source of information on how to progress through the game. While Let's Plays and live streaming of game playthroughs are related, Let's Plays tend to be curated experiences that include editing and narration, and can be scripted, while streaming is often an unedited experience performed on the fly.

== History ==
From the onset of computer video entertainment, video game players with access to screenshot capture software, video capture devices, and screen recording software have recorded themselves playing through games, often as part of walkthroughs, longplays, speedruns, or other digital entertainment formats. For example, within the French show Level One on the video game-centric Game One from 1998 to 2002, where host Marc Lacombe played through the early levels of games with commentary added by himself and sometimes a guest. Another example is the Japanese television program GameCenter CX, launched in 2003, where the host challenged to complete retro games within a single day, and others like Skip Rodgers had provided VHS tapes describing to players how to complete difficult games. One such form these took was the addition of running commentary, typically humorous in nature, along with the screenshots or videos; video-based playthroughs would typically be presented without significant editing to maintain the raw response the players had to the game. The presenter would also often poll readers or viewers with the in-game decisions as to provide an element of interactivity for the audience. Though others had used the same approach at the time, the forums at the website Something Awful are credited with coming up with the term "Let's Play" in 2007 to describe such playthroughs. The exact origins of the term are unclear, but believed to be about a screenshot playthrough of The Oregon Trail via the Something Awful forums sometime in 2005; the playthrough can no longer be found on the site, but has been referenced by other forum threads.

The format of Let's Plays is credited to Something Awful forum user Michael Sawyer under his username alias "Slowbeef". Sawyer stated that the format he adopted came from an earlier playthrough by forum user "Vlaphor" for I Have No Mouth, and I Must Scream. Sawyer's adaption would become the format that future Something Awful users would subsequently use. Sawyer is also credited for creating the first video playthrough for the game The Immortal which he made alongside his screenshot playthrough. From there, the format was popular with other forum users and many Let's Plays were created; the forum established a process to create these and the development of a large archive of Let's Plays. With the onset of user-created video streaming websites like YouTube and Twitch, more users have been able to prepare and share such videos, making the Let's Play format widely popular, spreading beyond the Something Awful forums.

== Contemporary ==
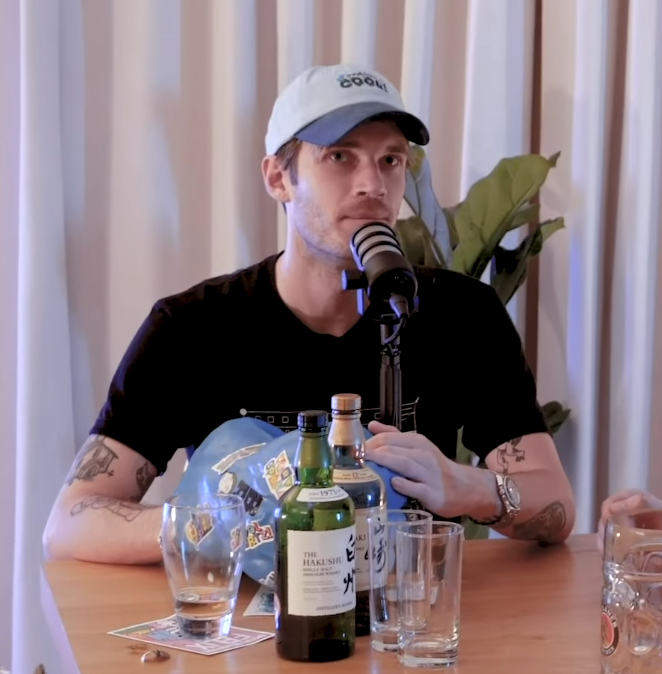
PewDiePie (Felix Kjellberg) has one of the largest subscriber bases for his Let's Play YouTube videos.

Let's Play videos are similar to a player completing a game via streaming video for an audience. According to Patrick Lee of The A.V. Club, a good Let's Play video distinguishes itself from straightforward streaming playthroughs when the player has sufficiently familiarized themselves with the game as to be able to offer better commentary and show off more of the game to their audience, is able to provide the audience with personal recollections about the game, or can play through a game they have already completed under self-imposed challenges, such as completing a game without killing any enemies. Through this approach, Lee states, such Let's Play videos serve to help memorialize these games, helping those who may not have access to the titles (due to age or regional restrictions) to appreciate more obscure games.

Some of the more popular gamers that create these videos have become Internet celebrities and seen as a type of "professional fan", according to Maker Studios' Dar Nothaft; other gamers tune into these videos to get a different perspective on games rather than professional review sources. Felix Kjellberg, known by his online pseudonym PewDiePie, has monetized his "Let's Play" videos which reach over 40 million subscribers and over 10 billion views, as of September 2015. PewDiePie's influence on game sales has been considerable, and games that are featured in Let's Plays on his channel frequently see large boosts in sales, creating what is called "the PewDiePie effect". Some other people or groups include Achievement Hunter, The Yogscast, Smosh Games, Chuggaaconroy, Jacksepticeye, Markiplier, DanTDM, Game Grumps, Stampylonghead, IHasCupquake, and Machinima.com.

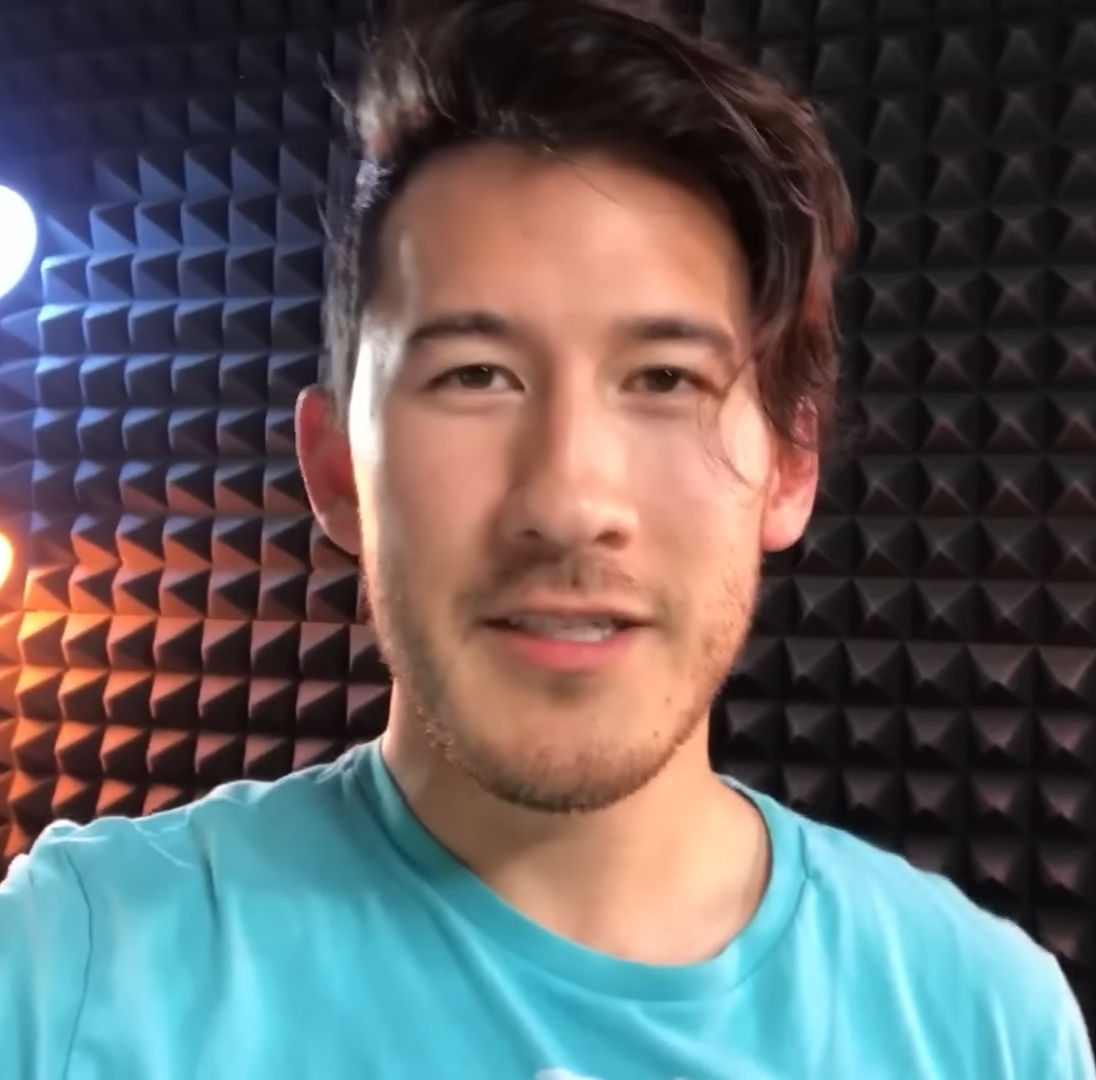
Markiplier has another of the largest subscriber bases for his Let's Play YouTube videos.

Such Let's Plays are monetized by ad revenue from the video hosting site. For example, standard Google affiliate programs pay approximately 55% of the price paid by advertisers to the content provider, while Google retains the rest; as such, revenue from Let's Play channel are based on the number of viewers they obtain. Providers can also join various content networks like Maker Studios, which offer promotion and advertising for content providers in exchange for a share of the ad revenue. PewDiePie's monthly revenue from his Let's Plays are estimated to be between $140,000 and $1.4 million, while smaller channels can still earn between $500 and $1000 a month; the Wall Street Journal reported that PewDiePie made over $4 million in 2013, while Forbes ranked him the highest earning YouTube personality in 2015, earning over $12 million a year before taxes. As of 2018, some of these top earners made between US$16 to 18 million a year.

Several of these individual Let's Players, as they are called, have transformed this into a full-time career while learning skills such as communications and video editing that can be used for future jobs. More popular broadcasters often share part of their revenue for charitable efforts, or hold charity drives while they play through games for a live audience. PewDiePie's contribution in this area led to him being listed as one of thirty most influential people on the Internet in a March 2015 list, and as one of the top 100 influential people overall in an April 2016 list, both compiled by Time magazine. Business Insider reported that eleven of the top twenty most-subscribed, independent YouTube publishers as of November 2014 are those that produce Let's Play videos. An October 2017 report from SuperData Researched estimated that between Let's Play videos and live streaming content of game video content, there were more people watching such videos than compared to all subscribers of HBO, Netflix, ESPN, and Hulu combined, with over 517 million YouTube users and 185 million Twitch users.

Let's Play videos have been considered a favorable way to market game titles, in particularly for smaller developers. In one case for Thomas Was Alone, Mike Bithell, its developer, attributed the success of the game to a Let's Play video by game commentator and critic John Bain, also known as TotalBiscuit. Similarly, Davey Wreden, the developer of The Stanley Parable developed a relationship with various Let's Play channels prior to the release to assure they could play and record his game; his team further created specialized demos for two popular channels (Rev3Games and Steam Train) that jokingly teased the specific players. Wreden believes this helped lead to the over 100,000 sales of the full game within the first three days of release. Some developers have designed their games to be favorable for Let's Play videos. The developers of Octodad: Dadliest Catch aimed to have the game covered by Let's Play videos by "creat[ing] a lot of room where there are a lot of different options for a player to create their own comedy and put their own personality into that".

The popularity of Let's Play and similar video commentaries have also led to changes in how some video games have been developed. The Let's Play approach favors games that are quirky and idiosyncratic that draw viewer attention, making some developers aim for these qualities in their games. It also helps for games in early access or beta release cycles as developers from such games can use these videos for feedback to improve their games prior to full release. The Let's Play videos also can bring in more attention to a niche title than traditional gaming press. The developers behind PlayerUnknown's Battlegrounds and Hello Neighbor, rather than try to aim for attracting attention from the major Let's Play creators like PewDiePie, instead used an approach of gaining interest from several mid-level creators to help with drawing attention to their games during their early access period, with considerable success. Some games such as Goat Simulator and I am Bread are considered by critics and players to have been purposely made to be the subject of Let's Plays on popular channels as to drive interest in an otherwise-lackluster game, and are usually derided as "YouTube bait".

Survival horror games, such as Five Nights at Freddy's and its sequels, which focus more on immersion than skill, are considered tailor-made to take advantage of Let's Play videos and other live-streaming play, as the games' design is aimed to shock the streaming users, providing humorous reactions such as jump scares that are a source of entertainment for viewers. This also provides a way for people who would not normally play such games for the discomfort of being scared by the game to find enjoyment in watching the reaction someone else has while playing it. The developers of both Amnesia: The Dark Descent and Outlast stated that Let's Plays of their games helps to make them successful considering that in neither case did they have a large promotional budget.

In at least one case, the popularity of a game featured in Let's Plays has led to further sales far after the game's typical shelf-life has expired. In 2014, Electronic Arts opted to print more copies of the 2010 title Skate 3 after its appearance on PewDiePie's and other Let's Play channels have kept sales of the game high, keeping it in the top 40 sales charts for new games in the United Kingdom and with its 2014 sales being 33% higher than its 2013 sales.

Let's Plays can also be seen harming a game's distribution particularly for short, linear, narrative-driven games since viewers can witness the entire game from a Let's Play recording without purchasing it and have no incentive to purchase the title. For the art game That Dragon, Cancer, its developer Ryan Green noted that while there were Let's Plays of the game, several of which commented emotionally on the game's topic, some of these playthroughs had simply played through the game without added commentary, and provided no links to where players could learn more about the title. Green and his team at Numinous Games had used YouTube's ContentID to have some of these videos taken down, a result that brought some complaints and which Green admitted later was not the right approach to address the issue. Green requested that with games such as That Dragon, Cancer, that those creating Let's Play use the playthrough of the game to initiate conversations with their viewers, and that viewers could show their appreciation of the game by tipping the developers in lieu of purchasing the full title.

The phenomenon of Let's Plays was a focal point for the South Park episode "#REHASH". Double Fine Productions and 2 Player Productions have worked together to create a series called "Devs Play", inspired by Let's Plays where game developers play through games and offer their commentary from a developer's perspective, typically alongside one of the developers from the selected game.

== Legal issues ==
=== Copyright ===
The copyright nature of "Let's Play" videos remains in question; while the developer or publisher of games typically possess the copyright and granted exclusive distribution rights on the media assets of the game, others cite fair use claims for these works as their nature is to provide commentary on the video game. An important distinction for Let's Plays to qualify as fair use would be their transformative nature; the more that the Let's Play creator or streamer adds as commentary atop the gameplay, the more likely that it would be ruled as fair use. However, copyright law favors the game developer or publisher; if challenged, the Let's Play creator would have to argue in court for a fair use defense, which can be costly to pursue. There have been no known cases of Let's Plays challenged in legal systems, keeping their legal nature in question.

Sites that host Let's Plays have sometimes sent a Digital Millennium Copyright Act (DMCA) takedown notice to streamers, at the behest of the copyright holders of the video game. However, in practice, game companies "tacitly permit YouTubers to violate their copyrights, with creators and publishers turning a blind eye out of consideration of the promotional value of being featured on high-audience channels". Sites that host user-created Let's Plays tend to favor the copyright holders to maintain their safe harbor status as part of their liability protection within the Digital Millennium Copyright Act (DMCA); for example, YouTube uses both manual and automated systems to detect copyright infringement and issues copyright strikes to offending channels.

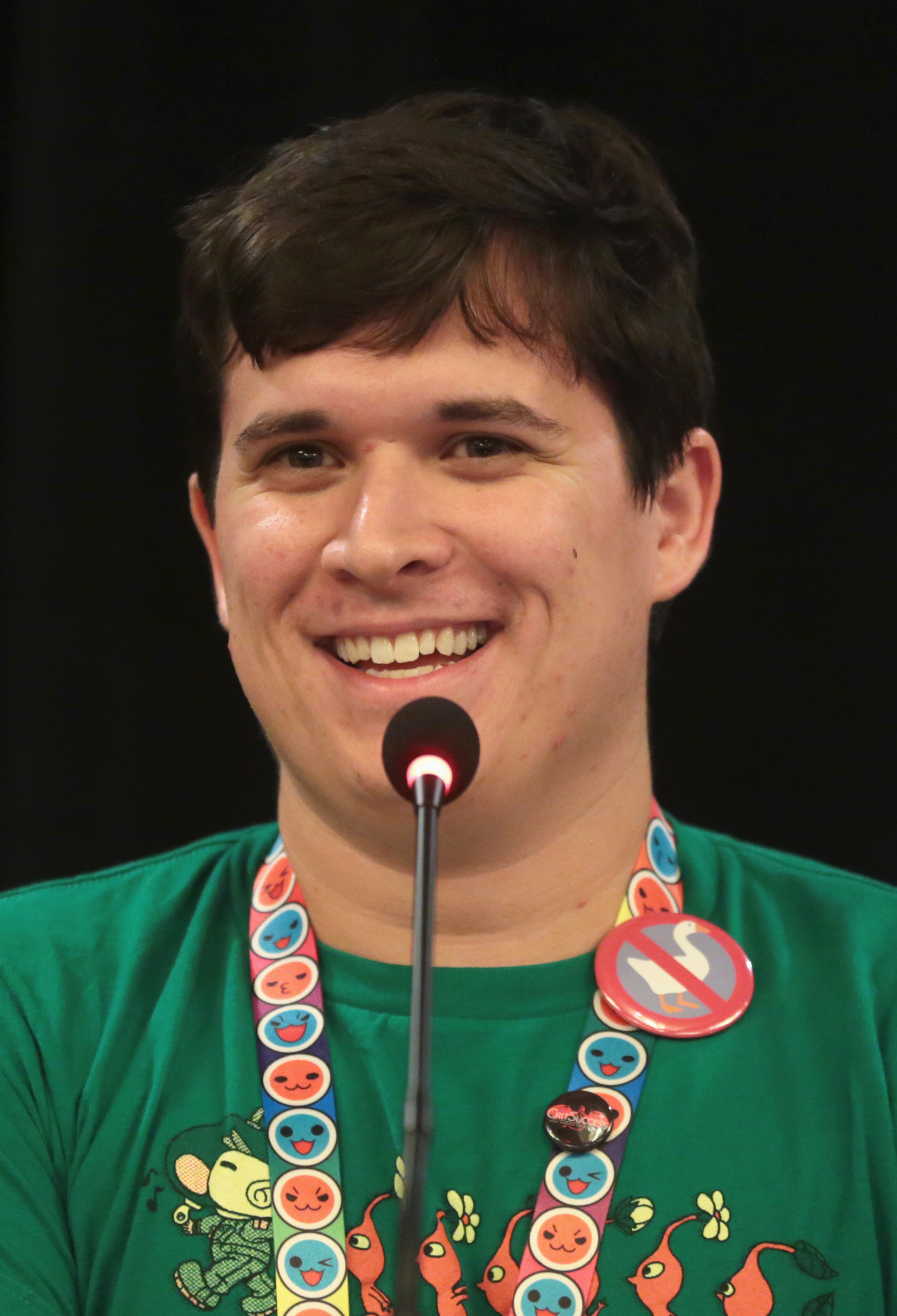
Chuggaaconroy (pictured in 2018) was among several Let's Play YouTubers initially affected by Nintendo's Content ID policy.

In May 2013, Nintendo registered Let's Play content of their games through YouTube's Content ID system such that they could generate ad revenue from user videos; several Nintendo based Let's Play personalities such as Chuggaaconroy, MasaeAnela and ZackScottGames were initially affected by Nintendo's Content ID policy during this time. Nintendo would eventually cease such claims, and later created its own affiliate program, the Nintendo Creators program, between themselves, Google, and proactive uploaders to split profits. Smaller developers have been more open to allowing Let's Play videos. Ubisoft has stated that it allows its games to be used in Let's Play videos and allows for those making them to monetize from any ad revenue as long they stay within certain content-appropriateness guidelines. Microsoft Studios similarly created a set of Game Content Usage Rules that sets certain requirements and limitations on those using its software for Let's Play videos.

In early December 2013, a change in YouTube's Content ID policy caused many existing Let's Play and other video-game related material to be blocked. In response, many developers and publishers issued statements and worked with YouTube to assure such videos were not meant to be blocked, helping those whose videos were affected, and encouraging users to continue to show these; these companies included Blizzard, Ubisoft, Capcom, Paradox Interactive, and Valve. YouTube later clarified that the change in the ContentID system that caused videos to be flagged was likely a result of new tools it made available for multi-channel networks, which can cover separate video and audio copyrights. At least two known music multi-channel networks, TuneCore and INDmusic, who represent many video game music composers and artists, had automatically enabled the copyright protection for all of its clients without seeking their input, and as such, many of the Let's Play videos as well as the game developers' own promotional videos were blocked due to these actions. YouTube states they do not plan to change this system despite complaints from the original music composers. The streaming website Twitch implemented a similar copyright control approach that would mute recorded streams for up to half-hour blocks if copyrighted music was discovered in August 2014, which was found to have the same problems with blocking Let's Plays that used original game music. This prompted Twitch to alter the method to reduce false positive and provide ways for users to challenge such claims.

Some games which have used licensed music, such as Concrete Jungle and Quantum Break, have provided a game option that disables licensed music playback or replaces this music with copyright-free music, making the games "stream-safe" to avoid being tagged as copyright infringing. In other cases, music licenses sites now consider the impact of Let's Plays on the video game marketing cycle, and offer broader licensing options for their music that includes their legal use in Let's Play for that game, and assurances that any Let's Plays tagged with ContentID violations would be remedied. Even though these can be resolved, the time it takes to clear the ContentID claim can be costly to Let's Play broadcasters as they lose advertising revenue on the video while it is offline, as well as losing impact for the developer and publisher of the game. Pinokl Games and tinyBuild, the developers and publishers, respectively, of Party Hard, had found Let's Plays of their game hit frequently with ContentID claims that were resolved by the music licensing service; they opted to craft a new YouTube-friendly soundtrack for this purpose to avoid these.

In 2022, the video game Cookie's Bustle had a resurgence after persistent use of the Digital Millennium Copyright Act to remove traces of the game's existence off of the internet. According to the International Online Copyright Office (Interoco) a specific copyright for the "Cookie's Bustle Gameplay Concept" was filed on January 23, 2022.

In May 2023, a Japanese YouTuber was arrested by Miyagi Prefectural Police for uploading gameplay videos of the visual novel Steins;Gate: My Darling's Embrace, as well as summary videos for the Spy × Family and Steins;Gate anime shows. According to Content Overseas Distribution Association (CODA), the issue in relation to gameplay was both because official guidelines restrict gameplay videos of the game to about one hour (including the ending) and because the videos were monetized; violating Japanese law of making money from copyrighted content.

=== Promotion and disclosure ===
Another legal issue related to Let's Play is disclosure. More popular YouTube channels will sometimes receive free promotional copies of games from developers and publishers in advance of release to promote the title. According to the US Federal Trade Commission, players that review or create commentary for such games should disclose the game if they subsequently make money from the review to stay within ethical business practices. In one specific scenario, John Bain, who has previously argued for clear disclosure of paid reviews, has revealed that he and several others were approached by Plaid Social, a marketing outlet for Warner Bros. Entertainment and offered promotional copies of the upcoming Middle-earth: Shadow of Mordor in exchange for meeting very specific tasks in their presentation. Bain refused on these terms, but other commentators had taken the deal without disclosure of the deal, raising the issue of how many of these works were made through paid reviews.

If an advertiser or marketer is offering to someone to write a favorable review, should be disclosed somewhere that is quite visible. According to Mary Engle, associate director for Advertising Practices at the Federal Trade Commission (FTC), "disclosure should basically be unavoidable by the viewer. Perhaps the most important line to note. If a viewer doesn't automatically see or hear the disclosure without having to go hunting for it, it's not legal disclosure". In the aforementioned situation with Plaid Social and Warner Bros., the FTC issued a fine against the two companies, which with Warner Bros. settled in July 2016 and agreed to new regulations that would fine them in the future should such sponsored videos not be disclosed. A similar situation arose as a result of the skin gambling issues raised in mid-2016, with the FTC further refining its guidelines related to promotional advertising on social media in September 2017.

=== Other issues ===
In some cases, developers or publishers have used the DMCA to take down Let's Plays and other videos that are highly critical of a game, using the copyright provisions in the DMCA to override free speech or fair use aspects allowed for by the law. A noted case is that of Digital Homicide Studios against game critic James Stephanie Sterling. Sterling had posted a let's play of Digital Homicide's The Slaughtering Grounds (2014) that noted numerous flaws in the game and called it as a potentially the worst game of 2014. Digital Homicide used a DMCA request to remove Sterling's video; Sterling was able file a counterclaim to restore the video. The action led to Digital Homicide's James Romine filing a $15 million defamation lawsuit against Sterling and 100 Steam users that left negative reviews of the game. The cases were ultimately dismissed or withdrawn.

DMCA claims have also been threatened or used to remove Let's Plays of games owned by a company who do not agree with ideals or morals of the person creating the video. In September 2017, Kjellberg blurted out a racist insult while live-streaming a game to viewers, later apologizing for this; this followed previous incidents of where Kjellberg's on-screen behavior had been criticized. Campo Santo's founder Sean Vanaman was dismayed by this, and issued a DMCA notice to takedown Kjellberg's Let's Play of their game Firewatch, stating that having their game shown on his YouTube channel was the equivalent of endorsing his ideologies; YouTube complied with this request a few days later. Vanaman later clarified that his goal was not to censor Kjellberg, but that there is a "bad fit" between Kjellberg's views and Campo Santo's views and would prefer that Kjellberg not cover his games. Lawyers and legal experts speaking to Kotaku, The Verge and PC Gamer believed that content owners like Campo Santo have full control to issue DMCA takedowns under the law, but whether these takedowns are valid under fair use defense within copyright law is unclear, since to this point there has been no case law to challenge the legality of Let's Plays and other video game video walkthroughs or challenges to DMCA takedowns for this type of content. Kjellberg did not plan to counter the DMCA claim but pointed out that the use of DMCA to take down videos due to issues other than related to copyright has a potential for abuse by game developers and publishers and affect the current balance of the value of Let's Plays in game promotion and marketing.

=== Trademark ===
Sony Computer Entertainment of America attempted to trademark the term "Let's Play" as applied to streaming and broadcasting of video games in the latter part of 2015, but the request was preliminarily denied by the United States Patent and Trademark Office citing an existing trademark. The MacArthur Law Firm, a firm specializing in video game legal matters, filed a formal petition to the Patent and Trademark office, citing that the denial should have been based on the claim that "Let's Play" has become a generic trademark and any further attempts to trademark the term should be denied. The Patent and Trademark office agreed, stating that the term "Let's Play" is now too generic to be trademarked.

== See also ==
- Actual play
- Game demo
- Game replay
- Video game live streaming
- YouTuber
- Reaction videos
