= Strategy guide =

Instruction book that contains hints or complete solutions to a specific video game

Strategy guides are instruction books that contain hints or complete solutions to specific video games. The line between strategy guides and video game walkthroughs is somewhat blurred, with the former often containing or being written around the latter. Strategy guides are often published in print, both in book form and also as articles within video game magazines. In cases of exceptionally popular game titles, guides may be sold through more mainstream publication channels, such as bookstores or even newsstands. Some publishers also sell e-book versions on their websites.

Strategy guides marketed as "official" are written by game distributors themselves or licensed to a specialty publishing house; Prima Games and Piggyback Interactive specialise in writing official guides for various companies. There are also a number of publishers who make unlicensed, "unofficial" strategy guides, and many of today's mainstream publishers began by making such guides.

== Typical contents ==
The contents of a strategy guide varies between game genres. Typically, the guides contain:

- Detailed gameplay information, for example, maneuvers that are not detailed in the manual.
- Complete maps of the game, which show the placement of all items (including hidden and hard-to-find ones).
- Detailed instructions for specific locations on how to proceed from there.
- Explanations of puzzles.
- Details of enemies, including techniques on defeating individual enemies (especially bosses), the segment for minor enemies is commonly referred to as a bestiary.
- Checklist of collectible items.
- Cheats and game editing, although this has been less common in official guides.
- Walkthroughs to help the player complete levels.
- Advice on tactics and strategies for use in multi-player (games with multi-player only)

== Publishing before game release ==
In order to be released at the same time as the game, commercial strategy guides are often based on a pre-release version of the game, rather than the final retail version; BradyGames' guide for Grand Theft Auto: San Andreas included misplaced item locations and a slightly different map, which made some directions impossible to follow. BradyGames rectified such mistakes by offering free errata pages for download from their website.

Strategy guides are sometimes published before the game itself is published. This can be risky because there is always the chance that a game will end up not being released. For example, in January 2001, Prima published a guide (ISBN 0-7615-3125-4) for the Dreamcast version of Half-Life, which was canceled late in development when Sega discontinued the console.

== Online guides ==
Online strategy guides and FAQs are hosted at sites such as GameFAQs and IGN FAQs, though much of this content is user generated and not published by the company. A number of other sites contain strategy guides, and videos in a number of niche areas, such as Role Playing Games or First Person Shooters. These sites may attract a more limited set of viewers, but can include more depth of content. Video-sharing sites such as YouTube have given rise to video walkthroughs using programs such as Fraps, which allows players to more easily mirror the strategies being described. These videos are re-posted to a number of sites.

Video game wikis are used as both strategy guides and documentation. Content is generated and edited completely by users. Wikis allow for information to updated if a developer introduced a new patch to the game. Wiki farms such as Fandom, Gamepedia and StrategyWiki host a large number of unofficial video game wikis while wikis can be integrated into the overall site such as IGN Wikis. While most wikis are considered unofficial and not supported by the developer, some developers may choose to do so for various reasons. These reasons may include resolving copyright issues and real world trading that may be found on unofficial wikis. For example, ArenaNet hosts an official wiki for Guild Wars and Guild Wars 2, citing that "it's often more complete and useful than the documentation that ArenaNet generates internally." Information on the wiki is integrated into the game, allowing players to access information from in game. Although the wiki is hosted by ArenaNet, the site is run and moderated by the community and contributions are released under GNU Free Document License (GDFL) similar to sites such as Wikipedia.

Aside from the quality of the content, the community aspect of fan walkthroughs is significant. One perspective argues that walkthroughs are shared stories for gamers and game fans. In creating walkthroughs, gamers actively create meaning for the games. This is similar to activities of traditional media such as books, films and television (e.g., fan fiction).

The increasing availability of free online FAQs and walkthroughs has taken away some of the demand for commercial strategy guides, although there is still a large market for them. Print guides often feature extensive picture-by-picture walkthroughs, maps, and game art, none of which is possible in the plain-text works hosted by prominent sites such as GameFAQs. Some newer sites allow strategy guides to be hosted in formats that allow pictures and videos, which further undercuts the advantages of print strategy guides.

Some publishers have tried combining their printed books with the Internet. In 2000, the Final Fantasy IX Official Strategy Guide was published by BradyGames, but much of the information was contained on Square's PlayOnline website. This seemed like a good way to promote PlayOnline, while creating a guide that would have updatable content, but it was widely panned. Players saw no need of buying a book if a significant part of the content was online; and there was no point paying for online content from one site, if it was available for free on another site. As a result, Square abandoned the online strategy guide concept and released traditional printed guides for future games.

== Criticism ==
Games journalist and guide writer Alan Emrich has criticized strategy guides for:

- Containing only facts which should have been in the game manual, e.g. about the user interface.
- Failing to teach users how to improve their play.
- Failing to provide information which helps them to make decisions, e.g. about the capabilities and costs of units and buildings.
- Being inaccurate, often because the developers have tweaked the game during the publication lead time.

The faults, he says, are mainly caused by the game publishers' and guide publishers' haste to get their products on to the market; "[previously] strategy guides were published after a game was released so that they could be accurate, even to the point of including information changes from late game 'patch' releases."

== Lists ==
=== Best-selling guide books ===
Title	Author(s)	Year	Sales	Game(s)	Ref
Final Fantasy VIII Ultimania	Studio BentStuff	1999	2,200,000	Final Fantasy VIII	
Mastering Pac-Man	Ken Uston	1981	1,700,000	Pac-Man	
Final Fantasy VII Kaitai Shinsho	Studio BentStuff	1997	1,700,000	Final Fantasy VII	
Super Mario Bros: The Complete Strategy Guide	Tokuma Shoten, Naoto Yamamoto	1985	1,300,000	Super Mario Bros.	
Myst: The Official Strategy Guide	Rusel DeMaria, Rick Barba	1993	1,200,000	Myst	
Final Fantasy X Scenario Ultimania	Studio BentStuff	2001	1,000,000	Final Fantasy X	
How to Master the Video Games	Tom Hirschfeld	1981	650,000	Arcade games	
Tomb Raider III strategy guide	Unknown	1999	350,000	Tomb Raider III	

=== Best-selling guide series ===
Series	Sales	Revenue	Games	Ref
Ultimania	12,000,000	Unknown	Square Enix games	
Pokémon strategy books	Unknown	$142,000,000	Pokémon series	
Metal Gear Solid strategy guides	3,000,000	Unknown	Metal Gear Solid series	
Pac-Man guide books	1,700,000+	Unknown	Pac-Man	
Grand Theft Auto guide books	1,600,000	Unknown	Grand Theft Auto series	

== See also ==
- Golden age of video arcade games
- Video game walkthrough
- Universal Hint System
