= University of Health Sciences =

University of Health Sciences or Health Sciences University may refer to:

== University of Health Sciences ==
- Dow University of Health Sciences, Pakistan
- University of Health Sciences and Pharmacy in St. Louis, St. Louis, Missouri, U.S.
- Hyogo University of Health Sciences, Japan
- National University of Health Sciences, Lombard, Illinois, U.S.
- University of Health Sciences (Antigua)
- University of Health Sciences (Cambodia)
- University of Health Sciences, Lahore, Pakistan
- University of Health Sciences (Turkey)
- Western University of Health Sciences, Pomona, California, U.S.

=== India ===
- Baba Farid University of Health Sciences
- Dr. YSR University of Health Sciences
- Kaloji Narayana Rao University of Health Sciences
- Kerala University of Health Sciences
- Maharashtra University of Health Sciences
- Odisha University of Health Sciences
- Pandit Bhagwat Dayal Sharma University of Health Sciences
- Rajasthan University of Health Sciences
- Rajiv Gandhi University of Health Sciences
- Srimanta Sankaradeva University of Health Sciences
- West Bengal University of Health Sciences

== Health Sciences University ==
- Afyonkarahisar Health Sciences University, Turkey
- Baptist Health Sciences University, Memphis, Tennessee, U.S.
- Health Science University (Fujikawaguchiko, Japan)
- Health Sciences University of Hokkaido, Japan
- Health Sciences University (United Kingdom)
- Ponce Health Sciences University, Ponce, Puerto Rico
- California Health Sciences University, Clovis, California, U.S.
- SUNY Downstate Health Sciences University, New York City, New York, U.S.
