= Something Awful =

American comedy website, founded 1999

- Company type: Limited liability company
- Founded: November 16, 1999; 27 years ago
- Headquarters: Formerly Pleasant Hill, Missouri, U.S.
- Founder: Richard Kyanka
- Key people: Richard Kyanka; Zack Parsons; David Thorpe; Jeffrey of YOSPOS
- Industry: Internet
- Website: somethingawful.com

Something Awful (SA) is an American comedy internet culture website hosting content including blog entries, forums, feature articles, digitally edited pictures, and humorous media reviews. It was created by Richard "Lowtax" Kyanka in 1999 as a largely personal website, but as it grew, so did its contributors and content. The website has helped to perpetuate various Internet phenomena, and it has been cited as a significant influence on Internet culture. In 2018, Gizmodo named it in their list of the 100 websites that "shaped the internet".

The website has been involved in a number of events. These include a conflict with the Spam Prevention Early Warning System, a Hurricane Katrina relief fund being caught in PayPal's red tape, an exhibition boxing match between Kyanka and the filmmaker Uwe Boll, and the creation of the Slender Man.

== History ==
Something Awful was created by Richard "Lowtax" Kyanka. Kyanka started Something Awful several months before leaving his previous job, after using his "Cranky Steve" persona to write a comedic website update deriding the attitude and work performance of a fellow Planet Quake administrator. He moved the "Cranky Steve" personality he had created to the Something Awful site in 1999. In the years immediately following Something Awful's launch, several sponsors, including GameFan and eFront, failed to compensate Kyanka as promised for advertising on the site.

In 2001, the site began charging $10 for accounts with forum access. Only members can post messages or threads; to encourage new registrations, the forums are only intermittently viewable by unregistered users. The site and forums draw continuous income from fees for new accounts, forum upgrades such as custom avatars and access to the forum archives and search features, and merchandise sales.

On October 9, 2020, following a backlash from the community in response to allegations that Kyanka was a domestic abuser, Kyanka sold Something Awful to a fifteen-year member and moderator known under the pseudonym of Jeffrey of YOSPOS. Following its sale, Kyanka was banned from Something Awful on March 23, 2021. On November 9, 2021, Kyanka died by suicide.

=== Spam Prevention Early Warning System ===
On July 20, 2003, the spam filtering organization Spam Prevention Early Warning System (SPEWS) added an entire class-B subnet with the Cogent ISP to their spammer list, since Cogent was hosting a known spammer that SPEWS found difficult to block. Something Awful was added to the list in the process, disrupting its ability to communicate with its customers who were using SPEWS. Upon appeal, SPEWS initially refused to delist SA. The Something Awful administrators responded by telling their users to post their support in the Usenet newsgroup news.admin.net-abuse.blocklisting. However, that group and news.admin.net-abuse.email were flooded with off-topic posts and trolls from Something Awful users, incensing SPEWS advocates. The SA administrators claimed that SPEWS was attempting to hack the Something Awful server. Forum users responded by threatening to perform a distributed denial-of-service attack on SPEWS, although this type of behavior was strongly discouraged by Kyanka and assistant editor Zack Parsons.

=== GreenMeat Body Armor charity drive ===
Something Awful forum user GreenMeat deployed to Iraq in 2004, despite his unit not having hard body armor. SA forum users, along with help from Fark users, raised over $20,000 to buy body armor, plate carriers, and assorted care packages for a group of 31 soldiers.

=== Hurricane Katrina charity ===
As Something Awful's servers were located in New Orleans, the site temporarily went offline in August 2005 during the flooding from Hurricane Katrina. After the site was brought to a semi-functional state, Kyanka set up a link to a PayPal account where people could donate money to the survivors of the hurricane via the Red Cross. Kyanka put in $3,000 of his own money, and promised to give some free merchandise to anyone who donated more than $10. PayPal froze the donation account, then stated that they would unfreeze the account once it was provided with proof of shipping from aggrieved buyers. Due to the nature of the collection, there were no actual "buyers", and it was impossible to provide proof of shipping for donation. Eventually, Kyanka contacted a customer service representative over the phone, and asked to have PayPal donate all of the money to the American Red Cross. However, he was told that PayPal would only give the money to United Way of America due to their business affiliation; Kyanka initially agreed, but after receiving several emails from readers detailing alleged corruption and inefficiency within United Way, he changed his mind and told PayPal to refund all of the money to the individual donors. PayPal refunded the money, but did not refund exchange and handling fees for international donors.

=== Shooting deaths ===
In 2005, William Freund sought advice in the Something Awful gun subforum about purchasing Hevi-Shot brand ammunition several days before embarking on a "shooting rampage", during which he killed two people before taking his own life. Freund had stated in the thread, which was closed before the killing spree, along with his ability to post comments being revoked, that he intended to use the ammunition to defend his Halloween pumpkins from vandals.

=== Uwe Boll fight ===
In June 2006, Kyanka accepted an open challenge from German movie director Uwe Boll, who had offered to fight critics of his movies in a series of ten-round boxing matches. Something Awful had posted a humorous review that was critical of one of his films. The event took place in Vancouver, Canada, on September 23, 2006; after being knocked down several times and eventually forfeiting the fight in the first round, Kyanka claimed that he had been told by Boll, a trained amateur boxer, that the fight would be just for show. To that effect, Kyanka purportedly acted like a silent film comedy character during the fight rather than seriously attempting to fight Uwe Boll.

=== Death of Sean Smith ===
Sean Smith, a US Foreign Service Information Management Officer, as well as a Something Awful forum moderator and leading member of the Goonswarm Federation alliance (which originated in part from the Something Awful forums) in the video game Eve Online, was killed in the 2012 Benghazi attack on September 11, 2012. Eve Online players paid respect to Smith by renaming in-game space stations after him.

== Site content ==
The frontpage article series Golan the Insatiable is the basis of an animated series of the same name that premiered on Animation Domination on Fox on July 27, 2013.

In 2014, the American Folklife Center announced that Something Awful was one of the sites it would be archiving as part of its efforts to compile a history of digital culture.

=== Forums ===
The site is home to a collection of Internet forums running a highly customized version of vBulletin, charging a one-time registration fee of US$9.95 for posting privileges and full access to the forums, with additional user account and forum features available for purchase at prices ranging from US$4.95 to US$29.95.

The forums have spread several Internet memes, such as "all your base are belong to us". Additionally, image macros originated on the site in 2001, originally as a vBulletin feature introduced by Kyanka. The forum's users refer to themselves as "Goons". A weekly activity is "Photoshop Phriday", where users will modify existing images to create parodies through the use of image-editing software such as Adobe Photoshop. The website also highlights some of what its administrators believe to be exceptional forum threads in the Comedy Goldmine feature. A forum member, moot, also launched 4chan after hentai was banned, and the Let's Play phenomenon originated in posts on the Something Awful forums.

The "Groverhaus" internet meme originated with a 2006 thread by the forum moderator "Grover", documenting the building process of a do it yourself extension to his house, which has been mocked online for its poor design and execution. The phrase "load-bearing drywall" was coined in response to the thread.

Many originators of "Weird Twitter", including dril, originally posted in Something Awful's Fuck You and Die forum. The Slender Man urban legend was created in a 2009 thread in the Something Awful forum. The 2015 video game Dropsy originated as a 2008 CYOA thread on the Something Awful forums.

A 2017 bathroom renovation by forum user "bEatmastrJ" became an internet meme mockingly called the "Doom bathroom" after its design. In 2019, a playable Doom II map of the bathroom called BATHDOOM was created by Twitter user Dieting Hippo. The house was listed for sale in 2025.

== See also ==
- List of Internet forums
- 4chan
- Anonymous (group)
- Digg
- Encyclopedia Dramatica
- Fark
- Know Your Meme
- News aggregator
- Reddit
- Slowbeef
