= Video game walkthrough =

Guide to assist players in a video game

A video game walkthrough is a guide aimed towards improving a player's skill within a particular video game and often designed to assist players in completing either an entire video game or specific elements. Walkthroughs may alternatively be set up as a playthrough, where players record themselves playing through a game and upload or live-stream it to the internet. Walkthroughs may be considered guides on helping to enhance the experience of players, to assist towards unlocking game achievements or simply as a means to socialise with like-minded individuals as a distraction from everyday life.

Walkthroughs originated as text-based descriptive instructions in magazines for playing through a video game. With the growth in popularity of computers and the internet, video game walkthroughs expanded to digital and video formats, with the typical average age of watchers being 23 years old and predominantly male, according to a study undertaken in Finland during 2015. Some individuals and companies have been known to earn lucrative income through the process of recording and offering guides publicly.

== History ==
With the growth in popularity of video gaming in the early 1980s, a new genre of video game guide book emerged that anticipated walkthroughs. Written by and for gamers, books such as The Winners' Book of Video Games (1982) and How To Beat the Video Games (1982) focused on revealing underlying gameplay patterns and translating that knowledge into mastering games. The term walk-through was used to describe step-by-step video game solutions as early as 1984 in the game guide compilation Conquering Adventure Games; this usage of the term was established by 1988 and popularized with the publication of Quest for Clues, a collection of guides for adventure games and role-playing video games that referred to its solutions as "walkthroughs".

Video game walkthroughs were originally included in video game magazines or on text-bulletin boards, and compiled in guide book anthologies. In the late 1980s through to the mid 2000s, video game walkthroughs were also available through telephone 'hot-lines' in the United States. In the 1980s, walkthrough anthology books were popular and lucrative alternatives to single-game hint books published by game developers, such as Infocom's InvisiClues series. Despite the rise in popularity of internet-based guides, text-based walkthroughs are still present today in both print and digital formats. Examples of print publications include strategy guides published by Prima Games, whereas text-based digital guides are hosted on gaming websites such as IGN, GamesRadar, and GameFAQs, often in the form of wikis. Until its closure by parent company Future plc, Computer and Video Games (CVG) also created and hosted digital guides on their now defunct website.

Player created digital walkthroughs are typically designed to assist other players in accomplishing certain feats within video games (Note: Examples of certain feats that this video content may help players accomplish are completing everything there is to do within a video game (usually involving collecting all 'achievements', also referred to as '100% game completion' in most video games), gaining specific achievements within a particular video game, demonstrating glitches within a video game and telling players how to reproduce such glitches.) and are similar to text-based or telephony-based walkthroughs, except they can also be solely for entertainment purposes. These digital walkthroughs are typically uploaded to video sharing websites such as YouTube or live-streamed playthroughs to media streaming sites such as Twitch. Let's Play videos are a special type of walkthrough generally more focused on entertaining rather than informing the viewer through humorous commentary given by the video's host as they complete the game.

== Format ==
Cover of Prima Games text-based video game guide magazine

Given there is no standardized format for the creation of text-based walkthroughs, guides exist that contain extensive examples and step-by-step instructions on how to write text-based walkthrough content. Prima Games and Computer and Video Games have produced walkthroughs. Prima Games produces official, dedicated text-based video game walkthroughs and strategy guides for a variety of video games in both print and digital formats. Computer and Video Games (CVG) published both text and video-based walkthroughs of video games on their website and official YouTube channel until their closure by Future in February 2015 in asset consolidation between various Future brands. IGN also creates and publishes video game walkthroughs in both text and video formats. With the establishment of the wiki-concept at the start of the 21st century, walkthroughs have also been created collaboratively by players on sites such as StrategyWiki.

When it comes to video walkthroughs of games, gameplay may be recorded in multiple ways, such as through the use of screencast software, built-in recording features in some emulators or via a video capture device (Note: Examples of video capture devices could be the line of Elgato Game Capture recording products or the Roxio Game Capture) connected to a console or another computer. Some video games also include built-in recording features, such as Grand Theft Auto V (2013), which included in-game recording and editing features in its PlayStation 4 and Xbox One re-releases, allowing players to record and edit gameplay to share with others. Video content is typically shared over the internet via streaming, using video sharing and media streaming websites such as YouTube and Twitch, where the content has a potential audience consisting of millions of people.

== Motivations ==
In a study on the different motivations of walkthrough viewers conducted by Max Sjöblom and Juho Hamari from the University of Tampere in 2016, numerous viewer motivations were discussed. From the findings, the five most significant motivations were found to be improving player experience, confidence, knowledge about a particular game, socializing and creating an 'escape' or distraction from their everyday life. Walkthroughs may also guide players throughout an entire game or only certain sections and may be guides on finding rare collectables or unlocking achievements.

According to Barbara Ortutay of the Associated Press, players "not only see the live and recorded video sessions as a way to sharpen their abilities, but also as a way to interact with star players in chatrooms or simply be entertained." According to Business Insider and The Verge, viewers of this genre of video content and live streams use them not only for their entertainment value, but also to assist with a variety of things ranging from purchasing decisions to "get[ting] better at playing games." GameRadar+ has called the watching of video game playthroughs the "Netflix of video games" and CNN declared the watching of video games being played by other people via videos and live streams "must-see TV".

Some video game players have been able to make a viable business model out of playing video games as both a guide and for the entertainment of viewers; internet personalities such as TheRadBrad, DanTDM, Chuggaaconroy and Ali-A have been cited as examples of video game players who have been able to make money from creating video game walkthroughs. As a result of the influx of players uploading or streaming their content, multi-channel networks were formed in order to assist content creators in multiple areas, in exchange for a percentage of the advertisement revenue generated.

== Demographics ==
In February 2015, a study of video game walkthrough viewers was conducted by the University of Tampere in Finland and recruited respondents through self-selection (over 93% reported to have a Twitch account). From 1091 validated responses, the average age was approximately 23 years old, of which 92.3% were male. The majority of respondents earned less than ten thousand dollars a year with a secondary level of education. The majority of viewers have a secondary level of education (52.19%), with all other education levels tending to watch less. (Note: 0.18% no education, 8.67% primary level, and 38.96% upper level education)

View source data.

== See also ==
- Longplay (video games)
