= C418 discography =

List of works by German musician C418

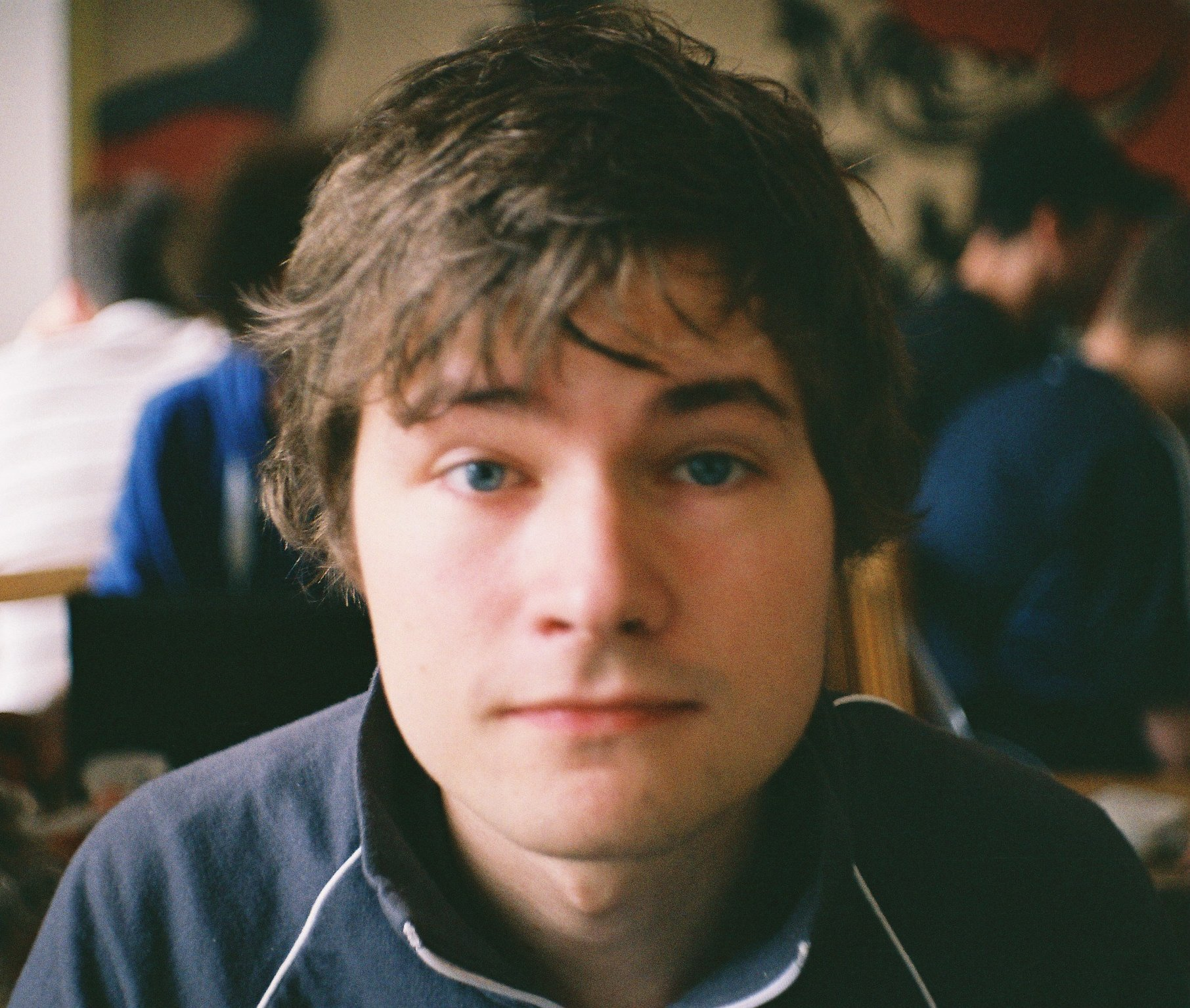
- Rosenfeld in 2011
- Studio albums: 9
- EPs: 7
- Compilation albums: 9
- Singles: 7
- Music videos: 3
- Mixtapes: 2
- Remixes: 11

The following is a comprehensive discography of C418, the pseudonym of German electronic musician Daniel Rosenfeld and who is best known for producing the majority of the soundtrack of the 2011 video game Minecraft. His discography comprises nine major studio albums, five Bandcamp exclusive studio albums, nine compilation albums, seven EPs, two mixtapes, 11 remixes, seven singles and three music videos. Rosenfeld has also completed a third volume of the Minecraft soundtrack, but citing licensing issues with Microsoft, the album has not been released.

== Albums ==
Albums are split based on release on major digital download platforms, as opposed to free downloads on Bandcamp.

=== Studio albums ===
List of studio albums, with selected details and chart positions
Title	Details	Peak chart positions				Certifications
Title	Details	AUS	BEL (WA)	NZ	US Dance	Certifications
Life Changing Moments Seem Minor in Pictures (Note: Stylised in lowercase on Bandcamp)	Released: 12 August 2010^{[note1]}; Label: None (self-released); Formats: Digital download, streaming	—	—	—	—	
Minecraft – Volume Alpha	Released: 4 March 2011; Label: None (self-released), Ghostly Intl.; Formats: Digital download, streaming, CD, vinyl, cassette	26	154	31	5	RIAA: Platinum
72 Minutes of Fame	Released: 19 July 2011; Label: None (self-released); Formats: Digital download, streaming, CD	—	—	—	—	
One	Released: 23 December 2012; Label: None (self-released); Formats: Digital download, streaming, CD	—	—	—	—	
Minecraft – Volume Beta	Released: 9 November 2013; Label: None (self-released), Ghostly Intl.; Formats: Digital download, streaming, CD, vinyl, cassette	68	—	—	14	
148	Released: 18 December 2015; Label: None (self-released); Formats: Digital download, streaming	—	—	—	—	
Dief	Released: 13 March 2017; Label: None (self-released); Formats: Digital download, streaming	—	—	—	—	
Excursions	Released: 7 September 2018; Label: None (self-released), Driftless Recordings; Formats: Digital download, streaming, CD, vinyl	—	—	—	—	
Wanderstop	Released: 11 March 2025; Label: None (self-released); Formats: Digital download, streaming	—	—	—	—	
Wanderstop FM	Released: 8 April 2025; Label: None (self-released); Formats: Digital download, streaming	—	—	—	—	
"—" denotes a recording that did not chart or was not released in that territory.

Based on the original Bandcamp release. The album was released on major streaming platforms on 16 July 2021.

Key
†	Denotes albums that have not been released

=== Bandcamp exclusive full-length albums ===
Title	Details
The Whatever Director's Cut	Released: 27 January 2008^{[note2]}; Label: None (self-released); Formats: Digital Download
Zweitonegoismus	Released: 16 December 2008; Label: None (self-released); Formats: Digital download
Bushes and Marshmallows	Released: 1 August 2009; Label: None (self-released); Formats: Digital download
A Cobblers Tee Thug (with Sohnemann)	Released: 5 January 2010; Label: None (self-released); Formats: Digital download
Circle	Released: 22 March 2010^{[note3]}; Label: None (self-released); Formats: Digital download

C418 discontinued the release of The Whatever Director's Cut and is no longer available on Bandcamp. It was available until 2013.

Circle's release date is disputed. It is listed as 22 March 2006 on Bandcamp. However, development on the game only began in 2008. Bandcamp's source code states that the album was uploaded on 22 March 2010.

=== Compilation albums ===
Title	Details
BAM	Released: 2007–2009; Label: None (self-released); Formats: Digital download
Zombie Dog in Crazyland	Released: 20 March 2008; Label: None (self-released); Formats: Digital download
Mixes	Released: 23 May 2008; Label: None (self-released); Formats: Digital download
Little Things	Released: 16 January 2011; Label: None (self-released); Formats: Digital download
I Forgot Something, Didn't I.	Released: 18 July 2011; Label: None (self-released); Formats: Digital download
Seven Years of Server Data	Released: 3 November 2011; Label: None (self-released); Formats: Digital download
2 Years of Failure	Released: 13 September 2016; Label: None (self-released); Formats: Digital download
Old Garbage	Released: 21 January 2017; Label: None (self-released); Formats: Digital download
Random Stuff	Released: 17 March 2020; Label: None (self-released); Formats: Digital download

== Extended plays ==
Title	Details
BPS	Released: 23 December 2007; Label: None (self-released); Formats: Digital download
Sine	Released: 2 September 2008; Label: None (self-released); Formats: Digital download
Catacomb Snatch Original Soundtrack (with Anosou)	Released: 20 March 2012; Label: Mojang; Formats: Digital download
Yiff Dad	Released: 1 April 2017; Label: None (self-released); Formats: Streaming^{[note4]}
Branching Out	Released: 15 May 2021; Label: Branch.gg; Formats: Streaming
Cookie Clicker	Released: 1 September 2021; Label: None (Self-released); Formats: Digital download, streaming

Yiff Dad was originally released on SoundCloud as an April Fools joke, but is no longer available.

== Singles ==
Title	Year	Album
"The Driver" (C418 Remix) (by Savlonic)	2012	Non-album singles
"0x10c"	2014	Non-album singles
"Beton"	2018	Excursions
"Dragon Fish"	2018	Non-album single
"Thunderbird"	2018	Excursions
"Shuniji"	2018	Non-album singles
"Axolotl"	2018	Non-album singles
"Wanderstop"	2024	Wanderstop (soundtrack)
"Endless Velocity"	2025	Wanderstop (soundtrack)
"Pumpkin"	2025	Wanderstop (soundtrack)

=== Other certified singles ===
Title	Year	Certifications	Album
"Subwoofer Lullaby"	2011	RIAA: Gold	Minecraft – Volume Alpha
"Minecraft"	2011	RIAA: Gold	Minecraft – Volume Alpha
"Sweden"	2011	RIAA: Gold; RMNZ: Gold	Minecraft – Volume Alpha

== Guest appearances ==
Title	Year	Album
"Atempause"	2011	The Binding of Isaac Soundtrack
"BGC418" (Big Giant Circles featuring C418)	2011	Impostor Nostalgia
"185" (Baiyon featuring C418)	2017	We Are
"Quiet"	2022	I Was a Teenage Exocolonist (Original Soundtrack)

== Remixes ==
Title	Year	Original song	Original artist(s)	Album
"Atempause"	2011	"Respite"	Danny Baranowsky	The Binding of Isaac; Seven Years of Server Data
"Cobalt Something Something"	2011	"Cobalt"	Anosou	Cobalt EP; Seven Years of Server Data
"Meatcraft"	2011	"Hot Damned"	Danny Baranowsky	Super Meat Boy; I Forgot Something, Didn't I.
"Tonic"	2011	"Tonic"	Lusine Icl	Seven Years of Server Data
"Lemons"	2011	"Lemons"	Weebl	Seven Years of Server Data
"The Driver" (C418 Remix)	2012	"The Driver"	Savlonic	The Driver - Savlonic (C418 Remix)
"Kompass"	2013	"Compass"	Disasterpeace	FZ: Side F 148
"Jimtention"	2014	"A Rose in a Field"	Big Giant Circles	The Glory Days Remixed; 148
"Stranger Think"	2016	"Stranger Things (Main Theme)"	Kyle Dixon and Michael Stein	2 Years of Failure
"The Sea" (C418 Remix)	2019	"The Sea"	Floex	Machinarium Remixed
"Sä Oot Olemassa" (C418 Remix)	2020	"Sä Oot Olemassa"	Jukio Kallio	Sä Oot Olemassa Remixes
"Your Love" (C418 Remix)	2022	"Your Love"	Qrion	I Hope It Lasts Forever (Remixed)
"Your Love" (C418 Extended Mix)	2022	"Your Love"	Qrion	I Hope It Lasts Forever (Remixed)

=== Mixtapes ===
Title	Details
2016 Memorial Mixtape	Released: 1 January 2017; Formats: Streaming
2017 Memorial Mixtape	Released: 18 December 2017; Formats: Streaming

== Music videos ==
Title	Year	Director(s)	Album
"Unreasonable"	2010	none	Bushes and Marshmallows
"Thunderbird"	2018	Roshis Garden	Excursions
"Aviva"	2019	none	Excursions
