= Leitmotif =

Short, constantly recurring musical phrase

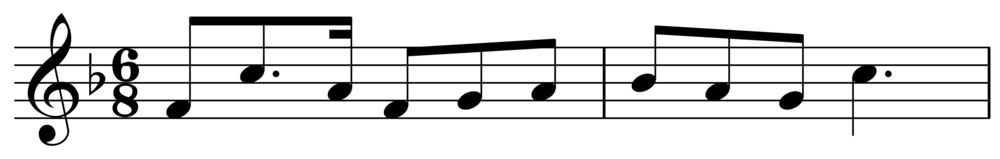
Leitmotif associated with Siegfried's horn call in Richard Wagner's 1876 opera, Siegfried

A leitmotif or Leitmotiv (/ˌlaɪtmoʊˈtiːf/) is a "short, recurring musical phrase" associated with a particular person, place, or idea. It is closely related to the musical concepts of idée fixe or motto-theme. The spelling leitmotif is a partial anglicization of the German Leitmotiv (IPA: [ˈlaɪtmoˌtiːf]), literally meaning "leading motif", or "guiding motif". A musical motif has been defined as a "short musical idea ... melodic, harmonic, or rhythmic, or all three", a salient recurring figure, musical fragment or succession of notes that has some special importance in or is characteristic of a composition: "the smallest structural unit possessing thematic identity".

In particular, such a motif should be "clearly identified so as to retain its identity if modified on subsequent appearances" whether such modification be in terms of rhythm, harmony, orchestration or accompaniment. It may also be "combined with other leitmotifs to suggest a new dramatic condition" or development. The technique is notably associated with the operas of Richard Wagner, and most especially his Der Ring des Nibelungen, although he was not its originator and did not employ the word in connection with his work.

Although usually a short melody, it can also be a chord progression or even a simple rhythm. Leitmotifs can help to bind a work together into a coherent whole, and also enable the composer to relate a story without the use of words, or to add an extra level to an already present story.

By association, the word has also been used to mean any sort of recurring theme (whether or not subject to developmental transformation) in literature, or (metaphorically) the life of a fictional character or a real person. It is sometimes also used in discussion of other musical genres, such as instrumental pieces, cinema, and video game music, sometimes interchangeably with the more general category of theme.

== Classical music ==
=== Early instances in classical music ===
The use of characteristic, short, recurring motifs in orchestral music can be traced back to the early seventeenth century, such as L'Orfeo by Monteverdi. In French opera of the late eighteenth century, such as the works of Gluck, Grétry and Méhul, "reminiscence motif" can be identified, which may recur at a significant juncture in the plot to establish an association with earlier events. Their use, however, is not extensive or systematic. The power of the technique was exploited early in the nineteenth century by composers of Romantic opera, such as Carl Maria von Weber, where recurring themes or ideas were sometimes used in association with specific characters. For example, Samiel in Der Freischütz is coupled with the chord of a diminished seventh. The first use of the word leitmotif in print was by the critic Friedrich Wilhelm Jähns in describing Weber's work in 1871.

Motifs figured occasionally in purely instrumental music of the Romantic period. The related idea of a musical idée fixe, i.e. the object of fixation — a term borrowed from psychology and found in literary works of the period, was employed by Hector Berlioz in his 1830 Symphonie fantastique. This purely instrumental, programmatic work, subtitled Episode in the Life of an Artist ... in Five Sections, features a recurring melody representing the object of the artist's obsessive affection and depicting his presence in various real and imagined situations.

Though perhaps not corresponding to the strict definition of leitmotif, several of Verdi's operas feature similar thematic tunes, often introduced in the overtures or preludes, and recurring to mark the presence of a character or to invoke a particular sentiment. In La forza del destino, the opening theme of the overture recurs whenever Leonora feels guilt or fear. In Il trovatore, the theme of the first aria by Azucena is repeated whenever she invokes the horror of how her mother was burnt alive and the devastating revenge she attempted then.

In Don Carlos, there are at least three leitmotifs that recur regularly across the five acts: the first is associated with the poverty and suffering from war, the second is associated with prayers around the tomb of Carlos V, and the third is introduced as a duet between Don Carlo and the Marquis of Posa, thereafter accentuating sentiments of sincere friendship and loyalty.

=== Wagner ===
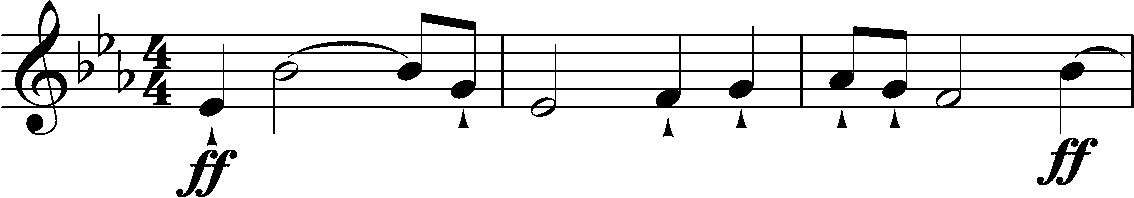
Siegfried's heroism leitmotif, a variation of his horn call motif, from the prologue to act 1 of Wagner's opera Götterdämmerung, the fourth of his Ring cycle The theme is broader and more richly orchestrated than its earlier appearances, suggesting the emergence of Siegfried's heroic character.

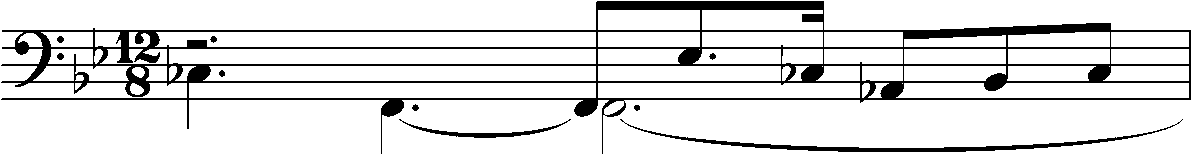
A more sinister version of the horn call motif, articulated as a half-diminished seventh arpeggio, "music of dark strength and magnificence", occurs in "Hagen's Watch" towards the end of act 1 of Götterdämmerung. Hagen, who eventually murders Siegfried, contemplates ways of using the benighted hero to further his own ends.

Richard Wagner is the earliest composer most specifically associated with the concept of leitmotif. His cycle of four operas, Der Ring des Nibelungen, written between 1853 and 1869, uses hundreds of leitmotifs, often related to specific characters, things, or situations. While some of these leitmotifs occur in only one of the operas, many recur throughout the entire cycle. Wagner had raised the issue of how music could best unite disparate elements of the plot of a music drama in his essay Opera and Drama (1851). The leitmotif technique corresponds to this ideal.

Some controversy surrounded the use of the word in Wagner's own circle: Wagner never authorised the use of the word Leitmotiv, using words such as Grundthema (basic idea), or simply Motiv. His preferred name for the technique was Hauptmotiv (principal motif), which he first used in 1877. The only time he used the word Leitmotiv, he referred to "so-called Leitmotivs".

The word gained currency with the overly literal interpretations of Wagner's music by Hans von Wolzogen, who in 1876 published a Leitfaden (guide or manual) to the Ring. In it he claimed to have isolated and named all of the recurring motifs in the cycle, the motif of "Servitude", the "Spear" or "Treaty" motif, etc., often leading to absurdities or contradictions with Wagner's actual practice. Some of the motifs he identified began to appear in the published musical scores of the operas, arousing Wagner's annoyance. His wife Cosima Wagner quoted him as saying "People will think all this nonsense is done at my request!".

Wagner never publicly named any of his leitmotifs, preferring to emphasize their flexibility of association, role in the musical form, and emotional effect. The practice of naming leitmotifs nevertheless continued, featuring in the work of prominent Wagnerian critics Ernest Newman, Deryck Cooke and Robert Donington.

The resulting lists of leitmotifs also attracted the ridicule of anti-Wagnerian critics and composers, such as Eduard Hanslick, Claude Debussy, and Igor Stravinsky. They identified the motif with Wagner's own approach to composing, mocking the impression of a musical "address book" or list of "cloakroom numbers" it created.

Later commentators have defended Wagner's use of the leitmotif. According to Pierre Boulez, "Wagner's was the first music in which forms never return literally, are never repeated. As the music progresses, it carries all the thematic elements with it, linking them in new ways, placing them in different relations to each other, showing them in unfamiliar lights and giving them unexpected meanings." Boulez adds: "Leitmotivs are in fact anything but the traffic signals to which they have been mistakenly compared, for they have a double virtue – both poetic and dramatic, as well as formal. They are essential to the structure of both music and drama as well as to the different characters and situations. Their evolution is a kind of 'time-weave', an integrating of past and present; and they also imply dramatic progression."

=== After Wagner ===
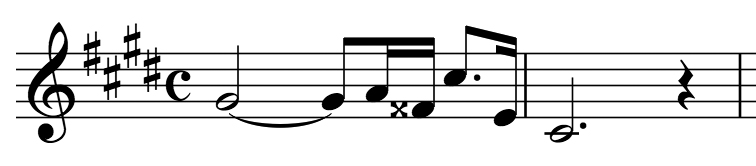
The leitmotif associated with Salome in Richard Strauss's opera Salome

Since Wagner, the use of leitmotifs has been taken up by many other composers. Richard Strauss used the device in many of his operas and several of his symphonic poems. Despite his sometimes acerbic comments on Wagner, Claude Debussy utilized leitmotifs in his opera Pelléas et Mélisande (1902). Arnold Schoenberg used a complex set of leitmotifs in his choral work Gurre-Lieder (completed 1911). Alban Berg's opera Wozzeck (1914–1922) also utilizes leitmotifs.

The leitmotif was a major feature of the opera The Immortal Hour by the English composer Rutland Boughton. His constantly recurrent, memorably tuneful leitmotifs contributed significantly to the widespread popularity of the opera. In Prokofiev's Peter and the Wolf (1936) each character or animal has its own leitmotif played on a particular instrument.

=== Critique of the leitmotif concept ===
The critic Theodor W. Adorno, in his book In Search of Wagner, written in the 1930s, expresses the opinion that the entire concept of the leitmotif is flawed. The motif cannot be both the bearer of expression and a musical "gesture", because that reduces emotional content to a mechanical process. He notes that "even in Wagner's own day the public made a crude link between the leitmotifs and the persons they characterised" because people's innate mental processes did not necessarily correspond with Wagner's subtle intentions or optimistic expectations. He continues:

"The degeneration of the Leitmotiv is implicit in this ... it leads directly to cinema music where the sole function of the leitmotif is to announce heroes or situations so as to allow the audience to orient itself more easily."

== Entertainment ==
- The movie M (1931) was one of the first to use a leitmotif. The main character, a child serial killer, whistles "In the Hall of the Mountain King" by Edvard Grieg and he is associated with this song throughout the movie.
- In the Jaws franchise, the main "shark" theme, composed by John Williams in 1975, stands out as a suspenseful motif that is a simple alternating pattern of two notes, E and F.
- In the first Star Wars film in 1977, John Williams used a large number of themes specifically associated with people and concepts, and he expanded upon this concept for the following films of the original trilogy. For example, a particular motif is attached to the presence of Darth Vader, another to the concept of the Death Star, and another to the concept of the Force. Williams later revisited this material for the prequel trilogy starting in 1999, and then again for the sequel trilogy starting in 2015, each time crafting new themes while incorporating the old. Other composers would utilize some of Williams' iconic leitmotifs in spin-off material.
- The Super Mario franchise by Nintendo is often associated with a variety of themes and recurring leitmotifs based on level design and characters, with similar leitmotifs found in overworld themes, the Underground theme, Bowser's theme, and ghost levels.
- In the 1989 film Batman, Danny Elfman composed the heroic theme for the titular character, which is also used in the later film.
- In Titanic (1997), composer James Horner used a number of recurring leitmotifs that are associated with the film's romance, tragedy and the disaster.
- John Williams composed the music for the first three Harry Potter movies starting in 2001, and leitmotifs are prominently utilized to represent specific characters, feelings, and locations, most notably the track entitled Hedwig's Theme. While Williams did not score the rest of the franchise, this theme would consistently return in the scores of later composers Patrick Doyle, Nicholas Hooper, Alexandre Desplat, and James Newton Howard as they worked on the final films and spin-offs.
- In The Lord of the Rings film series starting in 2001, composer Howard Shore prominently utilizes a vast amount of interconnecting leitmotifs to convey the ideas supporting specific characters, locations, and overall landscape of Middle-earth. His score is noteworthy because there is no singular "main theme" for the series, but a selection of several could hold this title, including the themes for the Fellowship, the Ring of Power, Lothlórien, the Shire, Isengard, Mordor, Rohan, and Gondor. Variations in these themes convey the changes that occur to the corresponding subjects throughout the trilogy. For the prequel Hobbit trilogy starting in 2012, Shore revisits some of these themes while introducing new leitmotifs for some of the new characters, and did so again for the show The Lord of the Rings: The Rings of Power alongside Bear McCreary.
- Composed by Hans Zimmer, Klaus Badelt, and Geoff Zanelli, the Pirates of the Caribbean film series consists of several motifs and themes associated with the protagonists, villains and moods starting in 2003. One prominent motif is "He's a Pirate", which is associated with pirates in general and the heroic action sequences they are involved in. Besides the general leitmotifs, specific characters such as Jack Sparrow, Davy Jones, Angelica, and Salazar each have their own unique motifs.
- The Dark Knight trilogy features several recurring themes and motifs for Batman, the villainous characters, and action scenes composed by Hans Zimmer and James Newton Howard starting in 2005.
- The original soundtrack of the 2009 video game Minecraft features a number of recognizable leitmotifs composed by C418, with its most prominent being the main melody featured in the soundtrack's title track, "Minecraft", which generally serves as a leitmotif for the overworld. The same melody appears throughout the soundtrack, such as in "Door" and "Mutation". Other tracks with popular leitmotifs include "Sweden", "Wet Hands", "Haggstrom", "Subwoofer Lullaby", "Mice on Venus", and "Danny".
- The MMORPG Final Fantasy XIV, particularly once Masayoshi Soken became lead composer, frequently uses specific musical tracks to shape the audience's emotional response to a scene or story. Some leitmotifs identify specific characters or factions, such as The Maker's Ruin representing the player character, the Warrior of Light, or Without Shadow, which represents the manipulative Ascians. Others provide emotional cues, such as the somber Canticle.
- While the Marvel Cinematic Universe has been criticized for its lack of iconic leitmotifs across its ever-expanding repertoire of films and shows, two recurring themes are prominently featured particularly towards the end of Phase Three: Alan Silvestri's theme for the Avengers team and Ludwig Göransson's theme for the Wakanda setting.
- Premiering in 2015, Hamilton: An American Musical uses several leitmotifs throughout to introduce characters and reinforce connections, composed and written primarily by Lin-Manuel Miranda. Almost all characters have a trademark leitmotif; for example, the way the name Alexander Hamilton is sung.
- In Toby Fox's soundtrack for his video game Undertale (2015), which has been well received by critics as part of the success of the game, thematic and character connections are frequently portrayed using leitmotifs. In particular, "Hopes and Dreams" and "SAVE the World", two of the game's final boss themes, bring back many important leitmotifs heard throughout the game. Fox has continued his usage of leitmotifs in his followup game Deltarune's soundtrack.

== See also ==
- Image song
- Motif (music)
- Motif (literature)
- Motif (visual arts)
- Ostinato
- Theme music
