= 0x10c =

Cancelled sandbox science fiction video game

0x10^{c}
- Developer: Mojang
- Designer: Markus Persson
- Artist: Jonatan Pöljö
- Composer: C418
- Platforms: Windows, OS X, Linux
- Release: Cancelled
- Genres: Sandbox, Space simulation
- Modes: Single-player, multiplayer

0x10^{c} (pronounced "ten to the c") is an unfinished sandbox science fiction video game previously under development by Mojang AB. It was announced on April 3, 2012, by Markus Persson, the game's lead designer. The game was indefinitely postponed because Persson found himself burned out and demotivated after so much early effort was spent into planning and designing the game, up until the point that it "sucked out any fun from the project". Persson then stated he will instead most likely continue to work on smaller projects for the rest of his life, rekindling the reason he loves programming games in the first place. The game was later cancelled.

The announced features included a fully working virtual computer, random encounters, an advanced economy system, and also single and multiplayer modes in a consistent universe, or "Multiverse". The game takes place in the year AD 281,474,976,712,644 (around 281.5 trillion years into the future) after people start waking up from "deep sleep" caused by a bug in deep sleep cells that were released in 1988. 0x is a prefix in many high-level languages used to indicate a hexadecimal literal. 10^{C} in hexadecimal is equivalent to 16^{12} in decimal, which equals 281,474,976,710,656, the number of years passed in the story since 1988.

== Gameplay ==
The list of features included engineering, space battles, seamless space-to-planet transitions, mining and trading, laser guns, and an open universe with both single-player and multiplayer variants.

0x10^{c} featured a working emulated 16-bit processor inside the game called the DCPU-16 that could be accessed through any of the monitors located in the game. The DCPU-16 could also load external programs and data using the required standards which would have allowed the community to make their own DCPU-16 emulators.

== Development ==
In December 2011, Markus Persson announced that he was going to be stepping down as the lead developer of Minecraft, and that he would be working on another project. Mojang CEO Carl Manneh said in an interview with Edge Online that Mojang was committed to supporting a new project that Persson was developing along with another game created by other developers in their company. After winning a special award from BAFTA in March 2012, Persson revealed that there were three different projects he was developing, but he had yet to come to a decision in terms of which one he was committed to working on. A few days later in an interview with PC Gamer magazine, Persson announced that he was working on a space-themed game that was inspired by the television show Firefly and the video game Elite.

The first details of this game were released in an April Fool's parody website called "Mars Effect", a play on Mass Effect and alluding to the lawsuit by Bethesda Softworks over trademark infringement. A few days later Persson announced that he had chosen a real name for the game and that he had made some progress on its development. Although it is not immediately obvious how to pronounce the game's name and a large variety of suggestions were proposed, Persson has said that he pronounces it as "ten to the see", but that "people can pronounce it however they want".

On October 13, 2012, the first video gameplay of 0x10^{c} was released by Persson on the game's website. On October 26, 2012, the first multiplayer test was uploaded to the website from Twitch.TV. In an April 2013 interview with Polygon, Persson stated that 0x10^{c} development was hit by creative road block and would be put on hold. Persson also said that the game is "ways off" and that he would be expanding the team, bringing on one other developer to "make sure the game gets made". On August 13, 2013, Persson confirmed in a live stream that 0x10^{c} was indefinitely shelved, adding that the game could potentially be made in the future, if another Mojang employee were interested in continuing its development.

=== Art ===
A mockup of what the game might look like made by Jonatan Pöljö, the game's artist

"The style is pixel art meets modern 3D. It's influenced by bright, vivid sci-fi, and real-world functional spaceship design to go with 0x10^{c}'s realistic tone," said Jonatan Pöljö, an artist on the game's team.

=== Soundtrack ===
On September 15, 2014, Daniel Rosenfeld (C418), who also composed the music for Minecraft, released the soundtrack for 0x10^{c} on his Bandcamp page, which consists of two tracks, "0x10c" and "0".

=== Pricing ===
0x10^{c} was expected to be the first Mojang game with a monthly fee for online play in multiplayer mode (but no recurring fee for single player mode). Persson said that this was because of the cost to "emulate all computers and physics even when players aren't logged in". It is unknown if there was to be a private multiplayer mode. It was revealed that the pricing would be similar to Minecraft, with alpha costing less than beta, and beta costing less than the full release.
