= Minecraft – Volume Alpha =

2011 soundtrack album by C418

Soundtrack album by C418
- Released: 4 March 2011
- Genres: Ambient; electronic
- Length: 58:52
- Label: Self-released

C418 chronology
Life Changing Moments Seem Minor in Pictures (2010)	Minecraft – Volume Alpha (2011)	72 Minutes of Fame (2011)

Minecraft soundtrack chronology
Minecraft – Volume Alpha (2011)	Minecraft – Volume Beta (2013)

Minecraft – Volume Alpha is the first soundtrack album by the German electronic musician Daniel "C418" Rosenfeld. Created for the 2011 video game Minecraft, it is the first of two albums by Rosenfeld to come from the game's soundtrack. It primarily consists of simplistic ambient music, though some tracks are more upbeat. The simplistic nature of the album's music was caused by the technical limitations of Minecraft's sound engine, which made earlier concepts unfeasible. Volume Alpha was released digitally in March 2011 as Rosenfeld's first commercial release, with record label Ghostly International releasing the album in vinyl record and CD format in 2015, and in cassette format in 2025.

Since release, Volume Alpha has been lauded by critics, who praised its usage in the game and its merits as a standalone ambient work. It has been considered to be a major part of Minecraft's popularity, and seven of its tracks are among the most streamed video game compositions on Spotify. Due to its association with Minecraft, some have considered it to be an influential album, as well as one of the best video game soundtracks ever made. In 2025, the soundtrack was selected to the National Recording Registry by the Library of Congress as being "culturally, historically, and/or aesthetically significant", making it the second piece of video game music to do so after the Super Mario Bros. theme. A second Minecraft soundtrack album, Minecraft – Volume Beta, was released in 2013. A third soundtrack album by Rosenfeld has been completed, but remains unreleased.

Rosenfeld described Volume Alpha as his most important work, and the success of the album led him to pursue music creation full-time. In 2022, the album experienced a resurgence in popularity and appeared on multiple charts, and was nominated for the Top Dance/Electronic Albums category at the Billboard Music Awards of 2022. In August 2023, the album's success led to Rosenfeld reaching number one on the Billboard Emerging Artists charts. In July 2026, Volume Alpha was certified Platinum by the RIAA, after "Sweden" received its own Gold certification in August 2023. Since then, two more tracks from the album, "Minecraft" and "Subwoofer Lullaby", have also been certified gold.

== Background ==
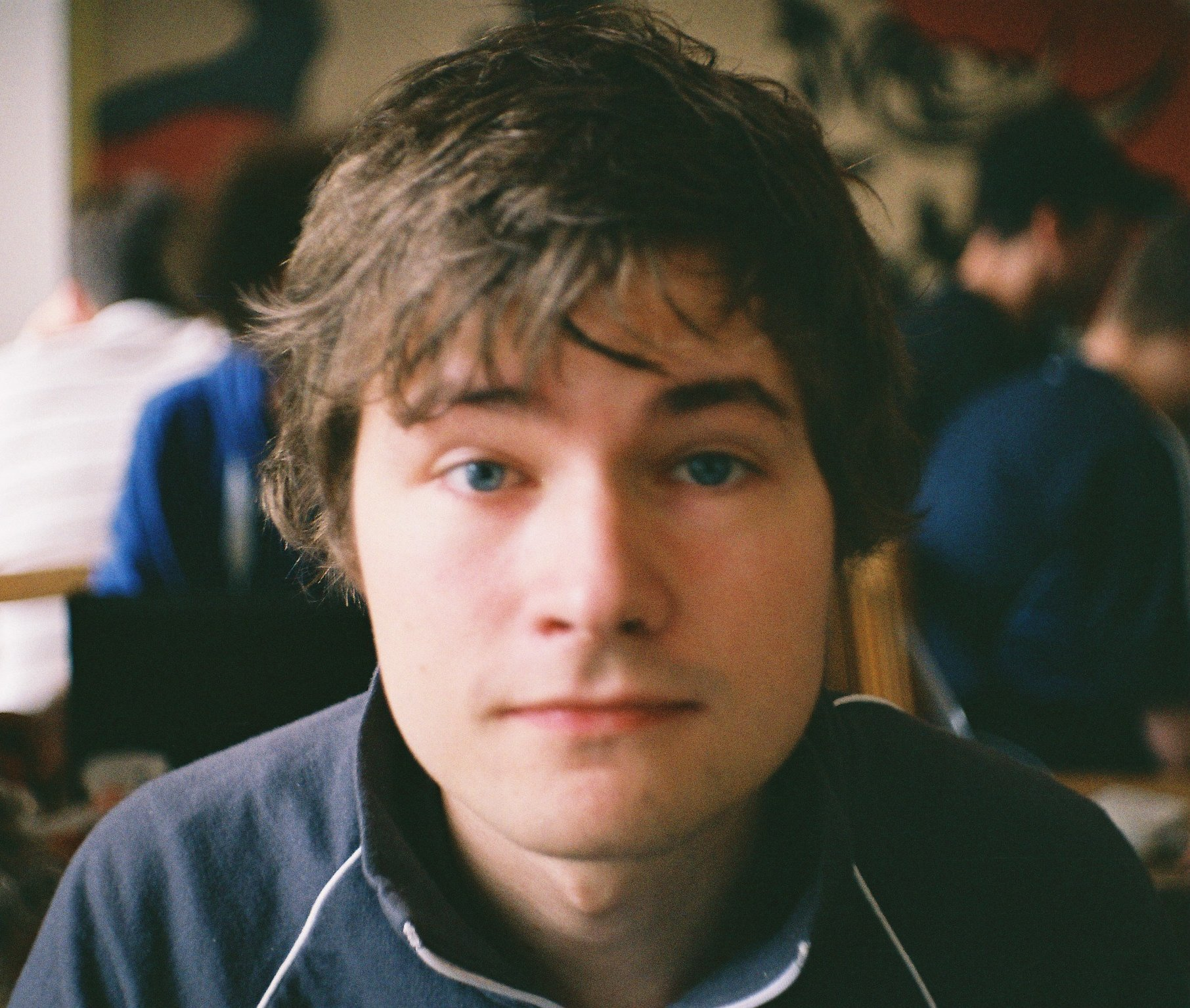
Daniel "C418" Rosenfeld, the composer of Volume Alpha, in 2011

Volume Alpha was the first album to come from the soundtrack for Minecraft, a 2011 sandbox video game created by Markus Persson. In the game, players can build anything they want in a randomly-generated world made out of "voxels", with no mandatory goals. As of October 2023, it is the best-selling video game of all time, having sold over 300 million units.

Prior to creating Volume Alpha, independent musician Daniel "C418" Rosenfeld was a small artist, mainly producing experimental albums inspired by Aphex Twin that he described as "making no sense". During the development of Minecraft, Persson met Rosenfeld through indie game development forum TIGSource, and the two became friends. When Persson showed the game to Rosenfeld, he requested that he become the game's sound designer. Rosenfeld accepted, and began work on the game's sound effects and music.

== Production and composition ==
Volume Alpha consists mainly of simplistic ambient and acoustic music that predominantly uses piano and strings. This design was primarily caused by the technical limitations of Minecraft's sound engine, which Rosenfeld said heavily limited the capabilities of the game's sound design. Originally, Rosenfeld wanted the game to include more "epic" music that would play during fights, music that would play depending on what type of biome the player was in, and music that would play exclusively in caves. These were all unfeasible due to how the game's sound engine worked, or because they were based on events that would've lasted too short for the music to be worthwhile. Instead, Rosenfeld opted to create more quiet, simplistic music. His approach was inspired by Dwarf Fortress (2006), where he viewed the game's lower graphical quality that would otherwise be a turn-off to be backed up by music that would encourage the player to continue playing.

Rosenfeld composed the soundtrack using Ableton Live, alongside other software and plugins. He also used synthesisers like the Moog Voyager. After every track was complete, Rosenfeld arranged the final renditions so that every track flowed naturally into the next, sometimes extending tracks to achieve this. He wanted Volume Alpha to be able to be listened to in one sitting and presented independently of Minecraft, while being interpreted as a single piece. In an interview with Vice, Rosenfeld stated that the album's track order originally had a narrative, though he had forgotten what it was. Despite Volume Alpha's track order, the music in Minecraft is played randomly, with no set moments where specific tracks play.

"Sweden"
A 21-second excerpt of "Sweden", considered the most popular song in the Minecraft soundtrack.

The first three tracks Rosenfeld made for Minecraft, added early in development, were "Minecraft", "Clark" and "Sweden", known in the game files as "Calm" 1, 2, and 3, respectively. After these tracks were added, Rosenfeld continued experimenting with the soundtrack's direction. He later concluded that the compositional style present in the "Calm" tracks was the most well received by players. He would then use this style as the basis for the composition of other tracks in Volume Alpha. This style does not apply to all tracks in the album, with compositions such as "Cat" and "Dog" being upbeat chiptune themes that use synthesisers.

== Release ==
Volume Alpha was released digitally on 4 March 2011 via Bandcamp as Rosenfeld's first commercial release. The commercial release of Volume Alpha contains several tracks exclusive to the album, ranging from those cut from the game (such as "Excuse") to compositions from Rosenfeld's previous albums (such as "Droopy Likes Ricochet"). The album's cover art is of a 3D version of a Minecraft block of grass. On 23 June 2015, a physical release of the album was announced by record label Ghostly International. Alongside the standard CD and LP releases, a limited-edition version that came in the form of a transparent vinyl was announced, with only 1,000 units being produced. These were released on 21 August 2015. Those who purchased the physical releases also received the album digitally. It has been reprinted since its initial release. On 15 April 2025, Ghostly announced that Volume Alpha would be released in cassette tape format starting 13 June, available alone or in a limited-edition box set with Volume Beta.

== Reception ==
Professional ratings
Review scores
Source	Rating
AllMusic	4/5 stars
Anthony Fantano	≥8/10
Mojo	4/5 stars
Sputnikmusic	4.0/5

Volume Alpha received positive reviews from critics. Several critics have highlighted the usage of Volume Alpha in Minecraft, believing its music to work alongside the aesthetic of the game; many commented on the album's significance and influence, and several praised the artistry. Luke Plunkett of Kotaku called Volume Alpha "as tranquil as a good night's sleep", and a great ambient album, the music critic Anthony Fantano found the work "gorgeous", and a staff writer of Sputnikmusic said it was an album you could "sit down to for a quick listen, only to emerge, staggering and numb, 2 hours later, confused but knowing that time wasn't wasted".

The album's artistry was the subject of critical commentary. AllMusic's Andy Kellman found Volume Alpha to be a good demonstration of Rosenfeld's work, one that made it "easy to hear [...] why he has been compared" to influential composers such as Erik Satie and Brian Eno. Kellman believed that the album had good track variety, writing "none of the recurring elements are pronounced or simple enough to become fatiguing with repeated play". Original Sound Version's Richard McDonald described the similarities between most tracks in the album as beneficial to its presentation when it came to "providing an overall style while keeping each track unique", while also finding the composition of each track to be a style that he "couldn't imagine the game without". Sputnikmusic praised the album's role as a soundtrack and its consistency between compositions. They said that the abundance of piano-centric compositions accompanied with synths created a "signature" for Rosenfeld; they praised this as key to the mood and immersion though wished there was more track variety.

Critics highlighted the album's significance and influence. Stephen Worthy of Mojo believed that the album diverted expectations in comparison to other soundtracks behind popular video games, which he found to typically be large scale orchestras instead of vignettes. Worthy described Volume Alpha as one of the most influential albums of recent times due to Minecraft's widespread popularity, as well as one of the "loveliest". Sputnikmusic described it as one of the best ambient and electronic albums of 2011, and Fantano named it "easily" one of the best video game soundtracks of all time. Original Sound Version's McDonald believed that Volume Alpha was "one of the most stand-out game soundtracks" of the 21st century, and one that was an "example of beautiful, elegant, and strongly emotional composition that transcends the game music genre into something much more".

Critics commented on the album's context within the game. Original Sound Version's McDonald highlighted the album's usage in Minecraft as leading to "very strong emotions that few games manage to master, or even hint at", which he viewed as consequentially being heavily nostalgic. AllMusic's Kellman wrote Volume Alpha to be one of "many immersive aspects" of Minecraft, Fantano said it was integral in making Minecraft's gameplay enjoyable, and Digital Trends believed that Minecraft might not have been as successful as it was if it were not for the work of Rosenfeld, including Volume Alpha. In the book Four Ways of Hearing Video Game Music, Michiel Kamp wrote that the sandbox nature of Minecraft also applied to its music, believing the randomness of how the soundtrack is presented would lead to what he viewed as the game creating unique, personalized moments that weren't intentional.

== Legacy ==
Following the release of Volume Alpha, Rosenfeld continued to create music for Minecraft, with the second soundtrack album, Minecraft – Volume Beta, releasing in 2013. He also composed the score for the 2012 documentary film Minecraft: The Story of Mojang. Afterwards, Rosenfeld contributed music to console versions of Minecraft in 2014, and three more standalone tracks to the full game in 2018. In 2015, Rosenfeld told Fact Magazine that a third soundtrack album would be released. In 2017, Rosenfeld said that while he was "still far from done" at that point, he had composed more music for the third album than the total of Volume Alpha and Beta combined. When asked about the third album in a 2021 interview with Anthony Fantano, Rosenfeld commented, "I have something—I consider it finished—but things have become complicated, especially as Minecraft is now a big property, so I don't know". Since the release of Volume Beta, other artists besides Rosenfeld have created music for the game, such as Celeste (2018) composer Lena Raine. Rosenfeld said in 2025 that he was glad that his time with Minecraft was "chosen for me that it's done" so he could focus on a normal career—Rosenfeld made note of "a lot of ruminations going on" about whether he would release a work for Minecraft again, and said that he would be content if he does not complete further work for the game.

Staff teams of several news outlets have considered the Minecraft soundtrack, including Volume Alpha, to be among the best video game soundtracks of all time. These include the editorial teams of NME, Digital Trends, GamesRadar+, and VG247. In 2020, Fantano ranked the Minecraft soundtrack, including Volume Alpha, 138th in his list of the 200 best albums from the 2010s. Volume Alpha has been found to be a popular album to listen to while studying or working due to its calm nature. According to research done by Unikrn in April 2021, "Sweden" was the most streamed work from the Minecraft soundtrack on Spotify and the most streamed video game composition on the service, with over 77 million plays. Alongside "Sweden", six other tracks from Volume Alpha were in the top 25 on Spotify at the time, these being "Minecraft" (2), "Subwoofer Lullaby" (7), "Wet Hands" (8), "Key" (18), "Haggstrom" (23), and "Mice on Venus" (24). At the time, the plays for these seven works combined were estimated to be 225 million. Unikrn estimated that the streaming of Volume Alpha could have earned Rosenfeld $900,000, with up to a third of that being from "Sweden". Since then, "Sweden" has been surpassed in plays by "Megalovania", a song from the Undertale Soundtrack, but remained in second place with about 120 million plays by March 2023. Three individual tracks from Volume Alpha have been certified gold by the RIAA, each selling 500,000 confirmed units: "Sweden" on 22 August 2023, and "Minecraft" and "Subwoofer Lullaby" on February 18, 2025.

Rosenfeld considers the album to be his most important and successful work, and the one that helped him create his career as an independent music artist. In 2011, Rosenfeld told Kotaku that the success of his Minecraft music allowed him to pursue making music full-time rather than part-time. According to Fact Magazine, the success of Minecraft makes Rosenfeld one of the best selling artists by proxy. Rosenfeld would go on to co-found the independent game studio Ivy Road, for which he composed the music to their first game, Wanderstop. Volume Alpha experienced a resurgence in popularity in 2022 and 2023, appearing on multiple global charts and being nominated for Top Dance/Electronic Album at the Billboard Music Awards of 2022, though it lost to Illenium's Fallen Embers. In 2023, the album led to Rosenfeld reaching #1 on the Billboard Emerging Artists chart. On 14 December 2023, Volume Alpha was certified gold by the RIAA, nearly four months after the individual certification of "Sweden". In April 2025, the Library of Congress added the soundtrack to the National Recording Registry of "culturally, historically, or aesthetically significant recordings". Until 2026, Volume Alpha was only the second piece of video game music to be inducted after the Super Mario Bros. theme.

== Track listing ==
Digital download and CD
No.	Title	Length
1.	"Key"	1:05
2.	"Door"	1:51
3.	"Subwoofer Lullaby"	3:28
4.	"Death"	0:42
5.	"Living Mice"	2:57
6.	"Moog City"	2:40
7.	"Haggstrom"	3:24
8.	"Minecraft"	4:14
9.	"Oxygène"	1:05
10.	"Équinoxe"	1:54
11.	"Mice on Venus"	4:41
12.	"Dry Hands"	1:08
13.	"Wet Hands"	1:30
14.	"Clark"	3:11
15.	"Chris"	1:27
16.	"Thirteen"	2:56
17.	"Excuse"	2:04
18.	"Sweden"	3:35
19.	"Cat"	3:06
20.	"Dog"	2:25
21.	"Danny"	4:14
22.	"Beginning"	1:42
23.	"Droopy Likes Ricochet"	1:36
24.	"Droopy Likes Your Face"	1:57
Total length:		58:52

LP (Side A)
No.	Title	Length
1.	"Subwoofer Lullaby"	3:28
2.	"Living Mice"	2:57
3.	"Moog City"	2:40
4.	"Haggstrom"	3:24
5.	"Minecraft"	4:14
6.	"Clark"	3:11
Total length:		19:54

LP (Side B)
No.	Title	Length
1.	"Mice on Venus"	4:41
2.	"Dry Hands"	1:08
3.	"Wet Hands"	1:30
4.	"Sweden"	3:35
5.	"Cat"	3:06
6.	"Danny"	4:14
Total length:		18:14 38:08

== Accolades ==
List of awards and nominations for Minecraft – Volume Alpha
Awards	Year	Category	Result	Ref.
Billboard Music Awards	2021	Top Dance/Electronic Album	Nominated	

== Charts ==
=== Weekly charts ===
Weekly chart performance for Minecraft – Volume Alpha
Chart (2022–2026)	Peak position
Australian Albums (ARIA)	26
Belgian Albums (Ultratop Flanders)	67
Belgian Albums (Ultratop Wallonia)	154
Dutch Albums (Album Top 100)	40
German Albums (Offizielle Top 100)	43
New Zealand Albums (RMNZ)	31
Norwegian Physical Albums (IFPI Norge)	1
Scottish Albums (Official Charts)	34
Swedish Physical Albums (Sverigetopplistan)	18
Swiss Albums (Schweizer Hitparade)	63
UK Albums Sales (Official Charts)	34
UK Independent Albums (Official Charts)	17
UK Soundtrack Albums (Official Charts)	1
US Heatseekers Albums (Billboard)	16
US Independent Albums (Billboard)	35
US Soundtrack Albums (Billboard)	4
US Top Album Sales (Billboard)	27
US Top Dance Albums (Billboard)	5

=== Year-end charts ===
2023 year-end chart performance for Minecraft – Volume Alpha
Chart (2023)	Position
US Soundtrack Albums (Billboard)	25
US Top Dance Albums (Billboard)	9

2024 year-end chart performance for Minecraft – Volume Alpha
Chart (2024)	Position
US Soundtrack Albums (Billboard)	20
US Top Dance Albums (Billboard)	11

2025 year-end chart performance for Minecraft – Volume Alpha
Chart (2025)	Position
US Soundtrack Albums (Billboard)	14
US Top Dance Albums (Billboard)	8

== Certifications ==
Certifications for Minecraft – Volume Alpha
Region	Certification	Certified units/sales
United States (RIAA)	Platinum	1,000,000^{‡}
^{‡} Sales+streaming figures based on certification alone.
