= List of video game soundtracks listed among the best =

This is a list of video game soundtracks that multiple publications, such as video game journalism and music journalism publications, have considered to be among the best of all time. The game soundtracks listed here are included on at least three separate "best/greatest of all time" lists from different publications (inclusive of all time periods and platforms). Achievements, such as certifications or Grammy nominations, are separately noted.

== List ==
Video game soundtracks considered the best
Year	Game	Lead composer(s)	Notes	Ref.
1985	Super Mario Bros.	Koji Kondo	The Super Mario Bros. theme was the first musical piece from a video game to be inducted into the Library of Congress's National Recording Registry.	(Note: Super Mario Bros.:)
1988	Mega Man 2	Takashi Tateishi		(Note: Mega Man 2:)
1989	Tetris	Hirokazu Tanaka	Game Boy version	(Note: Tetris:)
1991	Street Fighter II	Yoko Shimomura		(Note: Street Fighter II:)
1991	Street Fighter II	Isao Abe		(Note: Street Fighter II:)
1992	Streets of Rage 2 (soundtrack)	Yuzo Koshiro		(Note: Streets of Rage 2:)
1992	Streets of Rage 2 (soundtrack)	Motohiro Kawashima		(Note: Streets of Rage 2:)
1993	Doom	Bobby Prince	Inducted into the National Recording Registry in 2026	(Note: Doom (1993):)
1994	EarthBound (soundtrack)	Keiichi Suzuki		(Note: EarthBound:)
1994	EarthBound (soundtrack)	Hirokazu Tanaka		(Note: EarthBound:)
1994	Final Fantasy VI (soundtrack)	Nobuo Uematsu		(Note: Final Fantasy VI:)
1994	Sonic the Hedgehog 3	Brad Buxer		(Note: Sonic the Hedgehog 3:)
1994	Sonic the Hedgehog 3	Sega Sound Team		(Note: Sonic the Hedgehog 3:)
1994	Super Metroid	Kenji Yamamoto		(Note: Super Metroid:)
1994	Super Metroid	Minako Hamano		(Note: Super Metroid:)
1995	Chrono Trigger (soundtrack)	Yasunori Mitsuda		(Note: Chrono Trigger:)
1995	Chrono Trigger (soundtrack)	Nobuo Uematsu		(Note: Chrono Trigger:)
1995	Donkey Kong Country 2	David Wise		(Note: Donkey Kong Country 2:)
1996	PaRappa the Rapper	Masaya Matsuura		(Note: PaRappa the Rapper:)
1996	PaRappa the Rapper	Yoshihisa Suzuki		(Note: PaRappa the Rapper:)
1996	Super Mario 64	Koji Kondo		(Note: Super Mario 64:)
1997	Castlevania: Symphony of the Night	Michiru Yamane		(Note: Castlevania: Symphony of the Night:)
1997	Final Fantasy VII (soundtrack)	Nobuo Uematsu		(Note: Final Fantasy VII:)
1998	Grim Fandango (soundtrack)	Peter McConnell		(Note: Grim Fandango:)
1998	The Legend of Zelda: Ocarina of Time	Koji Kondo		(Note: The Legend of Zelda: Ocarina of Time:)
2000	Jet Set Radio	Hideki Naganuma		(Note: Jet Set Radio:)
2001	Halo: Combat Evolved (soundtrack)	Martin O'Donnell		(Note: Halo: Combat Evolved:)
2001	Halo: Combat Evolved (soundtrack)	Michael Salvatori		(Note: Halo: Combat Evolved:)
2001	Phoenix Wright: Ace Attorney (soundtrack)	Masakazu Sugimori		(Note: Phoenix Wright: Ace Attorney:)
2001	Silent Hill 2	Akira Yamaoka		(Note: Silent Hill 2:)
2002	Grand Theft Auto: Vice City	Various		(Note: Grand Theft Auto: Vice City:)
2004	Katamari Damacy (soundtrack)	Yuu Miyake		(Note: Katamari Damacy:)
2005	Shadow of the Colossus	Kow Otani		(Note: Shadow of the Colossus:)
2007	Portal	Kelly Bailey		(Note: Portal:)
2007	Portal	Mike Morasky		(Note: Portal:)
2007	Portal	Jonathan Coulton	Composed the ending song "Still Alive"	(Note: Portal:)
2010	Red Dead Redemption (soundtrack)	Bill Elm		(Note: Red Dead Redemption:)
2010	Red Dead Redemption (soundtrack)	Woody Jackson		(Note: Red Dead Redemption:)
2011	Bastion	Darren Korb		(Note: Bastion:)
2011	The Elder Scrolls V: Skyrim (soundtrack)	Jeremy Soule		(Note: The Elder Scrolls V: Skyrim:)
2011	Minecraft (soundtrack)	C418	Volume Alpha (and three songs) (Note: The Minecraft songs labeled Certified Gold are "Sweden" in 2023, and "Minecraft" and "Subwoofer Lullaby" in 2025. Volume Alpha was Certified Gold in 2023.) labeled Gold by the RIAA, nominated for Top Dance/Electronic Album at the 2022 Billboard Music Awards, and inducted into the National Recording Registry in 2025	(Note: Minecraft:)
2012	Hotline Miami	Various		(Note: Hotline Miami:)
2012	Journey	Austin Wintory	Nominated for the Grammy Award for Best Score Soundtrack for Visual Media	(Note: Journey:)
2013	BioShock Infinite	Garry Schyman		(Note: BioShock Infinite:)
2014	Transistor	Darren Korb		(Note: Transistor:)
2015	Crypt of the NecroDancer	Danny Baranowsky		(Note: Crypt of the NecroDancer:)
2015	Everybody's Gone to the Rapture	Jessica Curry		(Note: Everybody's Gone to the Rapture:)
2015	Undertale (soundtrack)	Toby Fox	As of 2025, "Megalovania" has the most listens on Spotify of any video game song.	(Note: Undertale:)
2015	The Witcher 3: Wild Hunt	Marcin Przybyłowicz		(Note: The Witcher 3: Wild Hunt:)
2015	The Witcher 3: Wild Hunt	Mikolai Stroinski		(Note: The Witcher 3: Wild Hunt:)
2016	Doom	Mick Gordon		(Note: Doom (2016):)
2016	Persona 5	Shoji Meguro		(Note: Persona 5:)
2017	Cuphead	Kristofer Maddigan		(Note: Cuphead:)
2017	Hollow Knight (soundtrack)	Christopher Larkin		(Note: Hollow Knight:)
2017	Nier: Automata (soundtrack)	Keiichi Okabe		(Note: Nier: Automata:)
2017	Nier: Automata (soundtrack)	Keigo Hoashi		(Note: Nier: Automata:)
2018	Celeste	Lena Raine		(Note: Celeste:)
2018	God of War	Bear McCreary		(Note: God of War:)
2018	Red Dead Redemption 2 (soundtrack)	Woody Jackson		(Note: Red Dead Redemption 2:)
2019	Sayonara Wild Hearts	Daniel Olsén		(Note: Sayonara Wild Hearts:)
2019	Sayonara Wild Hearts	Jonathan Eng		(Note: Sayonara Wild Hearts:)
2020	Hades	Darren Korb		(Note: Hades:)

== Publications ==
The reference numbers in the notes section show which of the 21 selected publications list the game.

- Canaltech – 2022
- Clash – 2013
- Classic FM – 2023
- CBR – 2026
- Digital Trends – 2021
- Esquire India – 2026
- Fact – 2015
- Game Rant – 2023
- GameSpot – 2000, 2021
- GamesRadar+ – 2020, 2025
- The Mary Sue – 2022
- Metal Hammer – 2023
- Mixdown – 2023
- NME – 2015
- Paste – 2020
- PCMag – 2022
- Red Bull – 2018
- Rolling Stone – 2013, 2024
- Spin – 2024
- Tom's Guide – 2018
- Universo Online – 2021
- USA Today – 2023
- VG247 – 2023
- X-Play – 2007

== See also ==
- List of video games listed among the best
- List of video game soundtracks released on vinyl

== Notes ==
The reference numbers show which publications include the game's soundtrack.
