= C418 =

German composer (born 1989)

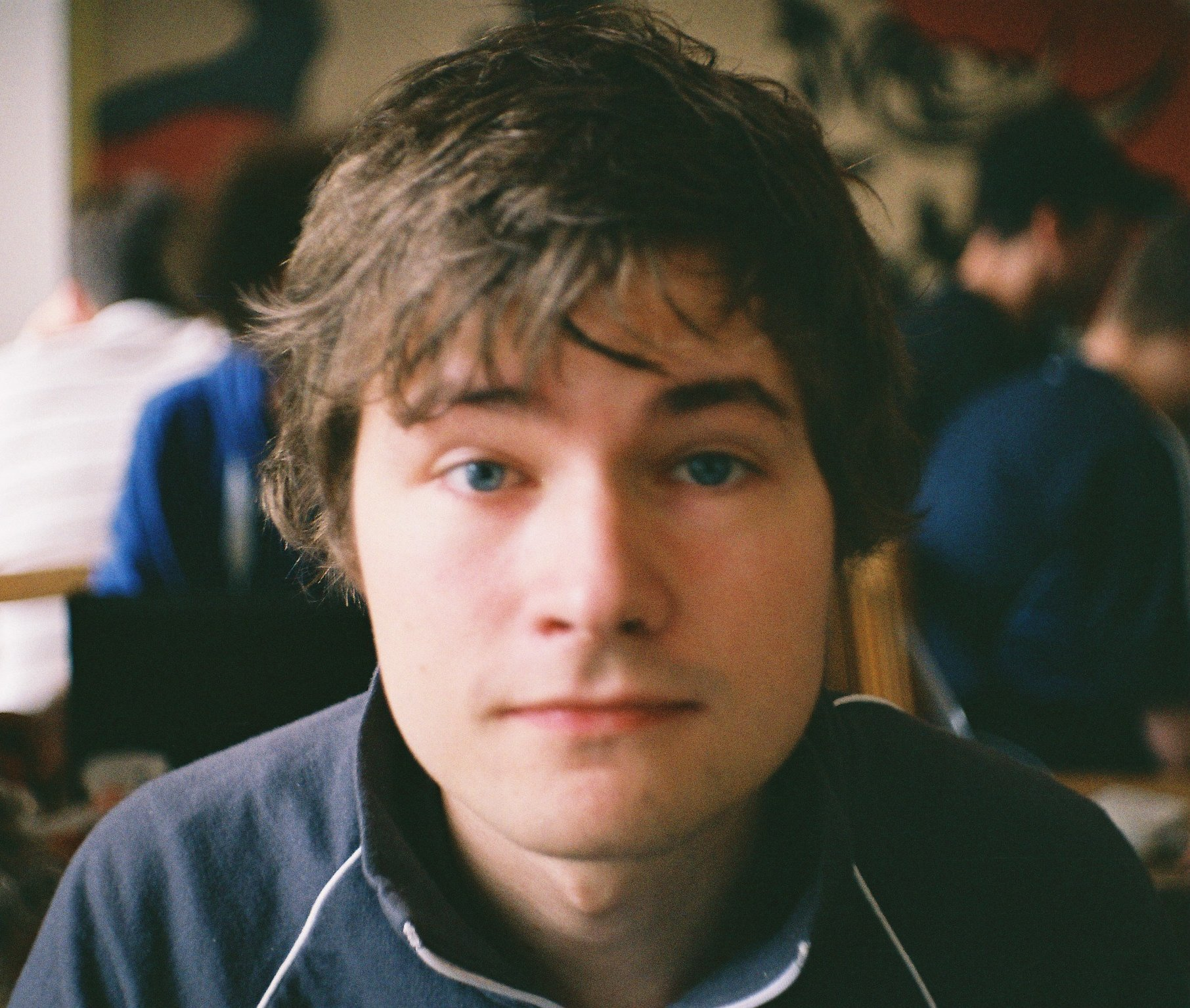
- C418 in 2011

Background information
- Born: Daniel Rosenfeld; 9 May 1989 (age 37); Karl-Marx-Stadt, East Germany (now Chemnitz, Germany)
- Genres: Ambient; minimal house; Electronic; Orchestral
- Occupations: Composer; record producer
- Works: Discography
- Years active: 2006–present
- Labels: Ghostly International; Driftless Recordings
- Member of: Co-founder of Ivy Road (defunct)
- Spouse: Miruna Aviva Pinchas (m. 2021)
- Website: c418.org

Daniel Rosenfeld (born 9 May 1989), known professionally as C418 (pronounced "see four eighteen"), is a German composer and record producer. Known for his minimalistic ambient work, he rose to fame as the original composer and sound designer for the 2011 sandbox video game Minecraft. Acclaimed for its nostalgic value and relaxing quality, his music for the game is considered one of the greatest video game soundtracks ever composed.

Rosenfeld was first introduced to music production by his brother Harry, and took it up as a hobby. He met game developer Markus Persson on the online forum TIGSource, and became the sound designer and composer for Persson's project Minecraft. Rosenfeld released the soundtrack albums Volume Alpha (2011) and Volume Beta (2013) for the game, and scored the documentary Minecraft: The Story of Mojang with the album One (2012). He released the album 148 (2015), wrote and produced the theme for Beyond Stranger Things, and released Dief (both 2017).

While a third Minecraft album has not emerged, Rosenfeld released the studio album Excursions (2018) and scored the Steam release of Cookie Clicker (2021). Rosenfeld co-founded the independent video game studio Ivy Road with developers Davey Wreden and Karla Zimonja. He composed the soundtrack for their first game, Wanderstop (2025). In August 2023, he was ranked at #1 on Billboard magazine's emerging artists chart.

== Early life and family ==
Rosenfeld was born in East Germany in 1989. His father was a goldsmith, and his family had a musical background before they pursued other careers. He learned to create music on early versions of Schism Tracker (a popular clone of Impulse Tracker) and Ableton Live in the early 2000s, both rudimentary tools at the time. It was his brother, Harry Rosenfeld, who introduced him to music composition through Ableton, commenting that "even an idiot" can successfully create music with it. His brother was also known as C818, from which he chose the name C418, claiming that the name is "really cryptic and doesn't actually mean anything." Rosenfeld has also stated that he was "mediocre at school," but learning basic music theory and English came easy to him.

== Music career ==
=== 2002–2008: Career beginnings ===
Rosenfeld started releasing music on Bandcamp after Danny Baranowsky suggested releasing his music on the site. In 2007, Rosenfeld started a blog known as "Blödsinn am Mittwoch" (English: "Silliness on Wednesday"), where he posted a new song every week. This was around the same time when he became interested in game development and audio, which resulted in him joining the indie game development forum TIGSource, where he became involved with numerous smaller games and game developers. Among them, Rosenfeld unofficially released the soundtracks of Zombie Dog in Crazyland and Mubbly Tower on an old blog. Later, Rosenfeld started making albums and releasing them on his blog and Bandcamp, as a hobby.

His first release was the 2007 EP BPS, and shortly thereafter, in 2008, he challenged himself to make a studio album as quickly as possible, for fun, prioritizing quantity over quality. The Whatever Director's Cut was released on his blog as BAM #30 and on his Bandcamp, where it was available until it was removed in 2013, due to Rosenfeld's dislike of the album.

Also in 2008, Rosenfeld released Mixes, a 25-minute medley containing remixes of songs previously posted on the blog. Also released were the EP Sine and his second studio album, Zweitonegoismus, which expressed his discontent with working in an assembly line factory. Rosenfeld showed the album to his co-worker prior to releasing it, prompting them to ask "why the hell [he was] still working there".

=== 2009–2013: Minecraft, becoming a freelance composer, and One ===
In early 2009, Rosenfeld began collaborating with Minecraft creator Markus "Notch" Persson through TIGSource. Rosenfeld was responsible for the sound effects and music in Persson's work-in-progress video game Minecraft. The sound engine in the still early Java game was not very powerful, so Rosenfeld had to be creative in his approach to creating sound effects and music.

The sixth soundtrack from circle named depado

In January 2010, Rosenfeld's fourth studio album A Cobblers Tee Thug, a collaborative work with his friend Sohnemann was released. The album was the result of a challenge the two musicians had set themselves to make a full-length LP in the short time they spent together over the New Year. In March 2010, Rosenfeld released the album circle, originally created in 2008 and intended as the soundtrack for an unpublished indie game bearing the same name, created by an unknown developer. In August of that same year, Rosenfeld released Life Changing Moments Seem Minor in Pictures. The album was recorded while Rosenfeld was still residing within Germany, and at the time of releasing the album he had been requested to work for military services after quitting his job, which he managed to avoid by performing other labour. The album also contains parts of the original soundtrack to Ezo, a game Rosenfeld independently developed for Ludum Dare.

In 2011, two compilation albums, Little Things and Seven Years of Server Data, were released on Bandcamp for free. Both albums contained various unused or unfinished tracks, some made for game projects that had never come to fruition.

In 2011 a series of compilation albums with songs from various projects were released on Bandcamp for free, including Little Things, I Forgot Something, Didn't I. (a B-side to 72 Minutes of Fame), and Seven Years of Server Data.

While still working on Minecraft as a freelance artist, Rosenfeld was not on staff at Mojang, the company behind Minecraft. Rosenfeld still owns the rights to all his music in the game, and has released two albums featuring songs from the Minecraft soundtrack. The first soundtrack, Minecraft – Volume Alpha, was digitally released on 4 March 2011 on his Bandcamp page. The Guardian has compared his compositions to those of Brian Eno and Erik Satie because of their minimalistic, ambient quality.

Later that year, when Minecraft became available to the general public as an early access title, it rapidly became popular. Rosenfeld, who up until that point had worked at an assembly line for a company in Stollberg, could now pursue music as his primary source of income. This inspired his 2011 studio album, 72 Minutes of Fame, the content of which mostly revolves around this lifestyle-defining moment in Rosenfeld's life. This album was the first of Rosenfeld's works to have a physical release, and was released on Bandcamp on 19 July 2011, preceded by one day by its B-side, I forgot something, didn't I.

Almost half a year later, 2 Player Productions began production on a documentary of the development of Minecraft, titled Minecraft: The Story of Mojang. Rosenfeld was requested to create the soundtrack for this documentary, which was ultimately released as his 2012 album, One. Vice called it a "gleeful and unobtrusive collection of short melodic instrumentals that skip around daintily like cute little bashful kittens, but with a dark self-deprecating humour lurking beneath".

=== 2013–2016: Minecraft - Volume Beta, 0x10^{c}, and 148 ===
On 9 November 2013, Rosenfeld released the second album of the official soundtrack for Minecraft, titled Minecraft – Volume Beta. Many of the new songs were made for features of the game that were not present when the first volume was produced; i.e. the Nether or the End. In 2020, the soundtrack was released in physical format with Ghostly International and reprints of the Minecraft - Volume Alpha physical releases were also released. The Volume Beta releases consisted of a double CD edition of the album, a vinyl record which came in black and a red "fire" splatter color, and a limited edition of the vinyl pressed on a magenta translucent material which was at first exclusive to Europe but was later re-pressed internationally. Additionally, on 13 June 2025 Ghostly International released both Minecraft – Volume Alpha and Minecraft – Volume Beta on cassette tape, separately and as a bundle.

After the success of Minecraft, Persson began work on a new game, titled 0x10^{c}, for which Rosenfeld had intended to compose the soundtrack. The game was never released, however, with Persson halting production indefinitely in August 2013. In 2014, Rosenfeld released an EP containing the music made for 0x10^{c}. It was released digitally with little publicity; Rosenfeld only sent out a tweet stating that it was available.

In 2015, Rosenfeld released 148, which, much like 72 Minutes of Fame, carried a significant amount of personal content, albeit slightly more hidden under lyrics and effects. Later that year, Minecraft - Volume Alpha soundtrack was released in physical form by Ghostly International. This release consisted of a regular CD edition of the album, a vinyl edition which came with a code for a digital copy of the album, and a limited edition of the album pressed on green translucent vinyl.

=== 2016–2021: Dief, unreleased third Minecraft album, and Excursions ===
In a 2011 Reddit AmA, Rosenfeld stated his plans to create a third, unnamed soundtrack album to Minecraft, after the release of Minecraft – Volume Beta. Rosenfeld first revealed development of the album in a 2015 interview with Fact Magazine, commenting, "I'll still work on Minecraft, so there'll probably be another album. In fact, it's gonna be more ambient than the others, just as an experiment." He also noted listeners' own applications of his previous works, remarking, "I'm interested in seeing how people use music as a sleep aid, so I think on the next album I might put a bonus track on there that's just 15 minutes of complete ambience and see what people think." Rosenfeld again expressed interest in composing an ambient bonus track for his third album in a tweet posted in December of that year.

Rosenfeld released 2 Years of Failure in 2016, a Bandcamp exclusive compilation album of music made for failed projects or songs that could not fit anywhere else. Several songs in this album were made for an abandoned game Rosenfeld described as having a "...Japanese puzzle exchange..." vibe. This album also contains the original soundtrack for Crayon Physics. Most notably, this album contains C418's remix of the Stranger Things theme song, which had staggering popularity in 2018. It was the most played song on Rosenfeld's personal SoundCloud page until it was removed along with several other tracks due to a lapsed SoundCloud Pro subscription. Netflix would go on to use his version as the theme music for Beyond Stranger Things.

On 13 March 2017, the EP Dief was released to Rosenfeld's Bandcamp. The EP was created and used as a soundtrack for an informative talk given at the Game Developers Conference 2017 by Teddy Dief, and was created in less than two weeks.

In a 2017 tweet, the musician confirmed the existence of a third Minecraft album, and said that it was set for future release, but that work on it at that point was "still far from done". Rosenfeld additionally stated that the record would be longer than the previous two albums combined, which in total clocks in at over 3 hours and 18 minutes. Rosenfeld additionally reiterated on Twitter that the third album would not be called "Minecraft – Volume Gamma", deviating from the Greek Alphabet naming convention used in the previous two Minecraft albums he composed. Of the work Rosenfeld did on the third volume, he commented, "When I started making a third minecraft album, I didn't expect it to have this much work involved. I think I'm seeing the end of the tunnel?"

On 16 July 2018, three new songs from C418 were added to the game for "Update Aquatic". It marked the first new contributions from Rosenfeld since Minecraft - Volume Beta in 2013. The three tracks were released digitally from August – "Dragon Fish" on 9 August, "Shuniji" on 10 November, and "Axolotl" on 12 December 2018. Rosenfeld was asked by Mojang to create music with "slow beats" for the aquatic music, in a style similar to the music of Donkey Kong, though after he first wrote the songs, Mojang wanted more of the "Donkey Kong" aspect. Rosenfeld slowed the music down and added hi-hats, and Mojang were satisfied.

On 20 July 2018, Rosenfeld announced a studio album, Excursions, with the release of its lead single, "Beton". Its second single, "Thunderbird", was released on 20 August 2018. The album was released on 7 September 2018. Excursions was released on CD and a limited vinyl LP by Driftless Recordings in January 2019 and reprinted in 2021 for CD and Vinyl.

In 2020, after the announcement of the addition of Steve to the game, Rosenfeld's work was not included in Super Smash Bros. Ultimate for various undisclosed reasons, though one explanation given was it being too calm for fighting.

In May 2021, Rosenfeld released Branching Out. The EP, exclusive to SoundCloud, is the soundtrack to Branch, a video conferencing software by Dayton Mills. On 8 January 2021, Rosenfeld was asked in an interview with Anthony Fantano whether or not the third volume of the Minecraft soundtrack was still in production. Rosenfeld responded, saying, "I have something—I consider it finished—but things have become complicated, especially as Minecraft is now a big property, so I don't know." Later that year, he would elaborate on his Discord server, saying:

"I still want to do stuff for Minecraft, but I've never managed to get to an agreement with the big guys. I have a lot of music but only time will tell how we will get it out. It will involve at least 20 lawyers."

=== 2021–2025: Cookie Clicker and Wanderstop ===
On 16 June 2021, Rosenfeld announced on Twitter that his album from 11 years prior, Life Changing Moments Seem Minor in Pictures, would be remastered and released onto major streaming platforms. The album prior to the re-release was only available on Bandcamp. In July 2021, Rosenfeld, along with Davey Wreden, Karla Zimonja and Annapurna Interactive announced the launch of Ivy Road, a game studio founded by the trio. The studio revealed they were working on a then-untitled game, which Rosenfeld composed the music for. Following the announcement of the launch of Ivy Road, in August 2021 Rosenfeld announced that he had worked on a soundtrack for the Steam release of the 2013 game Cookie Clicker. In September 2021, Rosenfeld released the soundtrack as an EP. On 13 March 2022, Rosenfeld performed a DJ set with Anamanaguchi for their Scott Pilgrim vs. The World: The Game Soundtrack tour. In August 2022, Northway Games released I Was a Teenage Exocolonist. Rosenfeld and other fellow musical artists collaborated in composing the soundtrack to the game. His contribution was the piece "Quiet."

In June 2024, Annapurna and Ivy Road announced their game Wanderstop, a tea brewing simulator. It released on 11 March 2025. On 11 December 2024, Rosenfeld released the game's title track, "Wanderstop." A second track, "Endless Velocity," was released on 19 February 2025. One week before the expected release of the game, on 4 March 2025, Rosenfeld released a third song from the soundtrack, "Pumpkin." On 11 March 2025, Rosenfeld published the soundtrack to Wanderstop. He was involved with "anything that had to do with audio". He then confessed in an interview to suffering burnout from the creation of the album, saying that "putting the pen down is really, really hard, and stopping to smell the roses can be extremely difficult for me, especially as a person with ADHD". Rosenfeld recognized the irony of his working without taking breaks, considering that the central narrative of the game concerned the subject of overworking. In 2025, the United States Library of Congress added Rosenfeld's Minecraft – Volume Alpha soundtrack album to the National Recording Registry, listing it as "culturally, historically, or aesthetically significant".

== Personal life and views ==
Rosenfeld lives in Austin, Texas and has a Pembroke Welsh Corgi named Finneas. He is married to Miruna Aviva Pinchas. He is a supporter of transgender rights, black rights, and LGBTQ+ representation. Rosenfeld has ADHD, which he says contributes to overworking.

== Discography ==
- BAM (2007–2009)
- bps (2007)
- The Whatever Director's Cut (2008)
- Mixes (2008)
- Sine (2008)
- Zweitonegoismus (2008)
- Bushes and Marshmallows (2009)
- A Cobblers Tee Thug (2010) [with Sohnemann]
- Circle (2010)
- Life Changing Moments Seem Minor in Pictures (2010)
- Little Things (2011)
- Minecraft – Volume Alpha (2011)
- I forgot something, didn't I. (2011)
- 72 Minutes of Fame (2011)
- Seven Years of Server Data (2011)
- Catacomb Snatch Original Soundtrack (2012) [with Anosou]
- The Driver - Savlonic (C418 Remix) (2012)
- One (2012)
- Minecraft – Volume Beta (2013)
- 0x10^{c} (2014)
- 148 (2015)
- 2 years of failure (2015)
- Dief (2017)
- Excursions (2018)
- Branching Out (2021)
- Cookie Clicker (2021)
- Wanderstop (2025)
- Wanderstop FM (2025)

== Filmography ==
Year	Title	Director	Type
2012	Minecraft: The Story of Mojang	Paul Owens	Documentary
2017	Beyond Stranger Things	Michael Dempsey	Television series
2025	A Minecraft Movie	Jared Hess	Incorporates original Minecraft music; film score by Mark Mothersbaugh
