= Jordan Magnuson =

Independent game designer

- Born: 1984 (age 41–42); Tunisia
- Notable work: TIGSource

Jordan Magnuson (born 1984) is an American independent game designer known for his minimalistic games, his games about travel, and for creating the indie game-focused website and community TIGSource. Among his games are Loneliness (2012), Freedom Bridge, and The Gametrekking Omnibus. Magnuson is also the founder of the game blog NecessaryGames.com.

Jordan published an open access book in 2023 about video games and poetry, called Game Poems.
