= Minecraft: The Story of Mojang =

2012 documentary film

- Standard DVD cover
- Directed by: Paul Owens
- Produced by: Paul Levering
- Starring: Markus Persson; Jerry Holkins; Mike Krahulik; Geoff Keighley; Logan Decker; Stephen Totilo; Evan Lahti; Minecraft Teacher; SeaNanners; The Shaft; Paul Soares Jr.; The Yogscast; Chris Hecker; Todd Howard; Tim Schafer; Peter Molyneux
- Cinematography: Asif Siddiky
- Music by: C418
- Production company: 2 Player Productions
- Distributed by: 2 Player Productions (digital platforms); Fangamer (physical media)
- Release dates: December 22, 2012 (Xbox Live); December 23, 2012 (digital and physical)
- Running time: 104 minutes
- Countries: United States; Sweden
- Languages: English; Swedish

Minecraft: The Story of Mojang is a 2012 documentary film produced by 2 Player Productions and directed by Paul Owens. It is about the first year of Mojang, the development company founded by game designer Markus "Notch" Persson, and the development and release of Persson's game Minecraft. The film features interviews with prominent game designers affected by Minecraft, popular online figures associated with the game, and segments with fans and community members.

Established by their documentary Reformat the Planet (2008) and work with Penny Arcade, 2 Player Productions had originally wanted to create a series of pilot episodes about various video games, but instead decided to create a full-length film on Minecraft. Announced in January 2011, the production was funded through a Kickstarter campaign grossing over US$210,000, one of the platform's biggest campaigns at the time. Production spanned nearly two years in Europe and North America, following events at Mojang and milestones for Minecraft and Persson. Original Minecraft composer C418 provided the score, which was released as part of his album One.

Minecraft: The Story of Mojang premiered on Xbox Live on December 22, 2012. It was made available for download and streaming the following day by 2 Player Productions, with Fangamer handling its release on DVD. It was well received, gaining praise for its presentation, emotional aspect, charm, and value to fans, though its narrative and informative depth were questioned. 2 Player Productions also uploaded the documentary to the torrent index the Pirate Bay, but urged people to consider purchasing it. The company published the film on YouTube in November 2013, and it had its broadcast television premiere on Fusion TV in March 2015.

== Content ==
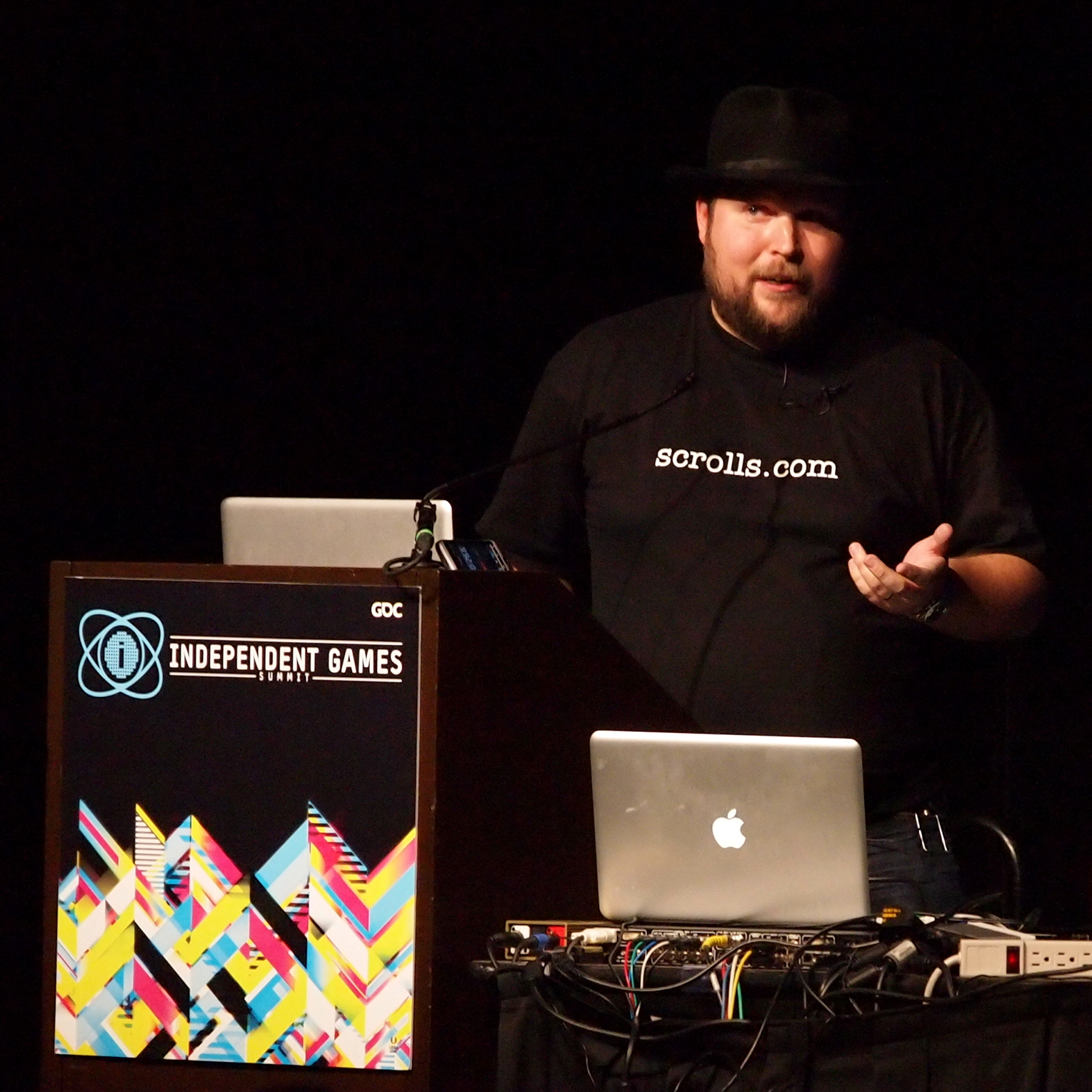
Markus "Notch" Persson, the creator of Minecraft, presenting at Game Developers Conference 2011, a visit documented in the film

Minecraft: The Story of Mojang covers the first twelve months of Mojang's existence. It touches on Minecraft creator Markus "Notch" Persson's childhood in the Swedish countryside, and introduces Persson on New Year's Eve in 2010 as the game began its rise to popularity. The film features a tour of the original Mojang office, introducing the staff and covering the team's concept of the final "finished" version of Minecraft. It follows Persson's first trips out of Sweden to attend the Game Developers Conference and Electronic Entertainment Expo 2011, meeting his fans and collecting awards for the game.

The film also features interviews with prominent game creators Tim Schafer, Chris Hecker, and Peter Molyneux—the latter of whom was inspired by Persson's success to leave his job at Microsoft and found his own studio 22cans—who discuss the game's impact on them and their careers. In Molyneux's interview, he speaks on two perspectives of Minecraft's success: in the first, he views it in the lens of Lego toys, asserting that most contemporary video games compare with Lego sets, in that they are too structured and thus lacking in creative freedom, a crucial element that Minecraft returns to; his second perspective asserts that Minecraft's success should serve as a wake-up call to the video game industry to stop being "complacent" with its strategies. The film also features segments with Minecraft YouTubers the Yogscast and the Shaft, and Matt Needler of the Minecraft FyreUK server speaks on the game's transcendence beyond a game into a creative platform.

Between segments in the film, footage of the works of hardcore players appears, including a 1:1 scale model of the Star Trek ship the Starship Enterprise, a functional calculator, and the work of a popular redstone tutorialist. Besides these segments of elaborate creations, fan videos and community segments are featured. One segment in the film features Mike Krahulik of the webcomic Penny Arcade and his son's experience playing the game; another documents an American teacher who incorporates the game in his lessons, and his students provide commentary on who they think Persson may be; the impact of the game on the teacher's classroom is discussed. It also covers Persson's anticipation of and the launch of the first MineCon, and Persson ceding leadership of the game's development to his employee and colleague Jens Bergensten.

== Cast ==
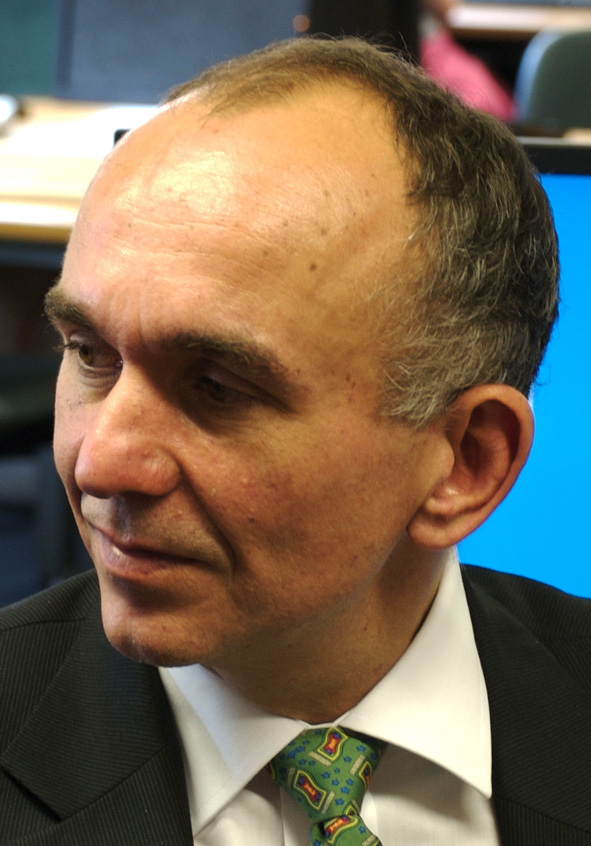
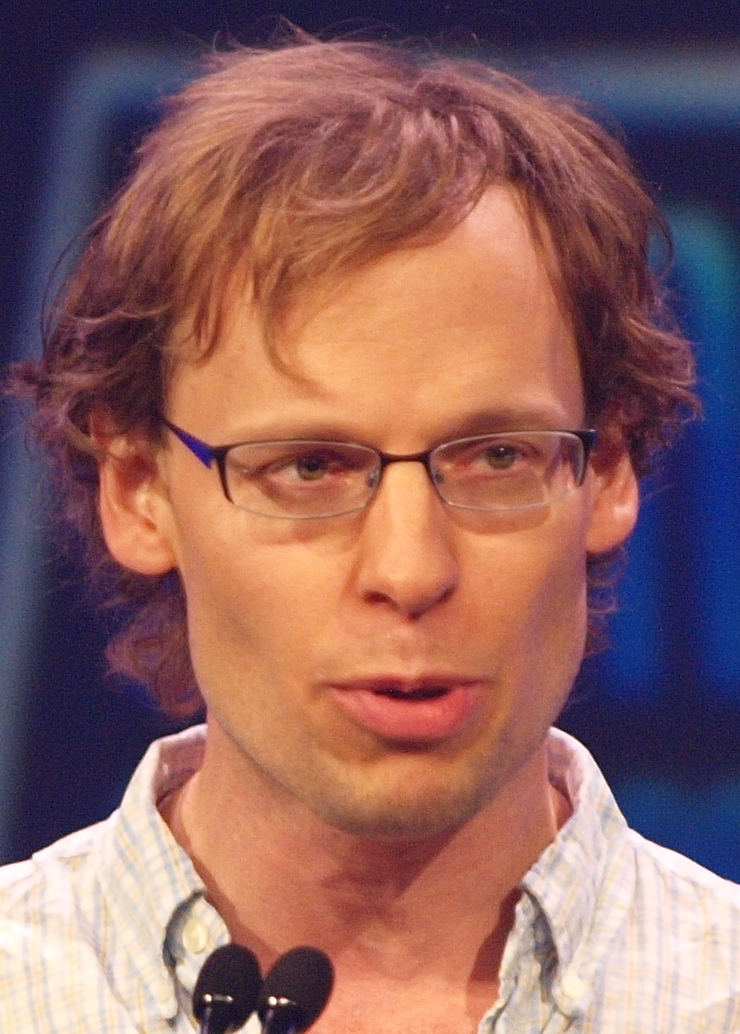
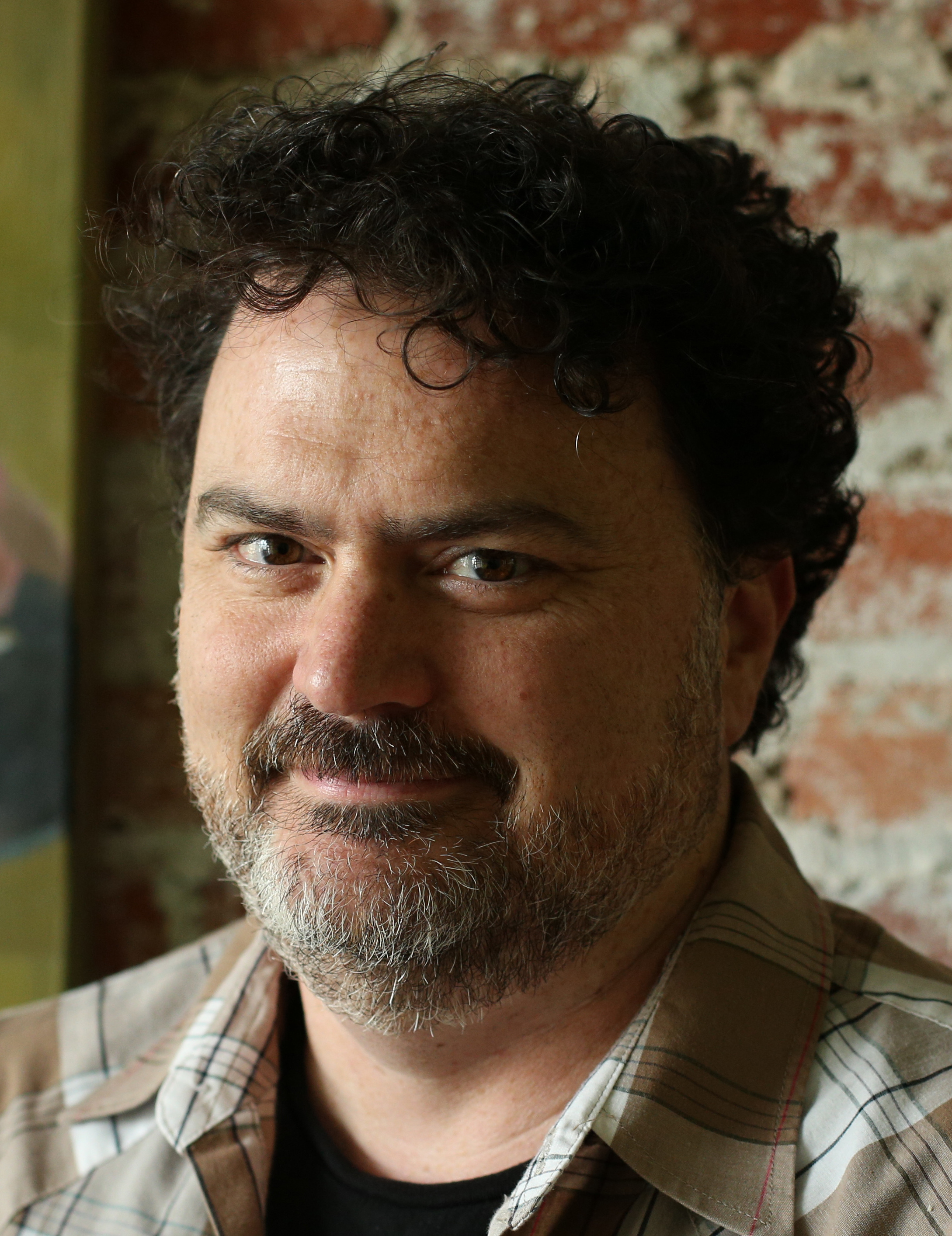
Minecraft: The Story of Mojang features interviews with developers (left to right) Peter Molyneux, Chris Hecker, and Tim Schafer.
- Markus Persson, creator and game designer of Minecraft
- Jerry Holkins, co-creator of the webcomic Penny Arcade
- Mike Krahulik, co-creator of Penny Arcade
- Geoff Keighley, game journalist and television presenter
- Logan Decker
- Stephen Totilo, editor-in-chief of gaming website Kotaku
- Evan Lahti, Kotaku UK editor
- Minecraft Teacher
- SeaNanners, a YouTuber
- The Shaft, podcasters who covered Minecraft
- Paul Soares Jr., American gaming YouTuber
- The Yogscast, a group of YouTubers
- Chris Hecker, video game programmer
- Todd Howard, video game director at Bethesda Game Studios
- Tim Schafer, video game designer who founded Double Fine Productions
- Peter Molyneux, video game designer and co-founder of Lionhead Studios

== Production ==
After gaining notice for their documentary Reformat the Planet (2008) and work with Penny Arcade on their PATV video series, 2 Player Productions conceived the idea to make a series of documentary shorts about various games. Consisting of director Paul Owens, producer Paul Levering, and cinematographer Asif Siddiky, the team realized they were all fans of Minecraft and felt its story would make a good pilot episode, around 20 minutes long. They emailed Persson seeking a meeting in Sweden, staying for around a week. 2 Player Productions stipulated the production would be costless to Persson; they would fund it entirely. Once there, they discovered "there was a lot more story", and decided instead of a pilot on the game's origins, they would produce a full-length film about Mojang's first year. Owens wanted to explore the impact Minecraft had on its players, feeling it had "transcended" beyond a video game, particularly to its fans. In May 2011, 2 Player Productions put out an open call for fan stories for possible inclusion in the film.

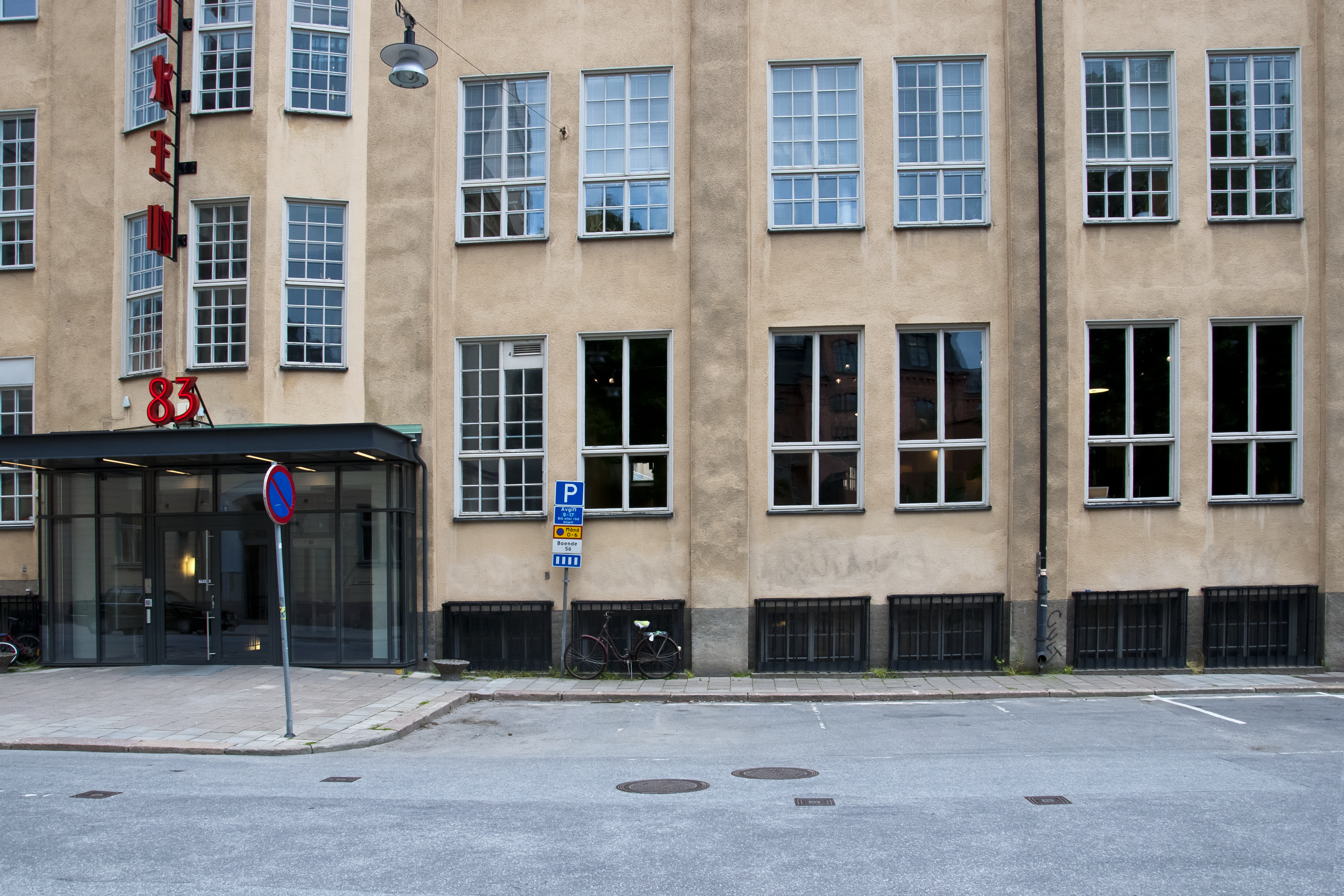
Mojang's original offices, located at Maria Skolgata 83, Stockholm, are a location featured in the film.

To finance the project, 2 Player Productions decided to create a Kickstarter campaign after seeing several successful projects emerge from their colleagues. Alongside a 20-minute proof of concept video, they launched the campaign on February 21, 2011, with a goal of US$150,000; $27,385 was raised within one day, and almost a third of the money was raised by the second. It ultimately raised over $210,000 from 3,641 backers, one of the platform's highest-earning film campaigns at the time. Those who pledged money received increasing tier-based rewards, ranging from $1 to $10,000, the highest of which came with an executive producer credit in the film, spending a day at the Mojang offices, and admittance to the film opening in Stockholm and all the rewards from the lower tiers.

Principal photography took place over the span of nearly two years across Europe and North America. Filming occurred in several phases, with the team making multiple trips to Mojang's offices to document different milestones for the company and Minecraft's development. They shot at the Electronic Entertainment Expo 2011 in June, where Mojang had an appearance, and in August traveled to Sweden to cover Persson's wedding. By February 2012, the film was in post-production, with a 90-minute cut compiled. They returned to Sweden to cover the studio's final thoughts on the year, and traveled through the US to finish all the content required for the film. They scored the finished film and started manufacturing rewards for Kickstarter supporters.

== Soundtrack ==
One
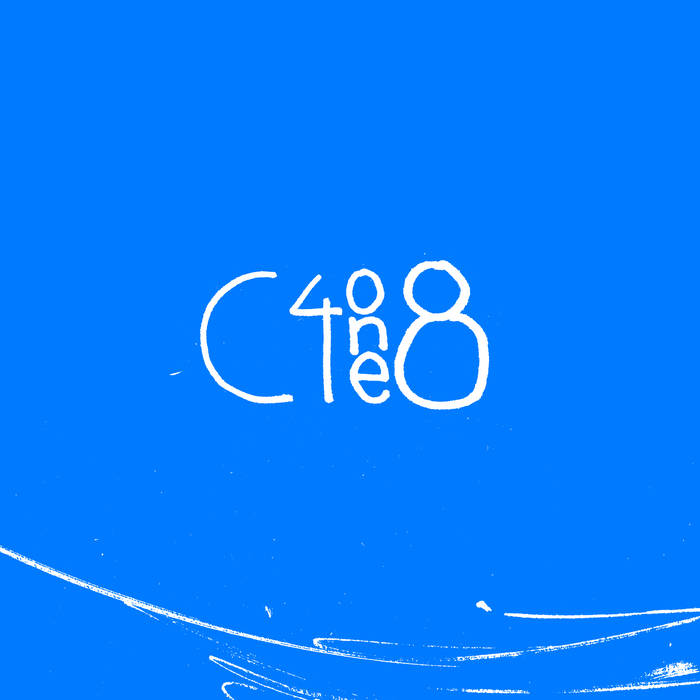

Soundtrack album by C418
- Released: December 23, 2012
- Genre: Electronic
- Length: 95:28; 110:28 (CD)
- Labels: Self-published; Fangamer (CD)
- Producer: C418

C418 chronology
72 Minutes of Fame (2011)	One (2012)	Minecraft – Volume Beta (2013)

One is the soundtrack album to Minecraft: The Story of Mojang, composed by Daniel "C418" Rosenfeld, the game's original composer and sound designer. It was released on December 23, 2012, and contains 31 tracks. Rosenfeld had wanted to work on a film, and agreed when 2 Player Productions asked him to compose the score. To do so, he stopped working on the game "seriously" for about a year and a half. The album was an experiment on the concept of "Schönhören", a word in German roughly meaning "the act of listening to something until you start to like it". Rosenfeld described the album as "pretty relaxed, with a mix of live recorded chiptune, orchestral phrases and a lot of Array mbiras".

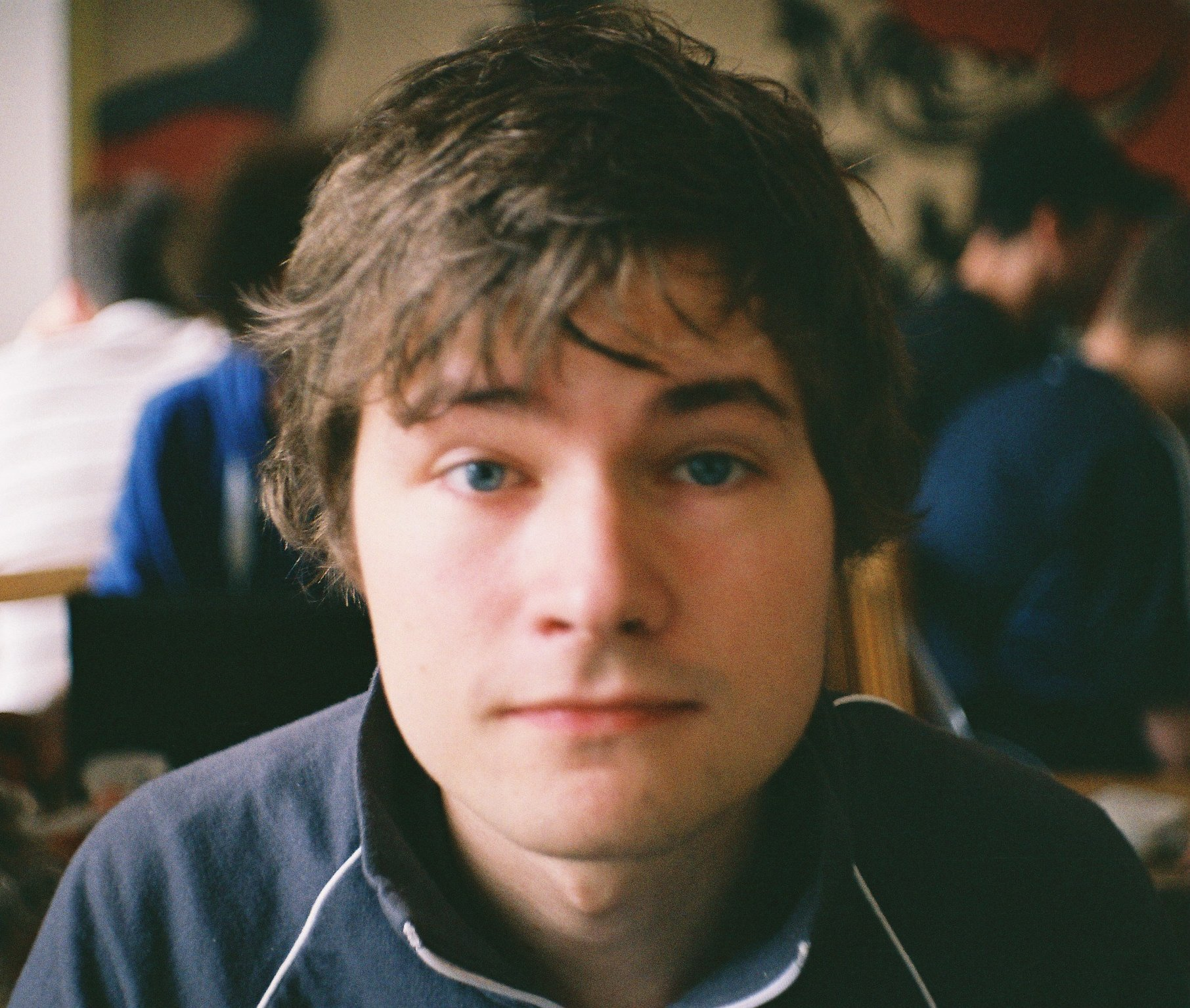
Daniel "C418" Rosenfeld, the composer of Minecraft, provided the score to The Story of Mojang with his album One.

The first song he composed for the film was a seven-minute track synchronized to the first footage he was given, which he described as "basically a failure". He spent two weeks on the first track, and realized composing the entire film like that as a single person was not possible. He would start composing material beginning with a 2–5-second "jingle" sound, and looped it. He would then add a bassline to the four looping notes, choosing a bass sample from chipsounds, a Game Boy sound emulator, and usually doubled up on them because he liked them. Then, he would add a drum track. For one song, he sampled the drums from a James Brown song. For the melody, he would change the key of the music to create it, making patterns such as crescendos.

When it occurred to Rosenfeld that he was composing for a documentary, and that loud music would not be fitting, he decided to "make it longer and louder", a choice he did not understand. He also implemented an mbira called a kalimba with five octaves, matching the chord progression. Finding it unwise to spend €2,000 (equivalent to €2,512 in 2023) on a physical Array mbira, he instead opted to make use of a virtual instrument for the project. He decided to implement this instrument into the entire score, providing a satisfactory theme due to its uniqueness. Rosenfeld eventually decided the music's volume needed to be addressed, and found slowing it down useful. To make the music fit the documentary without being "annoying as hell", he simply did this in places and added in the Game Boy samples. To make the music sound fuller, he added piano, in some places playing it by plucking. Rosenfeld felt the slowness of the music made it mellow and fitting for the emotional moments in the documentary. He then sped the music up again and repeated the process.

One was physically released in CD format by Fangamer. The two-disc pack features exclusive remixes by Crashfaster, Danimal Cannon, Bud Melvin, and minusbaby. Kickstarter supporters of the film who donated US$10 or more received the soundtrack, those who donated $30 or more received a free digital soundtrack download, and those who pledged $60 or more received the physical CD. HobbyConsolas wrote that C418's soundtrack was "spectacular", while Vice called the album a "gleeful and unobtrusive collection of short melodic instrumentals that skip around daintily like cute little bashful kittens, but with a dark self-deprecating humour lurking beneath". Rosenfeld said in 2021 that he considers One his favorite non-Minecraft project because beyond it serving as a soundtrack, he dedicated much of his effort to the quality of the album, and that he enjoyed the way he placed recurring melodies throughout it. He said that this recurrence would "burn" the melodies "in your brain", and would cause the listener to remember "exactly everything very well" once they had finished listening to the album. He said that with this, he hoped the listener would be able to "skip" the part where they would have to re-listen to a given song to learn it.

=== Track listing ===
Composed, produced and mastered by C418.

One track listing
No.	Title	Length
1.	"Cliffside Hinson"	3:46
2.	"Surface Pension"	6:34
3.	"Independent Accident"	4:11
4.	"Danny Makes Chiptune"	2:46
5.	"The First Million"	3:19
6.	"Certitudes"	4:33
7.	"Impostor Syndrome"	2:24
8.	"Buildup Errors"	3:26
9.	"For the Sake of Making Games"	1:33
10.	"Preliminary Art Form"	3:07
11.	"Lawyer Cage Fight"	1:58
12.	"Lost Cousins"	1:31
13.	"Total Drag"	2:47
14.	"Drunken Carboni"	3:04
15.	"The Weirdest Year of Your Life"	3:58
16.	"Swarms"	2:51
17.	"Diskdance"	2:22
18.	"PR Department"	1:25
19.	"Faux Video Production"	3:08
20.	"One Last Game"	1:19
21.	"This Doesn't Work"	5:30
22.	"Wooden Love"	1:33
23.	"I Glove Thy Flob" (featuring Disco^{[a]})	1:47
24.	"Post Success Depression"	3:12
25.	"Social Lego"	4:51
26.	"Jayson Glove"	3:18
27.	"Clumsiness and Innovation"	3:03
28.	"No Pressure"	3:04
29.	"One"	2:27
30.	"Fifflas" (featuring Nifflas)	1:34
31.	"Tsuki no Koibumi" (featuring Laura Shigihara^{[b]})	5:07
Total length:		95:28

CD bonus remixes
No.	Title	Length
32.	"No Pressure" (minusbaby 'But the Snow in Brooklyn')	4:35
33.	"Jayson Glove" (Bud Melvin '2 players 1 little piggy')	4:14
34.	"The First Million" (Danimal Cannon 'MultiMillion Mix')	2:59
35.	"Preliminary Art Form" (Crashfaster 'Nether Mix')	3:12
Total length:		110:28

Notes

- ^{^[a]} Composition by Johann "D Major" Pachelbel, rearranged by Disco and C418
- ^{^[b]} Voice and lyrics by Laura Shigihara

== Release ==
2 Player Productions announced Minecraft: The Story of Mojang in January 2011, alongside some production stills. By October 2012, director Paul Owens expected an early December release date, aiming for the 7th of that month. That month, 2 Player Productions released four more stills from the film. In November, a clip of the film was included in an episode of PC Gamer Digital, which featured Persson coding exploding arrows. At the 2012 Minecon in Paris, Rosenfeld made an appearance, where he gave a talk to the audience about the process of writing the film's score. The first trailer was released on December 18, 2012.

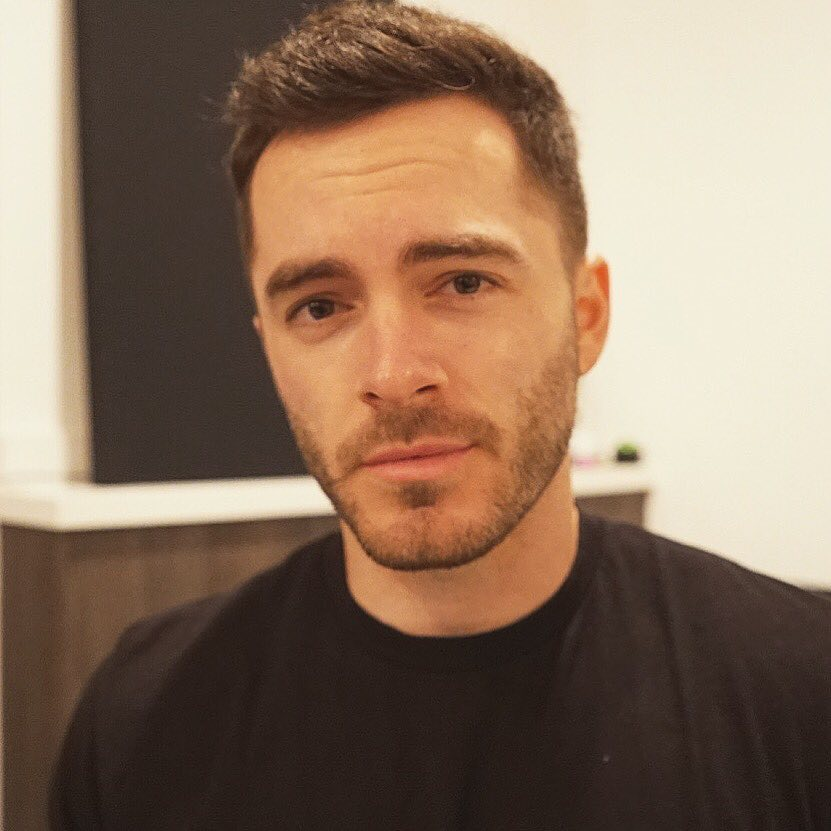
After Minecraft: The Story of Mojang had its broadcast television premiere in 2015, Minecraft YouTuber CaptainSparklez co-hosted its aftershow.

The film premiered at 8:00 pm Eastern Standard Time on Xbox Live on December 22, 2012, in Austria, Belgium, France, Finland, Ireland, Portugal, Sweden, the UK, and US, free for Xbox Live Gold members. It was made available for streaming and digital rights management (DRM)-free download the following day on December 23. Also that day, Fangamer released the film on DVD, with the first 7,000 copies wrapped in a custom "dirt brown" case and reversible cover, and coming with a free 720p download code. As a measure to address the inevitability of the film being pirated, 2 Player Productions uploaded the documentary to the torrent index the Pirate Bay before it was released, admitting there were "fine" reasons as to why it would be pirated, including its Xbox exclusive debut. They however urged people to consider purchasing the film.

On March 18, 2013, the film was released on digital distributor VHX in two editions: "family friendly" with the option to stream instantly or DRM-free download; and a more expensive version including a commentary track, a segment with Minecraft: Xbox 360 Edition developer 4J Studios, and deleted scenes. On November 11, 2013, 2 Player Productions released it for free on their YouTube channel. The film made its broadcast television premiere on Fusion TV on March 22, 2015, with an aftershow, Talking Minecraft, hosted by YouTube personalities CaptainSparklez and JeromeASF.

== Reception ==
Minecraft: The Story of Mojang was well received. Kotaku's Matt Hawkins hailed the film as "what Indie Game: The Movie wishes that it was, but most definitely is not". He remarked that the filmmakers' presentation was done in "the most restrained, calm, and graceful manner possible", and called it "virtually perfect". He observed that "every single moment, no matter how understated, adds to the overall tapestry", and praised its accessibility in being able to make anyone invest in it, hailing that as "the true hallmark of a good documentary". Eurogamer's Dan Whitehead felt the film could have been more detailed, and found it "disappointingly ironic" that the film failed to unearth "blocks of narrative ore". He criticized the midsection, which he considered disjointed, but felt the interviews added weight to the theme of humanity. While he felt it was not "illuminating", he admitted it was pleasant and served as "charming fluff" and a sweet tribute to the game for its fans. HobbyConsolas's Alberto Lloret wrote it was not as intense or emotional as other documentaries, but felt the pacing was fine and that the analysis of the phenomenon surrounding Minecraft made it interesting to watch.

PCGamesN's Paul Dean said it was satisfying as a film by fans for fans, and highlighted the moments when "someone has more to say" and has "a meaningful insight into what Minecraft really is and the impact that it has had", singling out Molyneux's interview. He concluded it was "a light, fluffy feelgood documentary", but it didn't bring detail or new information. He felt it was charming and "frequently" sweet, but not deep. Lloret shared similar thoughts on the scope, feeling critical that the perspective was limited to only one game and one development team, while Rock Paper Shotgun's Alec Meer concurred that it was fluffy, to be seen as a "celebration rather than investigation" of the game, and praised the production values and cast of the film. Critics at Large's Justin Cummings wrote that it was "not revelatory or highly dramatized, acting more as just an edited recounting of events – which is good, considering that this film might be seen in years to come as an important chronicle of a pivotal point in video game history". Cummings praised its "moments of sincere emotion" and function as "a neat time capsule kind of entertainment", hoping it would be remembered as "a work of significance and captivating humility" in the future.
