= Music of Minecraft =

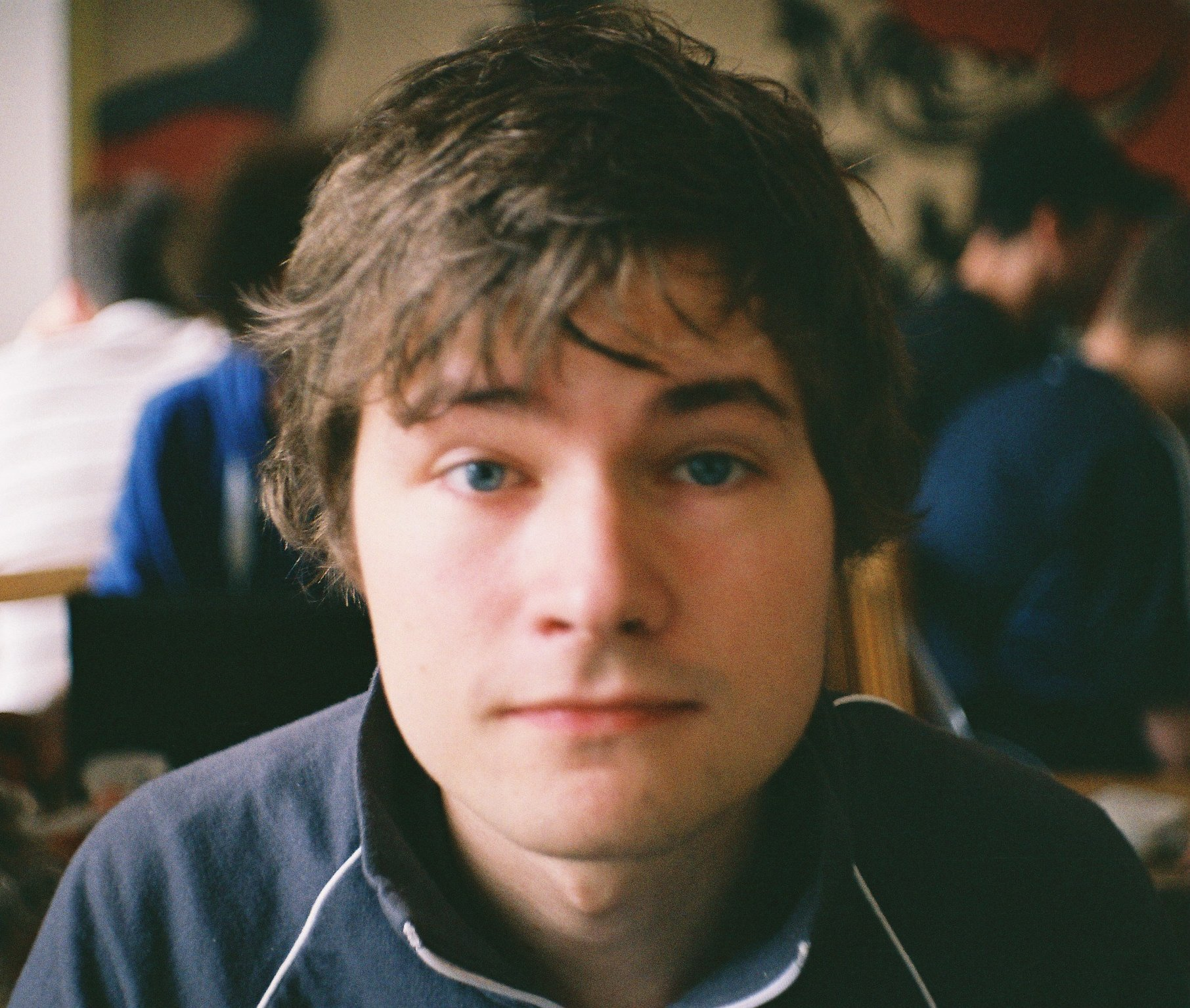
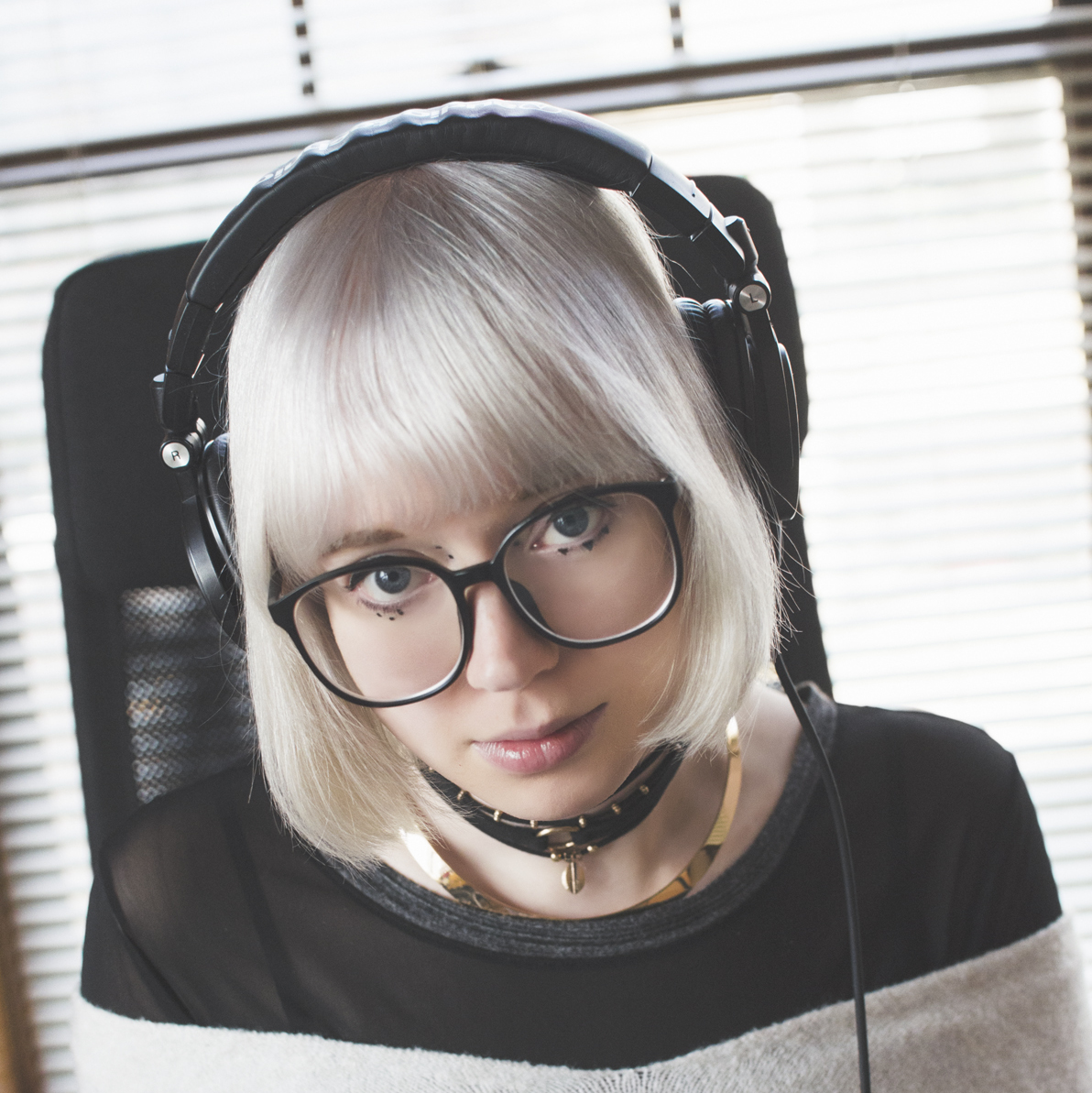
C418 (left) and Lena Raine (right) have been two of the main contributors to the music of Minecraft.

The music of the 2011 video game Minecraft, developed by Mojang Studios, primarily consists of two soundtrack albums by German musician Daniel Rosenfeld, better known as C418. American composer Lena Raine has also contributed music for four major updates to the game since 2020, alongside Aaron Cherof, Kumi Tanioka, Amos Roddy and fingerspit who have worked on the most recent versions in 2024, 2025 and 2026. Music included in downloadable content (DLC) for legacy console versions of the game was handled by British musician Gareth Coker.

Rosenfeld was the sole contributor of music in the Java Edition of the game until 2020. He has released two albums containing his work for the game, with Minecraft – Volume Alpha in 2011 and its follow-up double album Minecraft – Volume Beta in 2013, when Minecraft released version 1.7.2, and three singles originally meant for release under a third soundtrack album were each released throughout 2018. His works have been lauded by music critics and the video game community – both released albums have received several pressings to vinyl and have held prominent positions on the Billboard Top Dance/Electronic Albums chart, with the former being certified gold by the RIAA in the United States for selling 500,000 units.

Alongside the launch of various DLC for legacy console editions of Minecraft in 2016, Coker issued three soundtrack albums, producing an additional three in the following four years. In 2020, Raine composed the soundtrack for the "Nether Update", and has since worked on the music for three more updates alongside Kumi Tanioka and Samuel Åberg. In 2023, Cherof contributed five new songs to the game's "Trails & Tales" update. Citing licensing issues and legal conflicts with Microsoft, a completed third album by Rosenfeld, which was first teased in 2015 and confirmed in 2017, has still not seen release as of 2026. All contributions to the game's soundtrack by artists other than Rosenfeld are owned by and have been released under Microsoft's own label.

== Background and artistry ==
=== C418 ===
German musician Daniel Rosenfeld had been making music under the moniker C418 since he was 15 years old, and was influenced by the electronic work of Aphex Twin. From 2007, he became active on online indie game community TIGSource where he met Markus Persson, who was still in the early stages of developing Minecraft. Rosenfeld was given creative freedom to create a soundtrack for the tech demo, and opted to make ambient music reminiscent of the works of Brian Eno and Vangelis. He was interested in "games with music that takes you completely by surprise," citing Dwarf Fortress as inspiration. Therefore, Rosenfeld wanted to "make something organic and partly electronic, partly acoustic" for Minecraft. Further, he intended to make the music as unintrusive to the player as possible, as if "they'd only notice it when something interesting happens in the game." However, the soundtrack's minimalistic style was also due to technical constraints, as he admitted the game "has a terrible sound engine."

Persson chose to commission the music from Rosenfeld, meaning the artist still retains ownership of all the music he made for Minecraft. Both the soundtrack albums also contain music not intended for the game, "extending the album into a more cohesive piece that can be played on its own."

=== Lena Raine ===
In 2020, American composer Lena Raine was contacted by Mojang Studios to compose music for the "Nether Update" in Minecraft. She had previously handled the soundtrack for video game Celeste (2018), and had just released her debut studio album Oneknowing (2019). In composing music for Minecraft, she felt "immense pressure" to deliver due to the "very highly acclaimed score" already in the game. After submitting a demo, her goal with the "Nether Update" soundtrack was to see how far she "could push the sound of the piano until it resembled other things entirely." With her third contributions to the game in 2022, Raine wrote she wanted to "focus the musical style around more of a blend between synths and live instrumentation," while continuing to use "strings, piano, and woodwinds in places."

== Albums ==
=== Minecraft – Volume Alpha ===
The first installment of the game's soundtrack, Minecraft – Volume Alpha, was released digitally on 4 March 2011 independently by Rosenfeld. In June 2015, the record received its first pressing to vinyl and CD through American record label Ghostly. In 2022, the album was nominated for Top Dance/Electronic Album at the Billboard Music Awards.

The album was met with positive reviews, with Andy Kellman from AllMusic praising its replay value, stating that "none of the recurring elements is pronounced or simple enough to become fatiguing with repeated play". In 2011, video game blog Kotaku called it one of the best video game soundtracks of that year. "Sweden", one of the songs in the album, is one of the most-streamed songs from a video game on Spotify, with over 225 million streams.

In 2025, the complete album of Volume Alpha was added to the United States Library of Congress. Carla Hayden, the Librarian of Congress, said "These are the sounds of America--our wide-ranging history and culture. The National Recording Registry is our evolving nation's playlist."

=== Minecraft – Volume Beta ===
Minecraft – Volume Beta

Soundtrack album by C418
- Released: 9 November 2013
- Genres: Electronic; ambient
- Length: 141:08
- Label: Self-released

C418 chronology
One (2012)	Minecraft – Volume Beta (2013)	0x10c (2014)

The second installment of the game's soundtrack, Volume Beta, was released on 9 November 2013. Like Volume Alpha, Volume Beta comprises most of the music featured in the game, including dedicated music for the game's nether and main menu. It also features music from trailers, and instrumentals not in the game's final release. In 2013 and 2023, the album appeared on the Billboard Dance/Electronic Albums chart, peaking at number 14 both times. It received its first pressing to vinyl and CD through Ghostly in 2020.

The mostly ambient album has a generally darker tone than its precursor. Rosenfeld described the track "Alpha" as a medley and "a celebration of past music from Volume Alpha." The first song he had composed with the clear intent for the game's "creative mode" to have a distinct soundtrack was "Blind Spots". The track "Taswell" was created as a tribute to Rosenfeld's friend, the late Ryan "Taswell" Davis, the co-founder of American gaming website Giant Bomb. Rosenfeld stated he "didn't want to remember them for their death, but the happiness they showed every day of their life." Rosenfeld admits that the record is "extremely varied", being "much more percussive, melodic, and progressive" than Volume Alpha. Several songs on the album are remakes of themes from the prior soundtrack album Volume Alpha; "Ki", "Moog City 2", "Mutation", and "Beginning 2" are remakes of the songs "Key", "Moog City", "Minecraft", and "Beginning", respectively.

No.	Title	Length
1.	"Ki"	1:32
2.	"Alpha"	10:03
3.	"Dead Voxel"	4:56
4.	"Blind Spots"	5:32
5.	"Flake"	2:50
6.	"Moog City 2"	3:00
7.	"Concrete Halls"	4:14
8.	"Biome Fest"	6:18
9.	"Mutation"	3:05
10.	"Haunt Muskie"	6:01
11.	"Warmth"	3:59
12.	"Floating Trees"	4:04
13.	"Aria Math"	5:10
14.	"Kyoto"	4:09
15.	"Ballad of the Cats"	4:35
16.	"Taswell"	8:35
17.	"Beginning 2"	2:56
18.	"Dreiton"	8:17
19.	"The End"	15:04
20.	"Chirp"	3:06
21.	"Wait"	3:54
22.	"Mellohi"	1:38
23.	"Stal"	2:32
24.	"Strad"	3:08
25.	"Eleven"	1:11
26.	"Ward"	4:10
27.	"Mall"	3:18
28.	"Blocks"	5:43
29.	"Far"	3:12
30.	"Intro"	4:36
Total length:		2:20:48

=== Minecraft: Nether Update ===
Minecraft: Nether Update (Original Game Soundtrack)

Soundtrack album by Lena Raine
- Released: 14 June 2020
- Genres: Ambient; soundtrack; video game; electronic; dubstep
- Length: 20:32
- Label: Microsoft Studios Music
- Producer: Lena Raine

Lena Raine chronology
Celeste: Farewell (Original Soundtrack) (2019)	Minecraft: Nether Update (Original Game Soundtrack) (2020)	Reknowing (2020)

On 10 April 2020, it was announced Lena Raine had composed music for the game's "Nether Update". On the sequencing of her three new soundtrack songs, Raine claimed she "wanted each piece to feel like a progression of emotions, or a journey from place to place within this other world." The extended play (EP) also contains a new in-game music disc, "Pigstep", which has two different mixes on the soundtrack version, released 14 June 2020. Unlike Rosenfeld's independently released albums, Raine's work is owned by and published through Microsoft Studios Music.

No.	Title	Length
1.	"Chrysopoeia"	5:03
2.	"Rubedo"	5:12
3.	"So Below"	5:19
4.	"Pigstep" (Mono Mix)	2:28
5.	"Pigstep" (Stereo Mix)	2:28
Total length:		20:32

=== Minecraft: Caves & Cliffs ===
Minecraft: Caves & Cliffs (Original Game Soundtrack)

Soundtrack album by Lena Raine and Kumi Tanioka
- Released: 20 October 2021
- Genres: Ambient; soundtrack; video game; electronic
- Length: 47:46
- Label: Microsoft Studios Music
- Producers: Lena Raine; Kumi Tanioka

On 20 October 2021, the fourth official release of the Minecraft soundtrack was released, with 10 new tracks coinciding with the game's "Caves & Cliffs" update. Seven of them were composed by Raine, including "Otherside", a new in-game music disc, and three were handled by Japanese composer Kumi Tanioka, known for her work in the Final Fantasy series.

Tracks 1–7 by Lena Raine; 8–10 by Kumi Tanioka
No.	Title	Length
1.	"Stand Tall"	5:08
2.	"Left to Bloom"	5:42
3.	"Ancestry"	5:43
4.	"Wending"	5:14
5.	"Infinite Amethyst"	4:31
6.	"One More Day"	4:38
7.	"Otherside"	3:15
8.	"Floating Dream"	3:25
9.	"Comforting Memories"	4:35
10.	"An Ordinary Day"	5:31
Total length:		47:46

=== Minecraft: The Wild Update ===
Minecraft: The Wild Update (Original Game Soundtrack)

Soundtrack album by Lena Raine and Samuel Åberg
- Released: 20 April 2022
- Genres: Ambient; soundtrack; video game; electronic
- Length: 18:32
- Label: Microsoft Studios Music
- Producers: Lena Raine; Samuel Åberg

The fifth installment of the game's soundtrack, including songs introduced in "The Wild Update", was released on 20 April 2022. It contains three new tracks by Raine, and a new music disc, "Five", composed by Mojang audio director Samuel Åberg.

Tracks 1–3 by Lena Raine; 4 by Samuel Åberg
No.	Title	Length
1.	"Firebugs"	5:12
2.	"Aerie"	4:56
3.	"Labyrinthine"	5:24
4.	"Five"	2:58
Total length:		18:32

=== Minecraft: Trails & Tales ===
Minecraft: Trails & Tales (Original Game Soundtrack)

Soundtrack album by Aaron Cherof
- Released: 26 April 2023
- Genres: Ambient; electronic
- Length: 21:56
- Label: Microsoft Studios Music
- Producer: Aaron Cherof

Aaron Cherof chronology
Sunshine Heavy Industries (Original Soundtrack) (2021)	Minecraft: Trails & Tales (Original Game Soundtrack) (2023)	Cobalt Core (Original Soundtrack) (2023)

On 26 April 2023, Mojang announced American composer Aaron Cherof had contributed five new tracks to the game, to be introduced in the "Trails & Tales" update.

No.	Title	Length
1.	"Echo in the Wind"	4:56
2.	"A Familiar Room"	4:01
3.	"Bromeliad"	5:12
4.	"Crescent Dunes"	4:08
5.	"Relic"	3:38
Total length:		21:56

=== Minecraft: Tricky Trials ===
Minecraft: Tricky Trials (Original Game Soundtrack)

Soundtrack album by Aaron Cherof, Kumi Tanioka & Lena Raine
- Released: 26 April 2024
- Genres: Ambient; electronic
- Length: 56:32
- Label: Microsoft Studios Music

On 26 April 2024, the soundtrack for the 1.21 "Tricky Trials" Update of Minecraft was released on digital streaming platforms. The album combines music from Cherof, Tanioka and Raine for the first time.

Tracks 1–3, 12 by Aaron Cherof; 4–6 by Kumi Tanioka; 7–11 by Lena Raine
No.	Title	Length
1.	"Featherfall"	5:44
2.	"Watcher"	5:32
3.	"Puzzlebox"	4:59
4.	"Komorebi"	4:47
5.	"Pokopoko"	5:04
6.	"Yakusoku"	4:31
7.	"Deeper"	5:03
8.	"Eld Unknown"	4:56
9.	"Endless"	6:42
10.	"Creator"	2:57
11.	"Creator (Music Box Version)"	1:14
12.	"Precipice"	4:59
Total length:		56:32

=== Minecraft: Chase the Skies ===
Minecraft: Chase the Skies (Original Game Soundtrack)

Soundtrack album by Amos Roddy
- Released: 13 May 2025
- Genres: Ambient; electronic
- Length: 21:07
- Label: Microsoft Studios Music

On 13 May 2025, the soundtrack to the "Chase the Skies" update was released, including six songs composed by Amos Roddy.

No.	Title	Length
1.	"Lilypad"	3:55
2.	"Below and Above"	3:32
3.	"O's Piano"	4:35
4.	"Broken Clocks"	3:33
5.	"Fireflies"	2:35
6.	"Tears"	2:55
Total length:		21:07

=== Minecraft: Chaos Cubed ===
Minecraft: Chaos Cubed (Original Game Soundtrack)

Soundtrack album by fingerspit
- Released: 12 May 2026
- Genres: Ambient; electronic
- Length: 29:48
- Label: Microsoft Studios Music

On 12 May 2026, the soundtrack to Minecraft's "Chaos Cubed" update was released. It includes six songs by Paula Ruiz, known as fingerspit.

No.	Title	Length
1.	"Memories"	4:05
2.	"Ebb"	5:06
3.	"Home"	6:20
4.	"Shores"	5:20
5.	"Nightly"	5:02
6.	"Bounce"	3:54
Total length:		29:48

== Unreleased third C418 album ==
In a 2011 Reddit AmA, Daniel Rosenfeld stated his plans to create a third soundtrack album, Volume Final, after the release of Minecraft – Volume Beta. Rosenfeld first revealed development of the album in a 2015 interview with Fact Magazine, commenting, "I'll still work on Minecraft, so there'll probably be another album. In fact, it's gonna be more ambient than the others, just as an experiment." He also noted listeners' own applications of his previous works, remarking, "I'm interested in seeing how people use music as a sleep aid, so I think on the next album I might put a bonus track on there that's just 15 minutes of complete ambience and see what people think." Rosenfeld again expressed interest in composing an ambient bonus track for his third album in a tweet posted in December of that year.

In a 2017 tweet, the musician confirmed the album's existence and said that it was set for future release, but that work on it at that point was "still far from done". Rosenfeld additionally stated that the record would be longer than the previous two albums combined, which in total clocks in at over 3 hours and 18 minutes. Rosenfeld additionally reiterated on Twitter that the third album would not be called "Minecraft – Volume Gamma", deviating from the Greek Alphabet naming convention used in the previous two Minecraft albums he composed.

Of the work Rosenfeld did on the third volume, he commented, "When I started making a third Minecraft album, I didn't expect it to have this much work involved. I think I'm seeing the end of the tunnel?" On 8 January 2021, Rosenfeld was asked in an interview with Anthony Fantano whether or not the third volume of the soundtrack was still in production. Rosenfeld responded, saying, "I have something—I consider it finished—but things have become complicated, especially as Minecraft is now a big property, so I don't know." Later that year, he would elaborate on his Discord server, saying:

"I still want to do stuff for Minecraft, but I've never managed to get to an agreement with the big guys. I have a lot of music but only time will tell how we will get it out. It will involve at least 20 lawyers."

Rosenfeld said in 2025 that he was glad that his time with Minecraft was "chosen for me that it's done" so he could focus on a normal career—Rosenfeld made note of "a lot of ruminations going on" about whether he would release a work for Minecraft again, and said that he would be content if he does not complete further work for the game.

== Further contributions ==
=== Singles ===
On 16 July 2018, three new songs from C418 were added to the game for "Update Aquatic". It marked the first new contributions from Rosenfeld to Minecraft since Minecraft - Volume Beta in 2013. The three tracks were released digitally from August – "Dragon Fish" on 9 August, "Shuniji" on 10 November, and "Axolotl" on 12 December 2018. Rosenfeld was asked by Mojang to create music with "slow beats" for the aquatic music, in a style similar to the music of Donkey Kong Country, though after he first wrote the songs, Mojang wanted more of the "Donkey Kong Country" aspect. Rosenfeld slowed the music down and brought out more high frequencies, and Mojang was satisfied.

On 25 June 2025, a fourth single from Minecraft's soundtrack was released. It was added in update 1.21.7, being a remix of "Steve's Lava Chicken" from A Minecraft Movie by Ian Tsuchiura, also known as "Hyper Potions". It's available as a music disc in-game.

The fifth single from the Minecraft soundtrack was released on 3 November 2026, named "Flurry". It's an original composition by Tsuchiura, and just like "Lava Chicken", it's one of the in-game music discs.

=== DLC soundtrack ===
While Rosenfeld once composed holiday themed music in downloadable content (DLC) for console editions of the game in 2014, British composer Gareth Coker has been responsible for the bulk of music for DLC in the Legacy Console Editions.

On 21 December 2016, Coker released the albums Battle & Tumble, Chinese Mythology, and Greek Mythology to complement three downloadable packs in the Legacy Console Editions. Two more records of similar themes, Norse Mythology and Egyptian Mythology, were released in December 2017 and May 2018 respectively. Coker's final album for DLC was for the Glide Mini Game, releasing on 22 December 2020. Unlike previous work by Rosenfeld, all of Coker's albums for Minecraft were released under Microsoft's own label.

● Minecraft: Battle & Tumble (Original Soundtrack) (2016)

No.	Title	Length
1.	"Toys on a Tear" (Shrunk)	2:30
2.	"Dance of the Blocks" (Shrunk)	2:15
3.	"Master Builder" (Shrunk)	2:35
4.	"Double Time" (Tumble)	1:14
5.	"Nimbly Does It" (Tumble)	1:10
6.	"Chop Chop" (Tumble)	1:06
7.	"Agile Accelerando" (Tumble)	1:11
8.	"Lickety Split" (Tumble)	1:12
9.	"Time is of the Essence" (Tumble)	1:04
10.	"Swift Descent" (Tumble)	1:13
11.	"Dashing on the Double" (Tumble)	1:07
12.	"Pronto" (Tumble)	1:00
13.	"BreakneckBoogie" (Tumble)	1:09
14.	"Hastilude" (Fantasy)	3:47
15.	"Crusaders" (Fantasy)	3:38
16.	"Born to Arms" (Fantasy)	2:12
17.	"8-Bits, Pieces & Chunks" (City)	2:59
18.	"Beat Around the Block" (City)	3:16
19.	"From District to District" (City)	3:14
20.	"Precincts at Night" (City)	3:03
21.	"Industrial Quarter" (City)	3:38
22.	"Clockwork Crafter" (Steampunk)	3:00
23.	"Magnificent Machines" (Steampunk)	3:44
24.	"Steaming Superstructures" (Steampunk)	3:10
25.	"Airship Adventurers" (Steampunk)	2:50
26.	"Sunset Riders" (Frontier)	2:28
27.	"The Outlaw" (Frontier)	2:52
28.	"Desert Duel" (Frontier)	2:20
29.	"Ghosts in the Tower" (Halloween)	2:31
30.	"Warped World" (Halloween)	2:44
31.	"Happy Halloween" (Halloween)	2:46
32.	"Wondrous Workshop" (Festive)	2:45
33.	"Crafter's Candy Canes" (Festive)	2:18
34.	"Giftwrapped" (Festive)	2:36
Total length:		1:20:37

● Minecraft: Chinese Mythology (Original Soundtrack) (2016)

No.	Title	Length
1.	"Xuanzang"	3:43
2.	"Chang'an - Perpetual Peace" (Overworld)	3:31
3.	"Jinshan Temple" (Overworld)	3:01
4.	"Tianxi Mountains" (Overworld)	3:52
5.	"Sun Wukong" (Battle)	3:26
6.	"White Dragon Horse" (Battle)	2:25
7.	"Hotan Ruins" (Nether)	3:12
8.	"Majishan Grotto" (Nether)	3:12
9.	"Mountains of Infinite Longevity" (Overworld)	3:54
10.	"Hanging Monastery" (Overworld)	3:51
11.	"Zhu Baije" (Battle)	3:31
12.	"Sha Wujing" (Battle)	3:19
13.	"Terracotta Army" (The End)	2:42
14.	"Tsaparang" (Nether)	3:13
15.	"Kunlun Mountains" (Overworld)	2:37
16.	"Mount Huaguo" (Overworld)	2:56
17.	"Danxia Rainbow Mountains" (Overworld)	2:40
Total length:		55:05

● Minecraft: Greek Mythology (Original Soundtrack) (2016)

No.	Title	Length
1.	"Seikilo's Epitaph" (feat. Aeralie Brighton)	3:09
2.	"Demeter - God of Farming" (Overworld)	3:32
3.	"Artemis - Goddess of the Wilderness" (Nether)	2:51
4.	"Lelantos - God of Moving Unseen" (Battle)	3:29
5.	"Hades & Persephone - Gods of the Underworld" (Nether)	3:25
6.	"Apollo - God of Music and the Lyre" (Overworld)	2:56
7.	"Zeus & Hera - King and Queen of the Gods" (Overworld)	2:28
8.	"Ares - God of War" (The End)	2:23
9.	"Poseidon - God of the Sea" (Overworld)	3:18
10.	"Hermes - The Messenger God" (Overworld)	3:35
11.	"Hephaestus - God of the Forge" (Nether)	2:42
12.	"Homados - God of Battlenoise & Tumult" (Battle)	3:47
13.	"Britomartis - Goddess of the Hunt" (Battle)	2:40
14.	"Hestia - Goddess of the Hearth" (Overworld)	3:11
15.	"Aphrodite - Goddess of Love" (Overworld)	4:08
Total length:		47:34

● Minecraft: Norse Mythology (Original Soundtrack) (2017)

No.	Title	Length
1.	"Asgard" (Overworld)	3:36
2.	"Jotrunheim" (Overworld)	2:57
3.	"Midgard" (Overworld)	2:58
4.	"Aegir and Ran" (Nether)	4:04
5.	"Vanaheim" (Overworld)	3:39
6.	"Alfheim" (Overworld)	3:07
7.	"Valhalla" (Nether)	4:36
8.	"Svartalfheim" (Overworld)	2:42
9.	"Muspelheim" (Overworld)	3:05
10.	"Folkvangr" (Overworld)	3:15
11.	"Hel" (Nether)	3:19
12.	"Einherjar" (The End)	3:03
Total length:		40:21

● Minecraft: Egyptian Mythology (Original Soundtrack) (2018)

No.	Title	Length
1.	"The Great Pyramids" (Overworld)	3:23
2.	"Hathor" (Overworld)	3:35
3.	"Hibis" (Overworld)	3:35
4.	"Journey Through the Duat" (Nether)	3:30
5.	"Shai" (Interlude)	1:33
6.	"Alexandria" (Overworld)	3:17
7.	"Heliopolis" (Overworld)	3:05
8.	"Temple of Isis" (Overworld)	2:57
9.	"Judges of the Dead" (Nether)	3:56
10.	"Renenutet & Meshkenet" (Interlude)	1:29
11.	"Abu Simbel" (Overworld)	3:16
12.	"Memphis" (Overworld)	3:19
13.	"Final Judgement" (Nether)	3:27
14.	"Osiris" (The End)	2:56
Total length:		43:18

● Minecraft: Glide Mini Game (Original Soundtrack) (2020)

No.	Title	Length
1.	"In the Flow" (Map 4)	2:06
2.	"Flight of Fancy" (Map 3)	2:26
3.	"Glide" (Map 1)	2:11
4.	"Departures" (Map 7)	2:00
5.	"Soothing Voyage" (Map 2)	2:05
6.	"Tense Takeoff" (Map 6)	2:06
7.	"Wonderful Wings" (Map 5)	2:04
8.	"Shrunk Soaring" (Shrunk 1)	2:09
9.	"Pacy Piloting" (Shrunk 3)	1:59
10.	"Wicked Wings" (Shrunk 2)	2:00
11.	"Velocity and Dynamism" (Body 2)	2:07
12.	"Locomotion" (Body 1)	2:22
13.	"Mobile Maneuvers" (Body 3)	2:05
14.	"Progression and Passage" (Canyon 2)	2:04
15.	"Canyon Clearance" (Canyon 1)	2:17
16.	"Roaming Wanderer" (Canyon 3)	2:04
17.	"Icaria" (Icarus 2)	2:10
18.	"Wings of Daedalus" (Icarus 1)	1:58
19.	"Aviation" (Excalibur 2)	2:05
20.	"Excalibur Excursion" (Excalibur 1)	2:04
21.	"Celtic Crossing" (Celtic 1)	2:20
22.	"Tour of Tors" (Celtic 2)	2:11
23.	"Yinglong" (Chinese Mythology 1)	2:02
24.	"Pixiu" (Chinese Mythology 2)	1:56
25.	"Tianma" (Chinese Mythology 3)	2:22
Total length:		53:13

== Reception ==
The soundtrack's minimalistic and melancholic composition has been praised by critics. Keith Stuart of The Guardian noted that Rosenfeld's "wilting, minimalist tracks, slow-paced and slightly melancholy, recall the ambient works of Satie and Eno", calling it the game's "perfect accompaniment." In 2018, Jamie Hornsey of student newspaper The Boar described the soundtrack's composition as "nostalgia in its purest form," adding: "By encouraging players to associate pieces of music with certain actions, the game becomes capable of conjuring incredibly vivid images in the player's mind."

Much of the soundtrack's retrospective praise has been directed at Volume Alpha, where Evan Tridone of The Review called the album "arguably the best ambient album to be released this decade." Writing for Kotaku, Luke Plunkett praised it as a "great album" and as "tranquil as a good night's sleep."

The staff teams of several news outlets have considered the Minecraft soundtrack to be among the best video game soundtracks of all time. These include the editorial teams of NME, Digital Trends, GamesRadar+, and VG247. In 2022, the Minecraft soundtrack placed at number 54 on Australian radio station ABC Classic's top 100 countdown, as voted by listeners.

== Charts ==
=== Volume Alpha charts ===
==== Weekly charts ====
Weekly chart performance for Minecraft – Volume Alpha
Chart (2022–2026)	Peak position
Australian Albums (ARIA)	26
Belgian Albums (Ultratop Flanders)	158
Belgian Albums (Ultratop Wallonia)	154
Dutch Albums (Album Top 100)	40
German Albums (Offizielle Top 100)	43
New Zealand Albums (RMNZ)	31
Norwegian Physical Albums (IFPI Norge)	1
Swedish Physical Albums (Sverigetopplistan)	18
UK Album Downloads (Official Charts)	91
UK Album Sales (OCC)	34
UK Independent Album Breakers (OCC)	7
UK Independent Albums (Official Charts)	34
UK Physical Albums (OCC)	31
UK Record Store (OCC)	28
UK Scottish Albums (OCC)	20
UK Soundtrack Albums (Official Charts)	2
UK Vinyl Albums (OCC)	12
US Heatseekers Albums (Billboard)	16
US Independent Albums (Billboard)	45
US Top Album Sales (Billboard)	84
US Top Dance Albums (Billboard)	5
US Soundtrack Albums (Billboard)	4

==== Year-end charts ====
2023 year-end chart performance for Minecraft – Volume Alpha
Chart (2023)	Position
US Soundtrack Albums (Billboard)	25
US Top Dance/Electronic Albums (Billboard)	9

2024 year-end chart performance for Minecraft – Volume Alpha
Chart (2024)	Position
US Soundtrack Albums (Billboard)	20
US Top Dance/Electronic Albums (Billboard)	11

=== Volume Beta charts ===
2013 chart performance for Minecraft – Volume Beta
Chart (2013)	Peak position
US Top Dance/Electronic Albums (Billboard)	14

2020 chart performance for Minecraft – Volume Beta
Chart (2020)	Peak position
Official Record Store (OCC)	39
Official Independent Album Breakers (OCC)	15

2023–2026 chart performance for Minecraft – Volume Beta
Chart (2023–2026)	Peak position
Australian Albums (ARIA)	68
Austrian Albums (Ö3 Austria)	10
Belgian Albums (Ultratop Flanders)	178
UK Independent Albums (Official Charts)	49
US Soundtrack Albums (Billboard)	9
US Top Album Sales (Billboard)	78
US Top Dance/Electronic Albums (Billboard)	14
