= TIGSource =

Indie game blog and online community

- Website type: Blog/online community
- Available in: English
- Founded: 2005
- Creator: Jordan Magnuson
- Website: tigsource.com
- Commercial: no

TIGSource, short for The Independent Games Source, is a news blog and Internet community centered around the creation of independent video games, founded in 2005 by Jordan Magnuson but soon taken over by Derek Yu, both independent game developers. The site has been described as having been an important "cultural nexus" for the creation of indie games development in the 2000s and early 2010s, and a key player in changing the perception of independent video games as merely casual games to that of an art form. Its forums were the launchpad for several award-winning games, including the best-selling video game of all time, Minecraft, BAFTA-winning dystopian immigration officer simulation Papers, Please, viral phenomenon QWOP, puzzle-platform game Fez, and Yu's own Spelunky. The site was in 2009 referred to as "one of the primary sources of information about the indie scene on the web and host to one of indie's best forums, bringing creators and fans together to share novel new ideas and the greatest new games." In 2008, it was chosen as one of "100 top sites for the year ahead" by The Guardian.
