= Cube Creator 3D =

2015 video game

- Developer: Big John Games
- Publisher: Big John Games
- Platform: Nintendo 3DS
- Release: April 23, 2015
- Genre: Sandbox
- Modes: Single-player, multiplayer

Cube Creator 3D is a 2015 sandbox game developed and published by American studio Big John Games for the Nintendo 3DS on April 23, 2015. Gameplay lets the players explore a Minecraft-style game world. Cube Creator 3D received mostly positive reviews and has been cited as a Minecraft clone. Two sequels to Cube Creator 3D were made, Cube Creator DX and Cube Creator X.

== Gameplay ==
Gameplay screenshot; Cube Creator 3D was praised for its Minecraft-like experience.

Cube Creator 3D is a sandbox game set in a 3D environment that offers two game modes: Survival mode and Creative mode. It supports both the C-Stick of the New Nintendo 3DS and the Circle Pad Pro accessory for the Nintendo 3DS. In Survival mode, which incorporates build and combat mechanics, the player is pitted in a randomly generated world that spawns hostile mobs such as bears and mummies, which can be killed to obtain items. Biomes include forests, deserts, mountains, and snowy landscapes, between which the player can travel by entering a craftable portal. In Creative mode, players have access to all items and the ability to fly. In 2018, an update was released that added local multiplayer for two players and 3rd-person viewing.

== Release and reception ==
Cube Creator 3D was developed and published by American studio Big John Games for the Nintendo 3DS on April 23, 2015.

Cube Creator 3D received mostly positive reviews. While it was considered a Minecraft clone, critics praised the presence of a Minecraft-like experience to Nintendo, though they dinged it as having less depth. Mitch Vogel of NintendoLife said: "While it certainly does not approach the level of depth of [Minecraft], Cube Creator 3D's simple presentation offers enough that it successfully manages to capture the adventurous spirit that made its inspiration such a runaway success." Pierre Yves of Digitally Downloaded stated: "While not offering anything overly new, it gets the interface right and makes use of the hardware well." Bryan Rose of Nintendo World Report praised the creative mode for allowing the player to build their own environment, but found the survival mode less fun. Neal Ronaghan of IGN praised its low price.

In 2015, Big John Games confirmed that the game's demo version had been downloaded 250,000 times since its launch in December 2014. As of 2017, Cube Creator 3D has sold over 500,000 units worldwide.

== Sequels ==
Two sequels to Cube Creator 3D were made, entitled Cube Creator DX (2018) and Cube Creator X (2019), for the Nintendo Switch; Japanese publisher Arc System Works acquired publishing rights to the series. Cube Creator X was released on Windows in 2019.

== See also ==
- Total Miner — the second Minecraft-inspired video game on XBLIG
- CastleMiner — the third such game on XBLIG
- FortressCraft — another such game on XBLIG
