= Kristoffer Zetterstrand =

Swedish artist (born 1973)

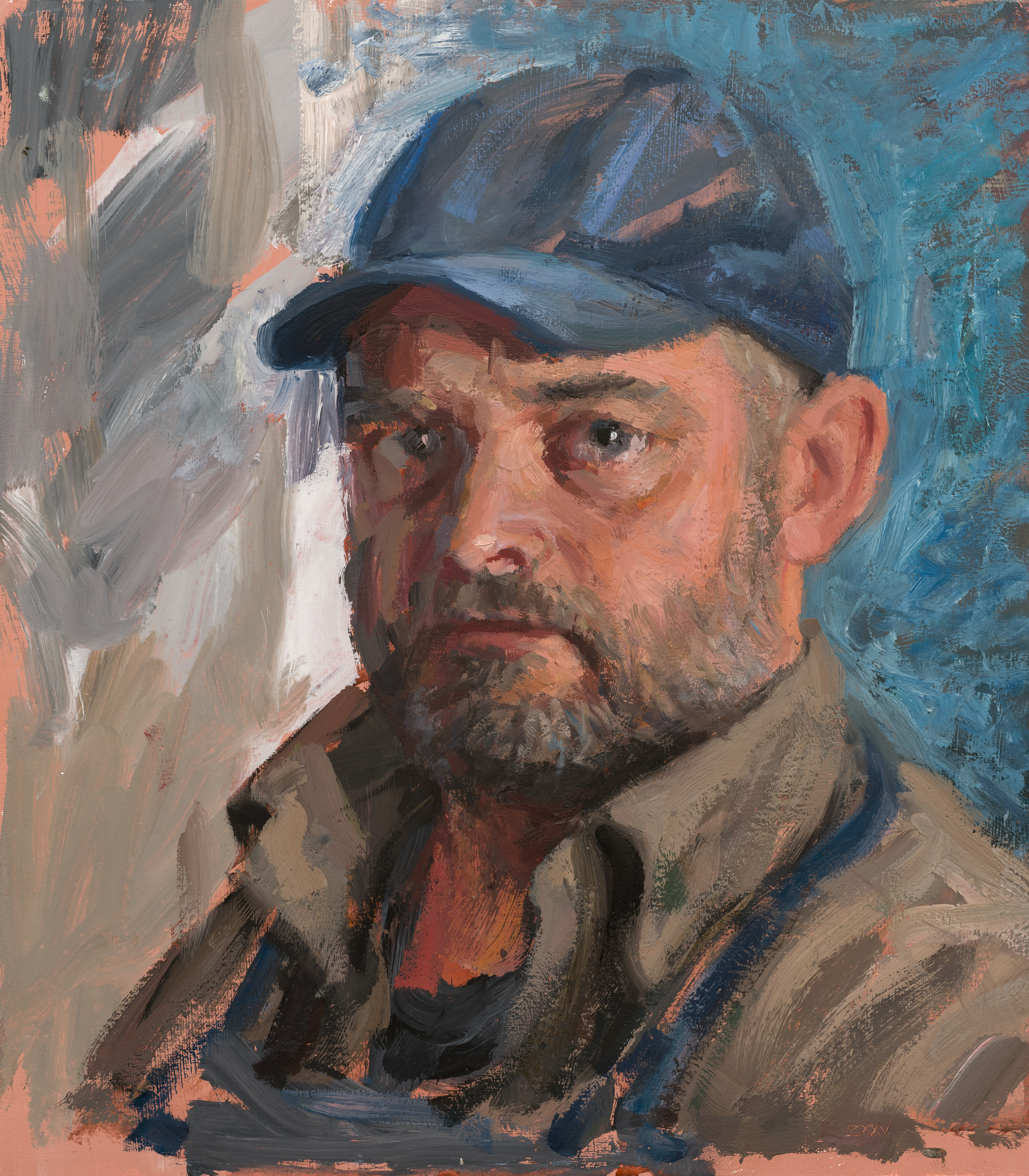
- Self-portrait, 2025
- Born: 27 September 1973 (age 52); Stockholm, Sweden
- Website: zetterstrand.com

Kristoffer Zetterstrand (born 27 September 1973) is a Swedish artist, known for creating most of the paintings featured in the video game Minecraft and being the brother of Elin Zetterstrand, Markus Persson's ex-wife.

== Education and work ==
Kristoffer Zetterstrand studied at Royal University College of Fine Arts in Stockholm and at Complutense University of Madrid in Spain. Zetterstrand's works are influenced by both classical and Renaissance artwork, as well as computer graphics and 3D modeling. His debut exhibition in 2002 consisted of compilations for the video game Counter-Strike. In 2010, Markus Persson, Zetterstrand's former brother-in-law, included some of Zetterstrand's paintings in his game Minecraft, a sandbox and survival game inspired by Infiniminer. Since then, these paintings have become an iconic part of the game. In June 2024, Mojang Studios collaborated with Zetterstrand to add fifteen more paintings to Minecraft in commemoration of the game's fifteenth anniversary. His paintings are often based on virtual still lifes and scenography sculpted in 3D applications, and he has broadened his sources of images to include vintage photography and imagery.

== Awards ==
In 2008, Zetterstrand received the IASPIS artist in residency grant. In 2012, he received the Marianne & Sigvard Bernadotte Art Award. In 2013, he was awarded the Stora Kakelpriset, an annual prize for the most innovative use of tiles or ceramics in construction in Sweden, for his mosaic Ager Medicinae (The Medical Landscape). The work is 340 square metres (3,700 sq ft) in size and was commissioned for the exterior of the parking garage at New Karolinska University Hospital in Solna. It depicts a rough timeline of the development of medicine in pixellated style.

== Gallery ==
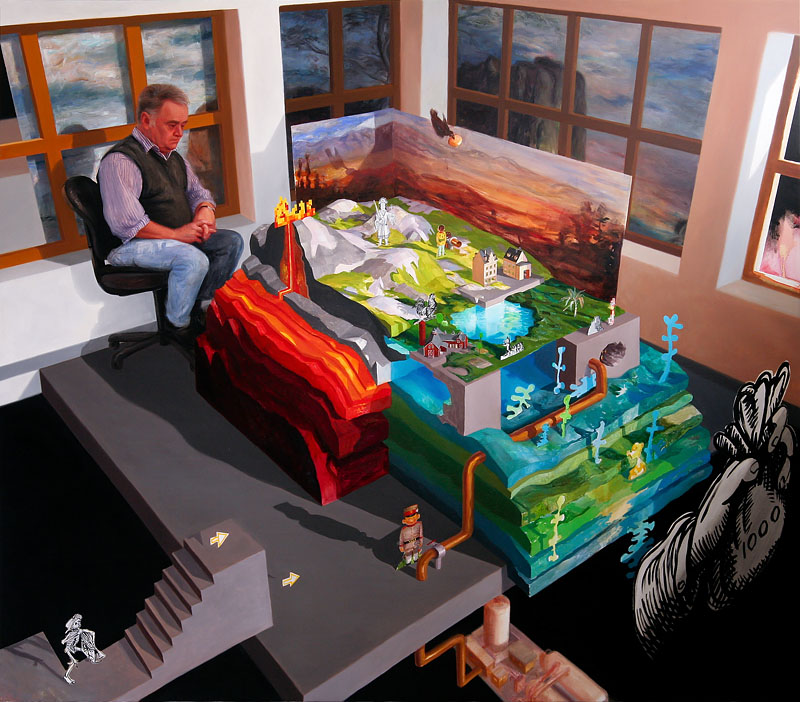
The game, 2009

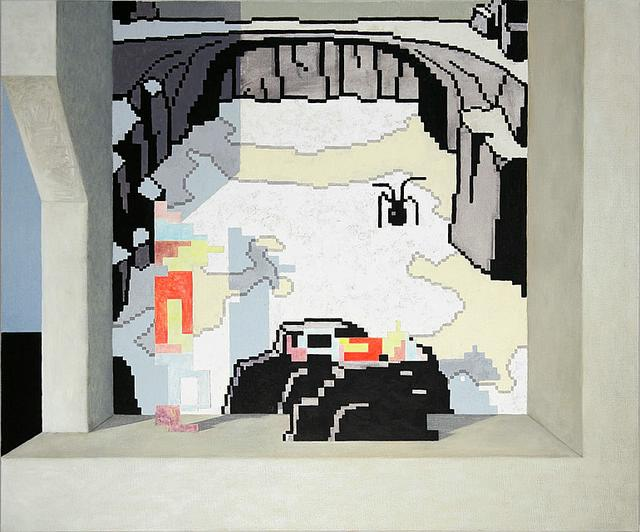
The stage is set, 2006

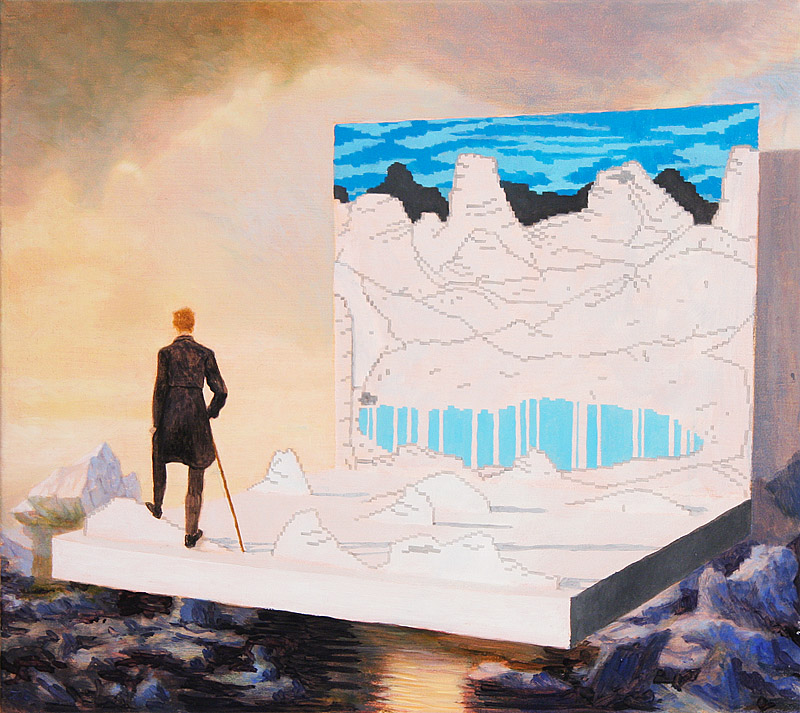
Wanderer, 2008

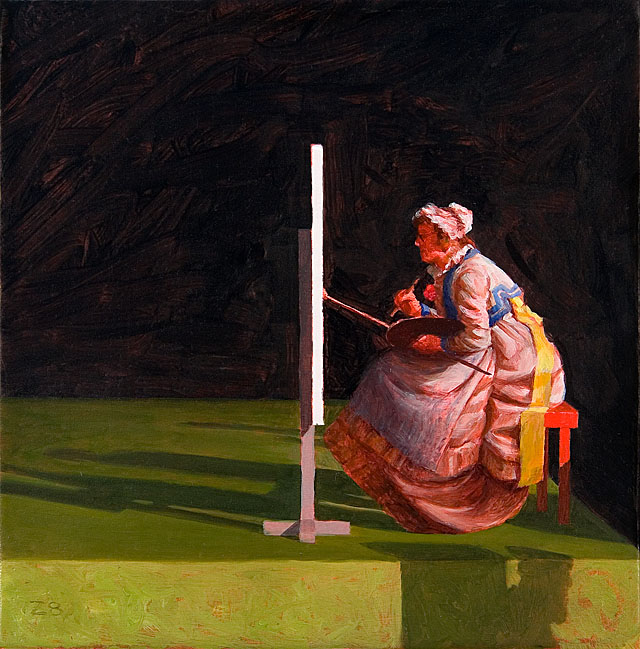
The master, 2008

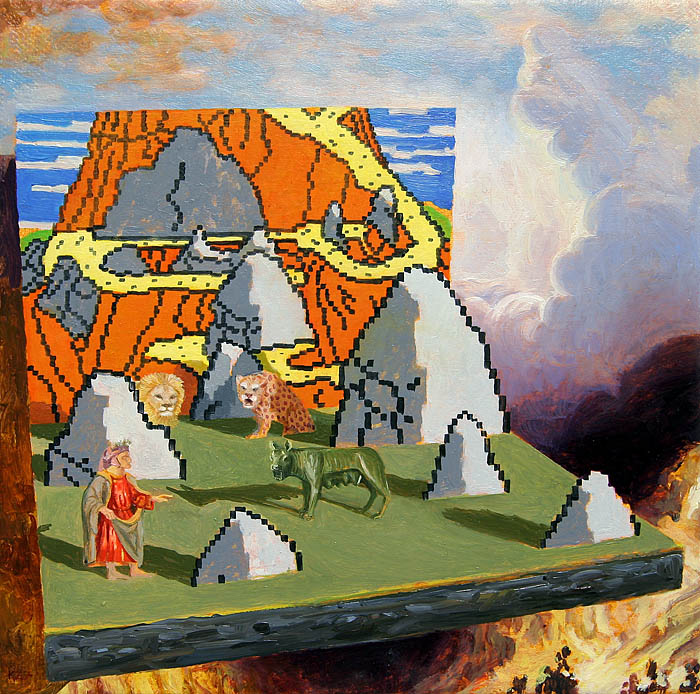
Dante and the three beasts, 2007

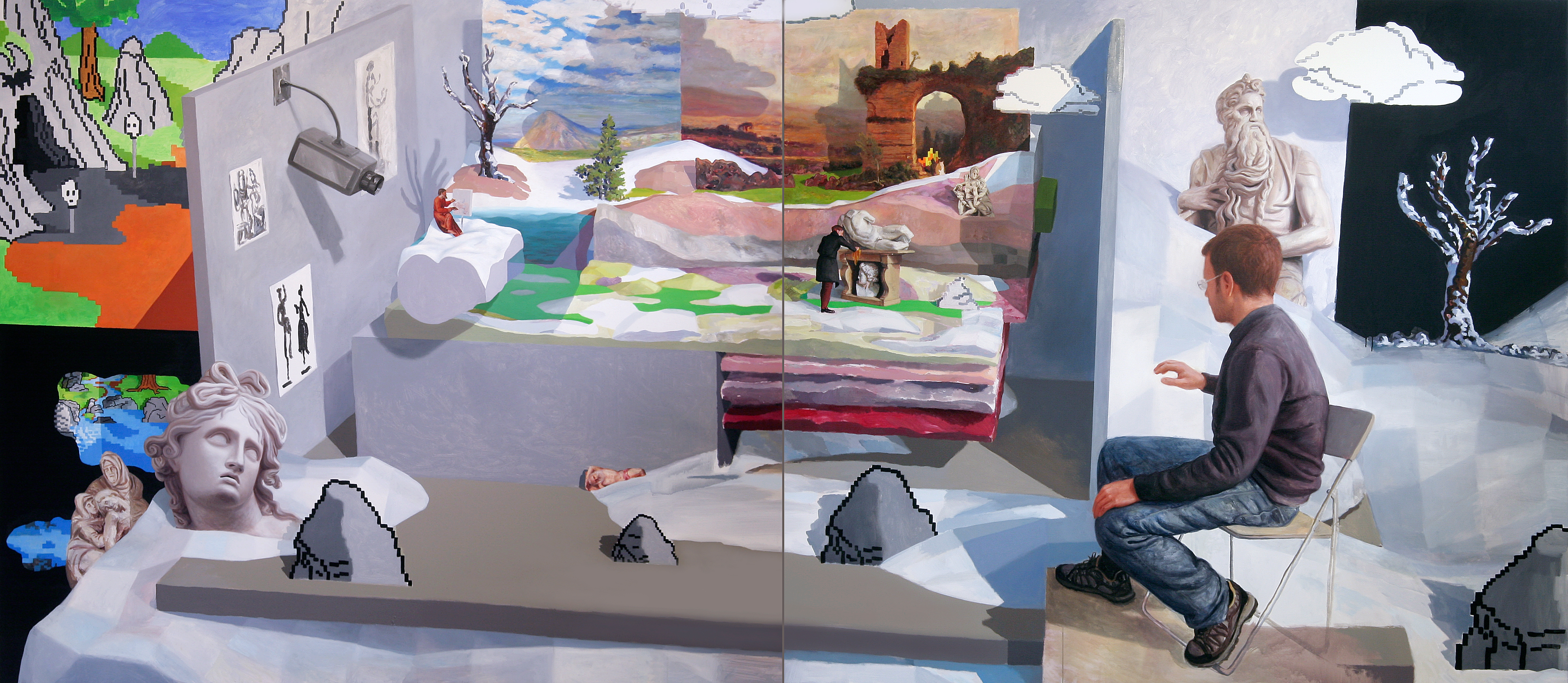
Thawing, 2008

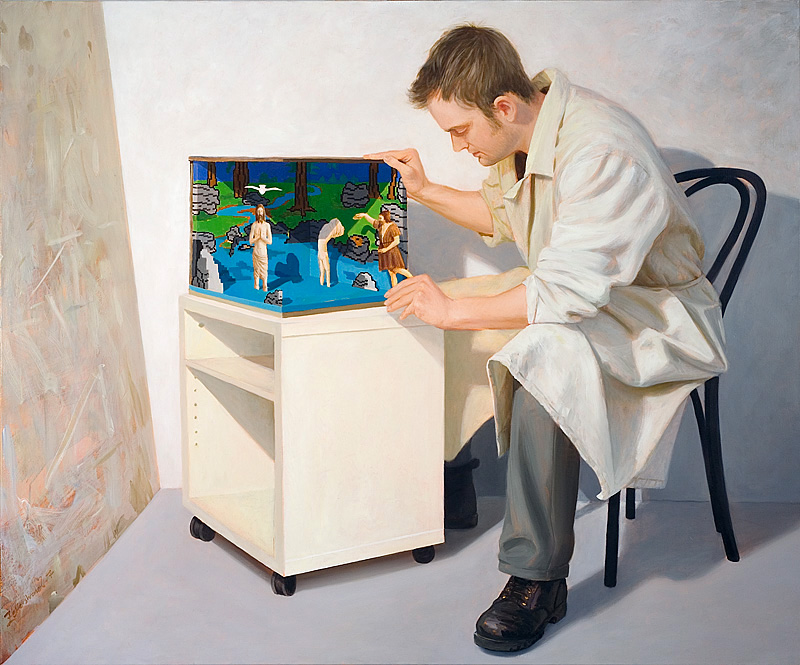
Artist and still life, 2007

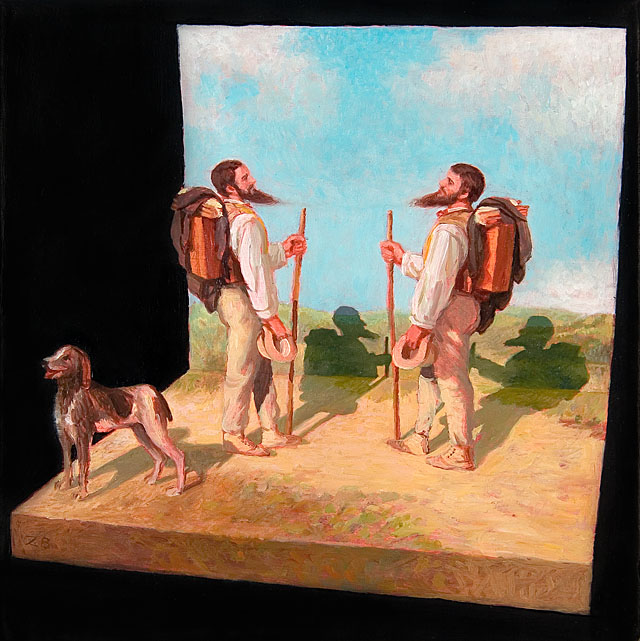
Bonjour Monsieur Courbet, 2008

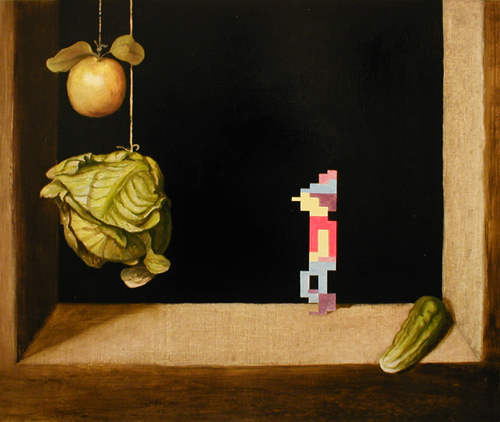
Graham, 2003

== Further information ==
- Jansson, Mathias (March 24, 2010). "Interview: From traditional painting to Game Art: Kristoffer Zetterstrand". Gamescenes.
- Jansson, Mathias (January 19, 2012). "Kristoffer Zetterstrand: King of Old School". Art21 magazine.
- "Pixels and Painting: Artist Talk with Kristoffer Zetterstrand". The Art of Video Games Webcasts. Art Babble, Indianapolis Museum of Art. September 7, 2012. (video, 1:06:50)
- Zetterstrand, Kristoffer; Håkan Nilsson (text) (2009). Virtual Artifacts: Works 2002–2009. Bandhagen: Biondi. ISBN 9789197442251.
