= Minecraft =

2011 video game

- Logo used since 2021
- Developer: Mojang Studios (Note: The original versions of the game for consoles (known as legacy console editions) were developed by 4J Studios. Additional studios responsible for helping develop specific versions of the game include Xbox Game Studios Advanced Technology Group and SkyBox Labs for the Bedrock Edition, Other Ocean Interactive for the version on New Nintendo 3DS, and NetEase for the localized version released in mainland China.)
- Publisher: Mojang Studios (Note: The PlayStation 3 version was published by Sony Interactive Entertainment, while the localized version of the game in mainland China is published by NetEase.)
- Designers: Markus Persson (Note: Left Mojang Studios in 2014); Jens Bergensten
- Artists: Markus Toivonen; Jasper Boerstra; Kristoffer Zetterstrand
- Composer: C418 (Note: With later contributions from Lena Raine, Kumi Tanioka, Aaron Cherof, Amos Roddy, and Paula "fingerspit" Ruiz. Gareth Coker composed music for downloadable content in the legacy console editions.)
- Series: Minecraft
- Engine: LWJGL (Java Edition); Proprietary engine (Bedrock Edition)
- Platforms: List: Windows; macOS; Linux; Android; iOS; iPadOS; Xbox 360; Raspberry Pi; Windows Phone; PlayStation 3; Fire OS; PlayStation 4; Xbox One; PlayStation Vita; Wii U; tvOS; Nintendo Switch; New Nintendo 3DS; ChromeOS; PlayStation 5; Xbox Series X/S; Nintendo Switch 2
- Release: 18 November 2011: Linux, Mac OS X, Windows; 17 May 2009 (public alpha) (Note: Minecraft was first publicly available on 17 May 2009, and, following many developmental phases over the next two years, was fully released on 18 November 2011.); Android; 7 October 2011 (public alpha) (Note: Minecraft's Pocket Edition was released in Alpha on 7 October 2011. Its full release with version 1.0.0 was on 19 December 2016.); iOS; 17 November 2011 (public alpha); Linux, Mac OS X, Windows; WW: 18 November 2011; Xbox 360; WW: 9 May 2012; Raspberry Pi; WW: 11 February 2013; PlayStation 3; NA: 17 December 2013; EU: 18 December 2013; Fire OS; 2 April 2014 (public alpha); PlayStation 4; WW: 4 September 2014; Xbox One; WW: 5 September 2014; PlayStation Vita; NA: 14 October 2014; EU: 15 October 2014; Windows Phone; 10 December 2014 (public alpha); Windows 10; 29 July 2015 (public alpha) (Note: Minecraft's Windows 10 Edition, based on the mobile Pocket Edition, was released in Alpha on 29 July 2015. Its full release with version 1.0.0 was on 19 December 2016.); Wii U; WW: 17 December 2015; Android, iOS, Windows 10, Fire OS, Windows Phone, tvOS, Fire TV; WW: 19 December 2016; Nintendo Switch; NA: 11 May 2017; PAL: 12 May 2017; New Nintendo 3DS; WW: 13 September 2017; ChromeOS; WW: 8 June 2023; PlayStation 5; WW: 22 October 2024 (Note: A native version for PlayStation 5 was released as part of a game update on 22 October 2024. The game previously used the PlayStation 4's native version.); Xbox Series X/S; WW: 17 June 2025 (Note: A native version for Xbox Series X/S was released as part of a game update on 17 June 2025. The game previously used the Xbox One's native version.); Nintendo Switch 2; WW: 27 October 2026
- Genres: Sandbox, survival
- Modes: Single-player, multiplayer

Minecraft is a sandbox video game developed and published by the Swedish company Mojang Studios. Following its initial public alpha release as an early access title on 17 May 2009, it was formally released on 18 November 2011 for personal computers. The game has since been ported to numerous platforms, including mobile devices and various video game consoles.

In Minecraft, players explore a procedurally generated world with virtually infinite terrain made up of three-dimensional blocks represented as voxels. They can discover and extract raw materials, craft tools and items, build structures, fight hostile mobs, and cooperate with or compete against other players in multiplayer. In addition, the game's large community offers a wide variety of user-generated content, such as modifications, servers, player skins, texture packs, and custom maps, which add new game mechanics and possibilities.

Originally created by Markus "Notch" Persson using the Java programming language, Jens "Jeb" Bergensten was handed control over the game's development following its full release. In November 2014, Mojang and the Minecraft intellectual property were purchased by Microsoft for US$2.5 billion; Xbox Game Studios holds the publishing rights for the Bedrock Edition, the unified cross-platform version which evolved from the Pocket Edition codebase (Note: Alongside the Pocket Edition for which it was originally developed, this codebase was also used for the Windows 10 Edition, Gear VR Edition, and Fire TV Edition, all of which were rebranded as Bedrock Edition following the "Better Together Update" released in 2017.) and replaced the legacy console editions. Bedrock is updated concurrently with Mojang's original and PC-exclusive Java Edition, although with numerous, generally small, differences.

Minecraft is the best-selling video game of all time (Note: Some sources consider Tetris to be the best-selling video game by combining the sales of all of its different versions while others exclude it because they consider it a video game series rather than a stand-alone video game.) with over 400 million copies sold. It has received critical acclaim, winning several awards and being cited as one of the best video games ever made. Social media, parodies, adaptations, merchandise, and annual Minecon conventions have played prominent roles in popularizing it. A film adaptation, titled A Minecraft Movie, was released in 2025 and became the second highest-grossing video game film at the time of its release.

== Gameplay ==
Minecraft is a three-dimensional (3D) sandbox video game played in discrete, persistent instances called "worlds". These worlds are composed of rough 3D objects—mainly cubes, referred to as blocks—arranged in a voxel grid and representing various materials, such as dirt, stone, ores, wood logs, water, and lava. The core gameplay revolves around picking up and placing these blocks: players can move freely around the world, breaking, or mining, blocks and then placing them elsewhere to build structures. Most blocks are not affected by gravity, instead maintaining their voxel position in the air. Minecraft has no required goals to accomplish, giving players a large amount of freedom in choosing how to play the game, though an optional achievement system is included. Gameplay is in the first-person perspective by default, but players have the option of third-person perspectives (back and front).

Players can craft a wide variety of items, including armor, which mitigates damage from attacks; weapons—such as swords or bows and arrows—which make it easier to kill monsters and animals; and tools—such as pickaxes or shovels—which break certain types of blocks more quickly. Some items have multiple tiers based on the material used to craft them, with higher-tier items being more effective and durable. Players may also craft functional blocks, such as furnaces, which cook food and smelt ores, and torches, which produce light. Additionally, players can trade with villagers (NPCs), exchanging emeralds for various goods. The game has an inventory system, allowing players to carry a limited number of items. The game's time system follows a day and night cycle, with one full cycle lasting 20 real-time minutes. The game also features a material called redstone, which can be used to build primitive mechanical devices, electrical circuits, and logic gates, enabling the construction of complex systems.

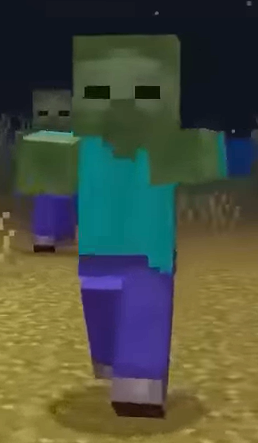
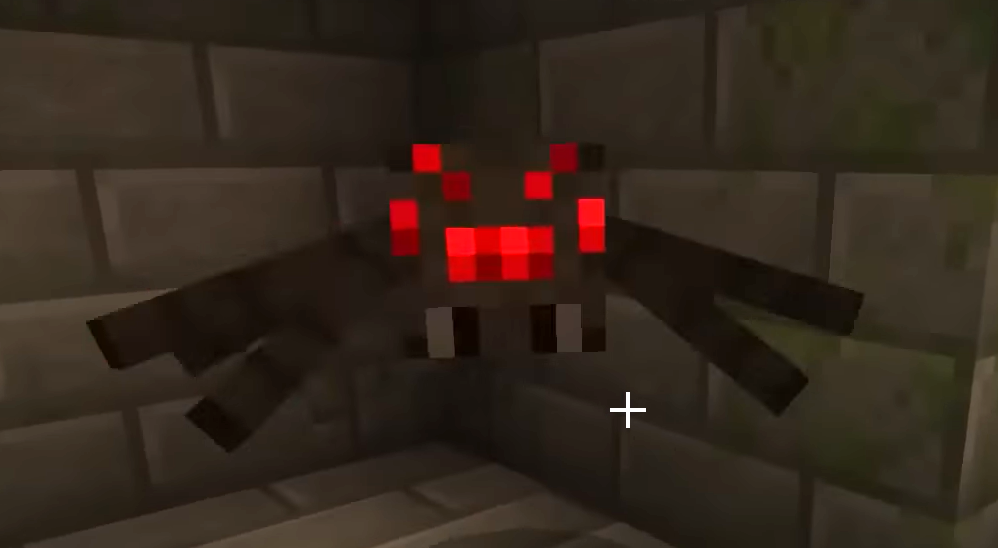
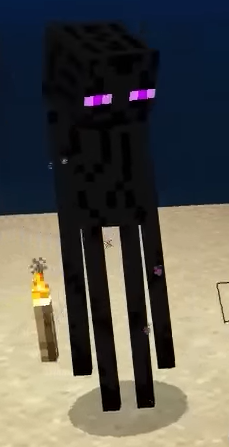
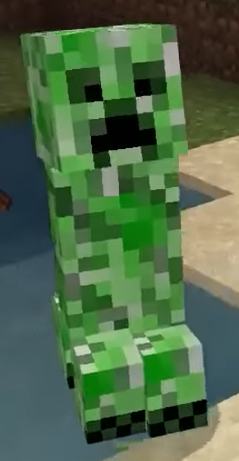
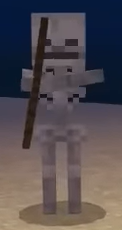
Some of Minecraft's hostile mobs, displayed from left to right: a zombie, a spider, an enderman, a creeper, and a skeleton. All can spawn in the Overworld.

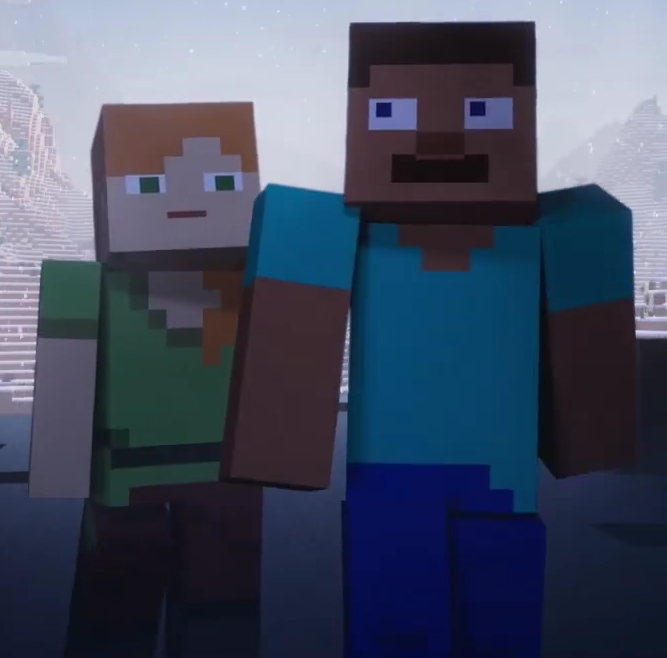
Alex and Steve as they appear in the "Caves and Cliffs: Part II" update trailer

New players are given a randomly selected default character skin out of nine possibilities, including Steve or Alex, but are able to create and upload their own skins. Players encounter various mobs (mobile entities) including animals, villagers, and hostile creatures. Passive mobs, such as cows, pigs, and chickens, spawn during the daytime and can be hunted for food and crafting materials, while hostile mobs—including large spiders, witches, skeletons, and zombies—spawn during nighttime or in dark places such as caves. Other creatures unique to Minecraft include the creeper (an exploding creature that sneaks up on the player) and the enderman (a creature with the ability to teleport as well as pick up and place blocks). There are also variants of mobs that spawn in different conditions; for example, zombies have husk and drowned variants that spawn in deserts and oceans, respectively.

=== Generation ===
The Minecraft environment is procedurally generated as players explore it using a map seed that is randomly chosen at the time of world creation (or manually specified by the player). Divided into biomes representing different environments with unique resources and structures, worlds are designed to be effectively infinite in traditional gameplay, though technical limits on the player have existed throughout development, both intentionally and not.

Implementation of horizontally infinite generation initially resulted in a glitch termed the "Far Lands" at over 12 million blocks away from the world center, where terrain generated as wall-like, fissured patterns. The Far Lands and associated glitches were considered the effective edge of the world until they were resolved, with the current horizontal limit instead being a special impassable barrier located 30 million blocks away in each direction. Vertical space is comparatively limited, with an unbreakable bedrock layer at the bottom and a building limit several hundred blocks into the sky.

==== Dimensions ====
Minecraft features three independent dimensions accessible through portals and providing alternate game environments. The Overworld is the starting dimension and represents the real world, with a terrestrial surface setting that includes plains, mountains, forests, oceans, caves, and small sources of lava.

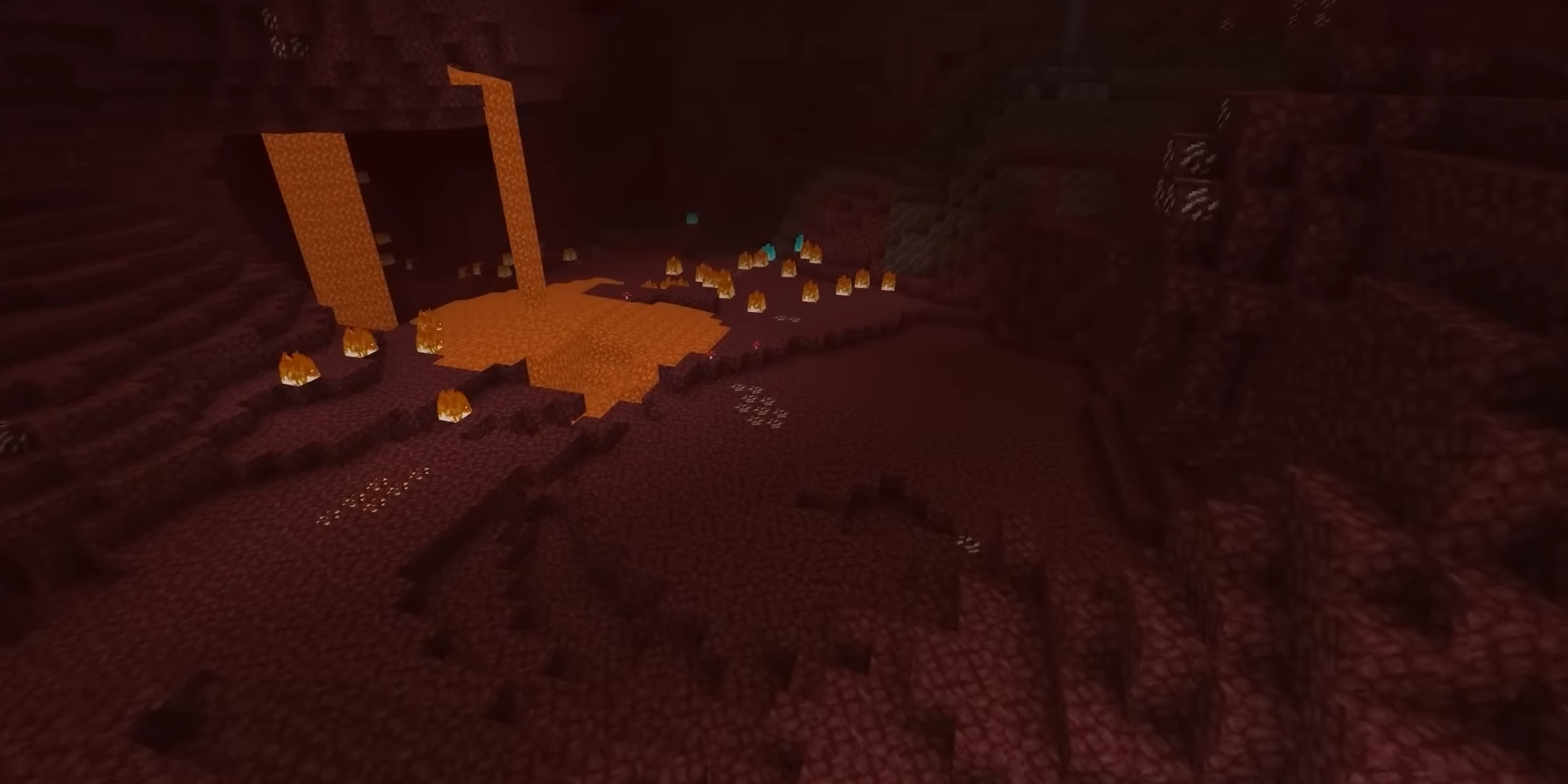
Flowing lava in the Nether

The Nether is a hell-like underworld dimension accessed via an obsidian portal and composed mainly of lava. Mobs that populate the Nether include shrieking, fireball-shooting ghasts, alongside anthropomorphic pigs called piglins and their zombified counterparts. Piglins have a bartering system, allowing players to trade gold ingots for various items. Structures called Nether fortresses generate in the Nether, containing mobs such as wither skeletons and blazes; blazes can drop blaze rods, which are needed to access the End dimension. Players can also choose to summon an optional boss mob known as the Wither, using a Nether block called "soul sand" and skulls obtained from wither skeletons.

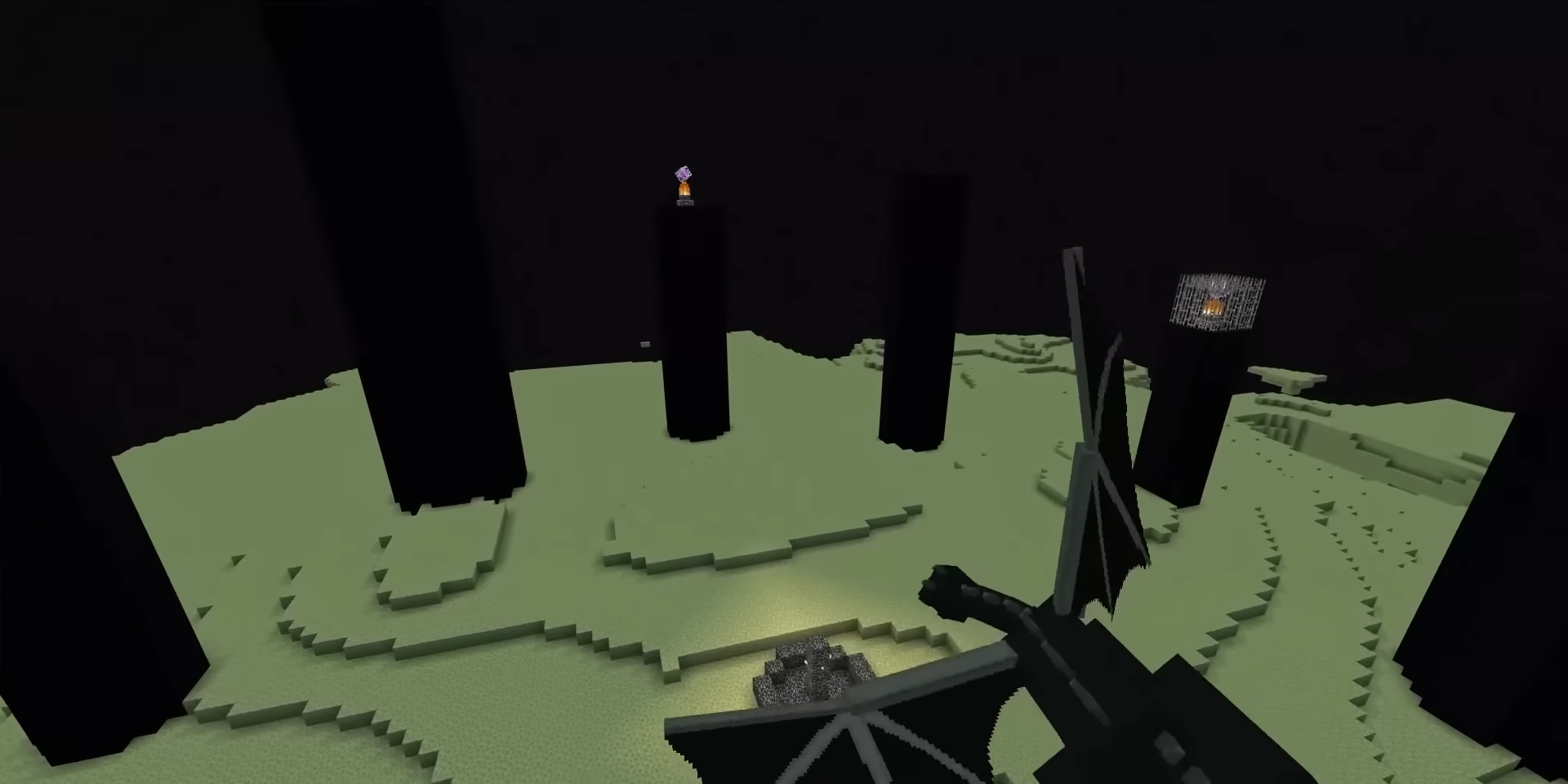
The Ender Dragon flying around towers in the End

The End can be reached through an End portal, which consists of twelve end portal frames. End portals are found in underground structures in the Overworld called strongholds. To locate a stronghold, players must craft eyes of ender from an ender pearl (the loot the enderman drops upon death) and blaze powder; when thrown, an eye of ender travels toward the nearest stronghold. Once there, the player activates the end portal by placing eyes of ender into each of its frames. The End itself consists of islands floating in a dark, bottomless void, with a boss enemy called the Ender Dragon guarding the largest, central island. Killing the dragon opens an exit portal; entering it triggers the game's ending credits, followed by the End Poem—a roughly 1,500-word text written by Irish novelist Julian Gough that takes about nine minutes to scroll past. It is the game's only narrative text and the only text of significant length directed at the player. After the credits finish, the player is returned to their respawn point and may continue playing indefinitely.

In September 2026, it was announced that a new dimension named "The Sift" is coming to Java and Bedrock Edition in 2027.

=== Game modes ===
==== Survival mode ====
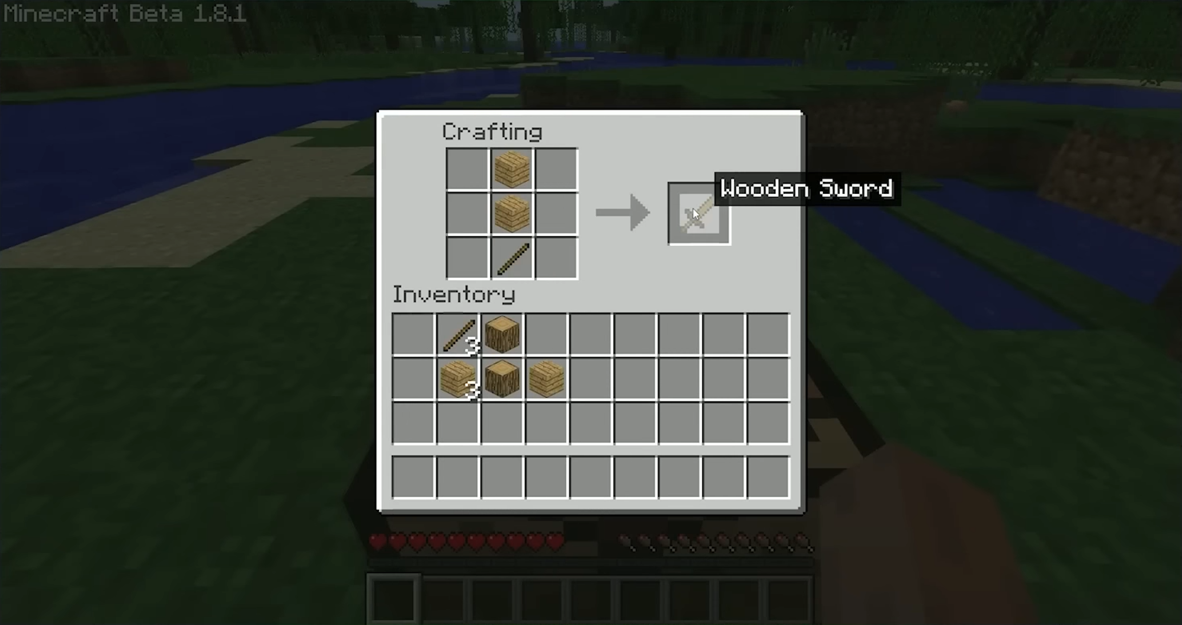
The crafting menu in Minecraft, showing the crafting recipe of a wooden sword as well as some other blocks and items in the player's inventory

In Survival mode, players gather natural resources such as wood and stone to craft blocks and items. Depending on the difficulty setting, monsters spawn in darker areas outside a radius of the character, requiring players to build shelter to survive at night. The mode has a health bar that depletes from mob attacks, falls, drowning, burning, suffocation, starvation, and other hazards, while a hunger bar must be periodically refilled by eating unless playing on peaceful difficulty. At 6 units or lower on the hunger bar, players can no longer sprint, at zero they starve, and at 18 or higher, health passively regenerates.

Losing all health kills the player, dropping their inventory items unless the game is reconfigured otherwise, and respawning them at their spawn point, which is, by default, set at the place where players first spawn in the world, but which can be changed by sleeping in a bed, using a respawn anchor, or via commands. Dropped items can be recovered within five minutes before they despawn. Players earn experience points ("xp" or "exp") by killing mobs, mining, smelting ores, breeding animals, and cooking, which can be spent on enchanting tools, armor, and weapons for added power, durability, or special effects.

Two related modes build on Survival: Hardcore mode locks the difficulty setting to "Hard" and adds permadeath, forcing players to delete the world or continue as a spectator after dying. Adventure mode, added in a post-launch update, prevents players from modifying the world directly and was designed for custom maps, letting designers control how players experience them.

==== Creative mode ====
In Creative mode, players have access to an infinite number of almost all resources and items in the game through the inventory menu and can place or mine them instantly. Players can toggle the ability to fly freely around the game world at will, and their characters usually do not take any damage nor are affected by hunger. The game mode helps players focus on building and creating projects of any size without disturbance.

=== Multiplayer ===
Multiplayer in Minecraft enables multiple players to interact and communicate with each other on a single world. It is available through direct game-to-game multiplayer, local area network (LAN) play, local split screen (console-only), and servers (player-hosted and business-hosted). Players can run their own server by making a realm, using a host provider, hosting one themselves or, connecting directly to another player's game via Xbox Live, PlayStation Network or Nintendo Switch Online. Single-player worlds have LAN support, allowing players to join a world on locally interconnected computers without a server setup. Minecraft multiplayer servers are guided by server operators, who have access to server commands such as setting the time of day and teleporting players. Operators can also set up restrictions concerning which usernames or IP addresses are allowed or disallowed to enter the server. Multiplayer servers have a wide range of activities, with some servers having their own unique rules and customs. The largest and most popular server is Hypixel, which has been visited by over 14 million unique players. Player versus player combat (PvP) can be disabled to prevent fighting between players.

==== Minecraft Realms ====
In 2013, Mojang announced Minecraft Realms, a server hosting service intended to enable players to run server multiplayer games easily and safely without having to set up their own. Unlike a standard server, only invited players can join Realms servers, and these servers do not use server addresses. Minecraft: Java Edition Realms server owners can invite an unlimited number of users to play on their server, with up to ten players online at a time. Minecraft Bedrock Realms server owners can invite up to 10,000 people to play on their server, with up to fifty players online at one time. The Minecraft: Java Edition Realms servers do not support user-made plugins, but players can play custom Minecraft maps. Minecraft Bedrock Realms servers support user-made add-ons, resource packs, behavior packs, and custom Minecraft maps. At Electronic Entertainment Expo 2016, support for cross-platform play between Windows 10, iOS, and Android platforms was added through Realms starting in June 2016, with Xbox One and Nintendo Switch support to come later in 2017, and support for virtual reality devices. On 31 July 2017, Mojang released the beta version of the update allowing cross-platform play. Nintendo Switch support for Realms was released in July 2018.

=== Modification ===
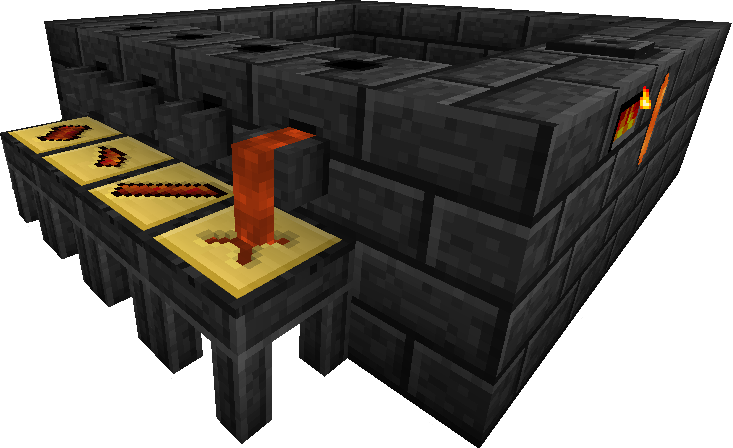
A smeltery within the mod Tinkers' Construct

The Minecraft modding community, made up of fans and third-party programmers, has used various application program interfaces to produce a wide range of modifications to the game's code (called mods), texture packs, and custom maps. Mods range from small gameplay tweaks to complex mechanical systems, such as the Factorio-like Create mod, and community mods commonly add conveniences like mini-maps, waypoints, and durability counters, or import elements from other games and media. While many mod frameworks arose from reverse-engineering the game's code, Mojang has also released official frameworks supporting community-made resource packs that alter textures and sounds. Players can also build and share custom "maps" (custom world save files) with their own rules, challenges, and quests; Mojang supported this with an adventure mode in August 2012 and "command blocks" in October 2012, both built for custom maps in Java Edition, and later with data packs in version 1.13, which allow custom achievements, dimensions, loot tables, recipes, structures, and world generation.

The Xbox 360 Edition supported downloadable content via the Xbox Games Store, mostly additional character skins, and its twelfth title update added texture packs and "mash-up packs" combining skins, textures, and changes to sound, music, and user interface; the first, released 4 September 2013, was themed after Mass Effect. Unlike Java Edition, it did not support player-made mods or custom maps. A Super Mario-themed resource pack launched exclusively for Wii U Edition on 17 May 2016 and was later bundled with Nintendo Switch Edition, followed by a Fallout-themed pack on consoles that December and on Windows and mobile in April 2017. In April 2018, malware was found in several downloadable Java Edition skins, infecting nearly 50,000 accounts according to Avast and attempting to reformat users' hard drives when activated; Mojang patched the issue, stating that "the code would not be run or read by the game itself", and would run only when the image containing the skin itself was opened.

==== Marketplace ====
In June 2017, Mojang released the "1.1 Discovery Update" to the Pocket Edition of the game, which later became the Bedrock Edition. The update introduced the "Marketplace", a catalogue of purchasable user-generated content intended to give Minecraft creators "another way to make a living from the game". Various skins, maps, texture packs and add-ons from different creators can be bought with "Minecoins", a digital currency that is purchased with real money. Additionally, users can access specific content with a subscription service titled "Marketplace Pass". Alongside content from independent creators, the Marketplace also houses items published by Mojang and Microsoft themselves, as well as official collaborations between Minecraft and other intellectual properties. By 2022, the Marketplace had over 1.7 billion content downloads, generating over $500 million in revenue.

== Development ==
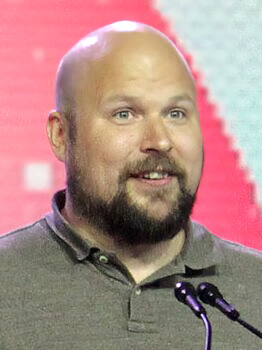
Minecraft creator Markus "Notch" Persson at the GDC in 2016

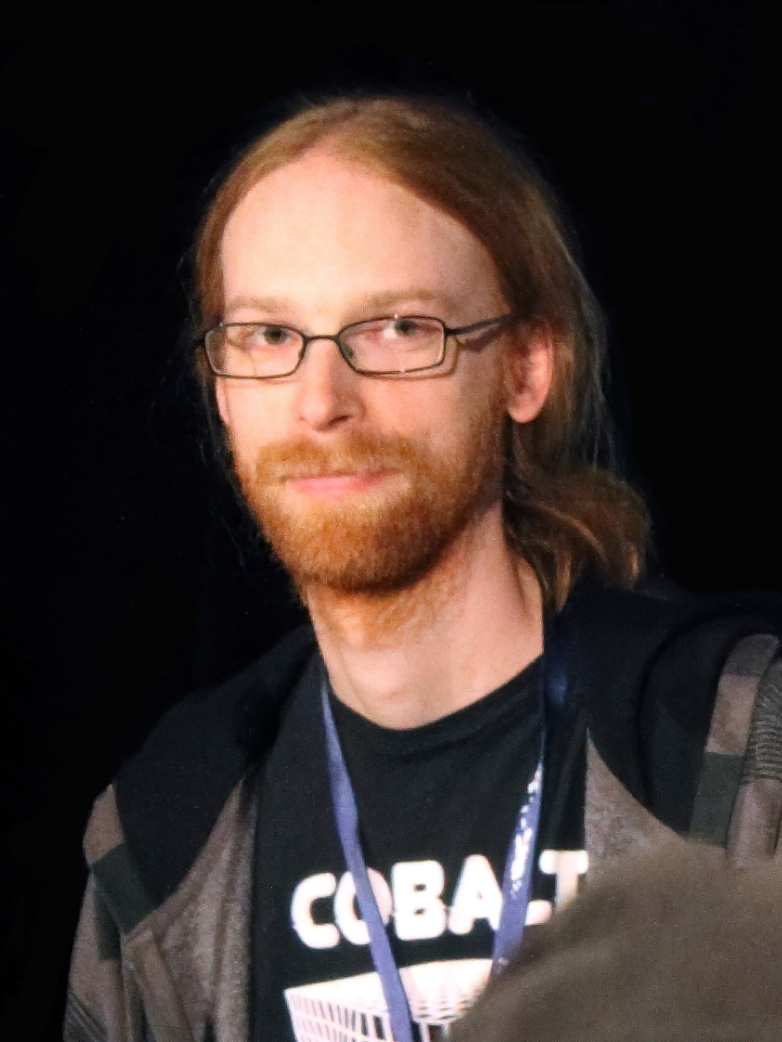
Minecraft lead designer and creative director Jens "Jeb" Bergensten in 2012

Before creating Minecraft, Markus "Notch" Persson was a game developer at King, where he worked until March 2009. At King, he primarily developed browser games and learned several programming languages. During his free time, he prototyped his own games, often drawing inspiration from other titles, and was an active participant on the TIGSource forums for independent developers.

One such project was RubyDung, a base-building game inspired by Dwarf Fortress, but with an isometric, three-dimensional perspective similar to RollerCoaster Tycoon. Among the features in RubyDung that he explored was a first-person view similar to Dungeon Keeper, though he ultimately discarded this idea, feeling the graphics were too pixelated at the time. Around March 2009, Persson left King and joined jAlbum, while continuing to work on his prototypes. Infiniminer, a block-based open-ended mining game first released in April 2009, inspired Persson's vision for RubyDung's future direction. Infiniminer heavily influenced the visual style of gameplay, including bringing back the first-person mode, the "blocky" visual style and the block-building fundamentals. However, unlike Infiniminer, Persson wanted Minecraft to have role-playing game (RPG) elements.

The first public alpha build of Minecraft was released on 17 May 2009 on TIGSource. On 1 December 2011, Persson stepped down from development, handing the project's lead to Jens "Jeb" Bergensten. On 15 September 2014, Microsoft, the developer behind the Microsoft Windows operating system and Xbox video game console, announced a $2.5 billion acquisition of Mojang, which included the Minecraft intellectual property. Persson had suggested the deal on Twitter, asking a corporation to buy his stake in the game after receiving criticism for enforcing terms in the game's end-user license agreement (EULA), which had been in place for the past three years. According to Persson, Mojang CEO Carl Manneh received a call from a Microsoft executive shortly after the tweet, asking if Persson was serious about a deal. Mojang was also approached by other companies including Activision Blizzard and Electronic Arts. The deal with Microsoft was arbitrated on 6 November 2014 and led to Persson becoming one of Forbes' "World's Billionaires".

On 16 April 2020, a Bedrock Edition-exclusive beta version of Minecraft, called Minecraft RTX, was released by Nvidia. It introduced physically-based rendering, real-time path tracing, and DLSS for RTX-enabled GPUs. The public release was made available on 8 December 2020. Path tracing can only be enabled in supported worlds, which can be downloaded for free via the in-game Minecraft Marketplace, with a texture pack from Nvidia's website, or with compatible third-party texture packs. It cannot be enabled by default with any texture pack on any world. Initially, Minecraft RTX was affected by many bugs, display errors, and instability issues. On 22 March 2025, a new visual mode called Vibrant Visuals, an optional graphical overhaul similar to Minecraft RTX, was announced. It promises modern rendering features—such as dynamic shadows, screen space reflections, volumetric fog, and bloom—without the need of RTX-capable hardware. Vibrant Visuals was released as a part of the Chase the Skies update on 17 June 2025 for Bedrock Edition and is planned to release on Java Edition at a later date.

=== Variants ===
Around 2011, prior to Minecraft's full release, Mojang collaborated with the Lego Group to create a Lego brick-based Minecraft game called Brickcraft. This would have modified the base Minecraft game to use Lego bricks, which meant adapting the basic 1×1 block to account for larger pieces typically used in Lego sets. Persson worked on an early version called "Project Rex Kwon Do", named after the character of the same name from the film Napoleon Dynamite. Although Lego approved the project and Mojang assigned two developers for six months, it was canceled due to the Lego Group's demands, according to Mojang's Daniel Kaplan. Lego considered buying Mojang to complete the game, but when Microsoft offered over $2 billion for the company, Lego stepped back, unsure of Minecraft's potential. On 26 June 2025, a build of Brickcraft dated 28 June 2012 was published on a community archive website Omniarchive.

==== Virtual reality ====
Initially, Persson planned to support the Oculus Rift with a Minecraft port. However, after Facebook acquired Oculus in 2013, he abruptly canceled the plans, stating, "Facebook creeps me out". In 2016, a community-made mod, Minecraft VR, added VR support for Java Edition, followed by Vivecraft for HTC Vive. Later that year, Microsoft introduced official Oculus Rift support for Windows 10 Edition, leading to the discontinuation of the Minecraft VR mod due to trademark complaints. Vivecraft was endorsed by Minecraft VR contributors for its Rift support. Also available is a Gear VR version, titled Minecraft: Gear VR Edition. Windows Mixed Reality support was added in 2017. On 7 September 2020, Mojang Studios announced that the PlayStation 4 Bedrock version would receive PlayStation VR support later that month. In September 2024, the Minecraft team announced they would no longer support PlayStation VR, which received its final update in March 2025.

=== Music and sound design ===
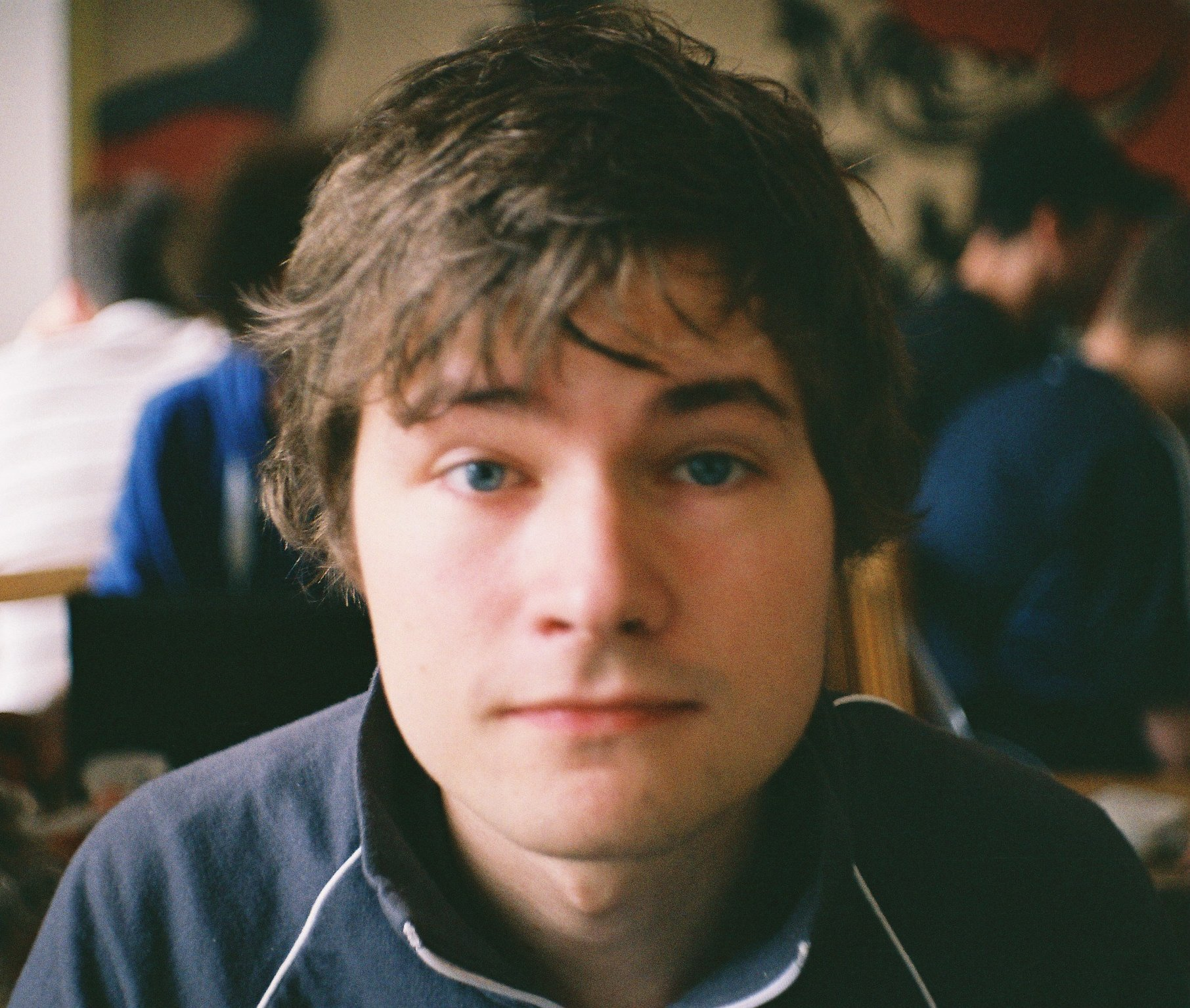
Minecraft music composer and sound designer Daniel "C418" Rosenfeld in 2011

Minecraft's music and sound effects were produced by German musician Daniel Rosenfeld, known as C418. Rosenfeld created the game's sound effects through extensive trial-and-error Foley work, later recalling that he had "no set way of doing anything at all". For grass, he found that actual recordings of walking on grass did not work and instead used lightly touched VHS tape. His favorite sound to design was the spider's screech, which he built by pitching a fire hose recording until it sounded "like a weird spider was talking to you". Several of Rosenfeld's sound choices were accidental. The creeper's fuse-like hiss began as a placeholder matchstick sound he made with Persson that "seemed to work hilariously well" and was kept, while the zombie's noises were intentionally made comical rather than frightening. Rosenfeld also described the game's early sound engine as "terrible" to work with, recalling that it would crash if two song files played at once.

The game's background music consists of instrumental ambient tracks, composed by Rosenfeld using Ableton Live alongside hardware synthesizers including a Moog Voyager, a Dave Smith Prophet 08, and a Virus TI. On creating the music, Rosenfeld said that "a lot of the music I make is repetitive by design". He wanted the game's music to induce relaxation or concentration, and he believed the randomness of the order in which the tracks play allowed players to do something and assign significance to that act: "They decide subconsciously that, 'Yeah, this moment is specifically made for me.' Which is fascinating!" He released the soundtrack album Minecraft – Volume Alpha on 4 March 2011, compiling most of the game's music alongside additional unused tracks. Kirk Hamilton of Kotaku later named it one of the best video game soundtracks of 2011. A second soundtrack, Minecraft – Volume Beta, followed on 9 November 2013, covering music added in that year's "Music Update". Indie label Ghostly International issued physical CD and vinyl releases of Volume Alpha in 2015 and Volume Beta in 2020.

C418's music remained the game's only score until Lena Raine's additions in 2020's Nether Update. Raine has since become the primary composer, joined by contributors including Kumi Tanioka, Samuel Åberg, Aaron Cherof, and Amos Roddy; Gareth Coker also composed music for downloadable content in the legacy console editions. Rosenfeld retains all ownership of his two independently released albums. Rosenfeld had stated his intent to create a third soundtrack for the game in 2015, and he confirmed its existence in a 2017 tweet, noting it already exceeded the combined length of the first two albums. Licensing complications with Microsoft have prevented its release; asked about it in a 2021 interview, Rosenfeld said he considered the work finished but was uncertain about its future given Minecraft's scale as a commercial property.

== Release ==
=== Java Edition ===
Java Edition major update release timeline Pre-release years in red
2009	Pre-Classic
2009	Classic
2009	Survival Test
2009	Indev
2010	Infdev
2010	Alpha
2010	Alpha v1.2.0 – v1.2.6: "Halloween Update"
2010	Beta
2011	Beta
2011	Beta 1.8: "Adventure Update"
2011	Release 1.0: "Adventure Update"
2012	1.1
2012	1.2
2012	1.3
2012	1.4: "Pretty Scary Update"
2013	1.5: "Redstone Update"
2013	1.6: "Horse Update"
2013	1.7.2: "The Update that Changed the World"
2014	1.8: "Bountiful Update"
2015
2016	1.9: "Combat Update"
2016	1.10: "Frostburn Update"
2016	1.11: "Exploration Update"
2017	1.12: "World of Colour Update"
2018	1.13: "Update Aquatic"
2019	1.14: "Village & Pillage"
2019	1.15: "Buzzy Bees"
2020	1.16: "Nether Update"
2021	1.17: "Caves & Cliffs: Part I"
2021	1.18: "Caves & Cliffs: Part II"
2022	1.19: "The Wild Update"
2023	1.20: "Trails & Tales"
2023	1.20.3: "Bats and Pots"
2024	1.20.5: "Armoured Paws"
2024	1.21: "Tricky Trials"
2024	1.21.2: "Bundles of Bravery"
2024	1.21.4: "The Garden Awakens"
2025	1.21.5: "Spring to Life"
2025	1.21.6: "Chase the Skies"
2025	1.21.9: "The Copper Age"
2025	1.21.11: "Mounts of Mayhem"
2026	26.1: "Tiny Takeover"
2026	26.2: "Chaos Cubed"
2026	26.3: "Wilderness Bound"
2026	26.4: "Deep Freeze"

Minecraft originated in May 2009 when Persson developed the first known versions of the game, then called Cave Game, featuring a world composed of grass and cobblestone blocks that could be placed and removed. The game was renamed Minecraft following its publication on the TIGSource forums, and Persson continued updating it based on community feedback in a phase later referred to as Classic, during which multiplayer capabilities and a survival mode featuring hostile monsters were introduced. Ambient music composed by C418 was also added during the Classic phase. The game entered the Indev phase on 23 December 2009, inheriting features from a branch of Classic called Survival Test and introducing paintings by artist Kristoffer Zetterstrand, before Persson began a new development branch called Infdev on 27 February 2010 to experiment with infinite worlds. Minecraft entered the Alpha phase on 30 June 2010, during which updates were frequent and spontaneous, and redstone—a material capable of transmitting signals to alter the state of various blocks—was introduced. Alpha v1.2.0, released on 30 October 2010, added biomes and the Nether.

Minecraft entered the Beta phase on 20 December 2010, with Beta 1.0 introducing throwable eggs and leaf decay. Beta 1.8, released on 14 September 2011 and titled the Adventure Update, reworked world generation by adding new biomes, structures, and terrain features including ravines, and overhauled player movement and combat by introducing sprinting, critical hits, and a hunger bar that replaced direct food healing. Beta 1.8 also added creative mode. The first full release, version 1.0.0, was officially released on 18 November 2011, adding several changes, including the End and the Ender Dragon. Version 1.3, released on 1 August 2012, introduced villager trading and emerald currency and merged the single-player and multiplayer codebases. Version 1.8, the Bountiful Update released on 2 September 2014, was followed by a period with no major updates until February 2016 due to Microsoft's acquisition of Mojang AB and Persson's departure from the company.

The Combat Update, version 1.9, released on 29 February 2016, introduced a weapon cooldown system, dual wielding, a shield item, and an expansion of the End dimension including end cities and equippable elytra for aerial gliding. Version 1.13, the Update Aquatic released on 18 July 2018, overhauled oceans by adding biomes, coral reefs, shipwrecks, fish as living mobs, and new underwater creatures including the Drowned. The Caves & Cliffs update was split into two parts, released in June and November 2021 respectively, with Part I introducing new mobs and materials including copper blocks that oxidize over time, and Part II increasing the world height from 256 to 384 blocks and reworking terrain generation with expanded caves and taller mountains. Version 1.20, Trails & Tales, released on 7 June 2023 and introduced archaeology, allowing players to excavate items from the ground using a brush. In September 2023, Mojang announced a shift from major annual updates to more frequently released game drops, with drops under this process adding features including trial chamber dungeons in version 1.21, bundle inventory items in version 1.21.2, and the pale garden biome with a new hostile mob called the Creaking in version 1.21.4.

In December 2025, Mojang announced that beginning in 2026, Minecraft's version numbering scheme would be changed for ease of understanding. The second 2026 update was 26.2, adding the sulfur cave biome and sulfur cube mob. The next update was 26.3, introducing the dappled forest biome and a range of new tools. Game drop 26.4, Deep Freeze, added ice caves and expanded variants of the existing snow and ice blocks, as well as the frozen zombie variant.

=== Legacy console edition ===
The console versions of Minecraft debuted with the Xbox 360 edition, developed by 4J Studios and released on 9 May 2012. Announced as part of the Xbox Live Arcade NEXT promotion, this version introduced a redesigned crafting system, a new control interface, in-game tutorials, split-screen multiplayer, and online play via Xbox Live. Unlike the PC version, its worlds were finite, bordered by invisible walls. The Xbox 360 version evolved from an outdated PC port to a Java-equivalent edition before it was discontinued. The Xbox One version launched on 5 September 2014, featuring larger worlds and support for more players. Minecraft expanded to PlayStation platforms with PlayStation 3 and PlayStation 4 editions released on 17 December 2013 and 4 September 2014, respectively. Originally planned as a PS4 launch title, it was delayed before its eventual release. A PlayStation Vita version followed in October 2014. Like the Xbox versions, the PlayStation editions were developed by 4J Studios. Nintendo platforms received Minecraft: Wii U Edition on 17 December 2015, with a physical release in North America on 17 June 2016 and in Europe on 30 June. The Nintendo Switch version launched via the eShop on 11 May 2017.

On 18 December 2018, the PlayStation 3, PlayStation Vita, Xbox 360, and Wii U versions of Minecraft received their final update, which disabled world transfers to newer versions. Following their discontinuation, the editions would later become known as legacy console editions. The legacy console editions' source code was leaked on 4chan in 2026, revealing unused structures and world types.

=== Pocket Edition and Bedrock Edition ===
In August 2011, Minecraft: Pocket Edition was released as an early alpha for the Xperia Play via the Android Market, later expanding to other Android devices on 8 October 2011. The iOS version followed on 17 November 2011. A port was made available for Windows Phones shortly after Microsoft acquired Mojang. Unlike Java Edition, Pocket Edition initially focused on Minecraft's creative building and basic survival elements but lacked many features of the PC version. Bergensten confirmed on Twitter that the Pocket Edition was written in C++ rather than Java, as iOS does not support Java.

A port of Pocket Edition was released for Windows Phone 8.1 on 10 December 2014. In July 2015, a port of the Pocket Edition to Windows 10 was released as the Windows 10 Edition, with full crossplay to other Pocket versions. In January 2017, Microsoft announced that it would no longer maintain the Windows Phone versions of Pocket Edition.

On 27 October 2016, Apple announced that Minecraft would be released for the fourth-generation Apple TV. The game, titled Minecraft: Apple TV Edition, was released on 19 December 2016. On 24 September 2018, Mojang announced that updates for the Apple TV version would end due to its small player base. On 19 December 2016, Minecraft: Fire TV Edition was released for Amazon Fire TV devices. Like the Apple TV version, it was designed for television play using a controller or remote. As of June 2021, Minecraft is no longer supported on Fire TV Gen 1 and Fire TV Gen 2.

During a Nintendo Direct presentation on 13 September 2017, Nintendo announced that Minecraft: New Nintendo 3DS Edition, based on the Pocket Edition, would be available for download immediately after the livestream, and a physical copy available on a later date. The game is compatible only with the New Nintendo 3DS or New Nintendo 2DS XL systems and does not work with the original 3DS or 2DS systems. This version received its final update on 15 January 2019 and was subsequently discontinued.

On 20 September 2017, the Better Together Update merged the Windows 10 Edition, Xbox One Edition, and Pocket Edition into the unified Bedrock Edition, enabling cross-play between different platforms. (Note: There was cross-play between Pocket Edition and Windows 10 Edition before it was merged.) Bedrock Edition was later released for Nintendo Switch and PlayStation 4, with the latter receiving the update in December 2019, allowing cross-platform play for users with a free Xbox Live account. The Bedrock Edition released a native version for PlayStation 5 on 22 October 2024, while the Xbox Series X/S version launched on 17 June 2025. A version of Bedrock Edition for the Nintendo Switch 2 was announced in a Nintendo Direct on 9 June 2026 and was released on 27 October.

=== Other versions ===
An educational version of Minecraft, designed for use in schools, launched on 1 November 2016. It is available on Android, ChromeOS, iPadOS, iOS, MacOS, and Windows. On 20 August 2018, Mojang announced that it would bring Education Edition to iPadOS in Autumn 2018. It was released to the App Store on 6 September 2018. On 27 March 2019, it was announced that it would be operated by JD.com in China. On 26 June 2020, a public beta for the Education Edition was made available to Google Play Store compatible Chromebooks. The full game was released to the Google Play Store for Chromebooks on 7 August 2020.

On 20 May 2016, China Edition (also known as My World) was announced as a localized edition for China, where it was released under a licensing agreement between NetEase and Mojang. The PC edition was released for public testing on 8 August 2017. The iOS version was released on 15 September 2017, and the Android version was released on 12 October 2017. The PC edition is based on the original Java Edition, while the iOS and Android mobile versions are based on the Bedrock Edition. The edition is free-to-play and had over 700 million registered accounts by September 2023.

On 7 June 2022, the Java and Bedrock Editions of Minecraft were merged into a single bundle for purchase on Windows; those who owned one version would automatically gain access to the other version. Both game versions would otherwise remain separate.

A version of Minecraft for the Raspberry Pi single board computer was released in alpha on 11 February 2013. It shares many similarities with Minecraft: Pocket Edition Alpha v0.6.1, upon which it is based. The only available game mode is Creative Mode; Survival Mode is disabled, and there is no crafting or smelting system. A distinguishing feature of Pi Edition compared to standard Pocket Edition is its built-in application programming interface (API). The API allows players and developers to interact with and control the in-game environment through externally written programs, supporting languages including Python. This feature made Pi Edition particularly attractive for educational use, enabling teachers and students to write code that directly manipulates the Minecraft world in real time. Pi Edition never received any subsequent updates after its initial release. Despite this, it was included by default in installations of Raspberry Pi OS for several years before eventually being dropped from the platform. Although it has been officially discontinued, it remains available as a free download from the official Minecraft website.

== Reception ==
=== Critical response ===
Reception

Aggregate score
Aggregator	Score
Metacritic	(PC) 93/100 (PS4) 89/100 (XONE) 88/100 (PS3) 86/100 (NS) 86/100 (VITA) 84/100 (X360) 82/100 (WIIU) 77/100 (3DS) 62/100 (iOS) 53/100

Review scores
Publication	Score
1Up.com	(PC) A+
Edge	(PC) 9/10
Eurogamer	(PC) 10/10 (X360) 9/10
Game Informer	(PC) 9.25/10 (X360) 8.75/10
GameSpot	(PC) 8.5/10 (X360) 7.0/10
GameSpy	(PC) 5/5
IGN	(PC) 9.0/10 (iOS) 7.5/10 (X360) 8.5/10 (PS3) 9.5/10 (PS4) 9.7/10 (XONE) 9.7/10 (VITA) 9.5/10 (NS) 9.5/10 (3DS) 6.5/10
Nintendo Life	(WII U) 7.5/10 (3DS) 6.6/10 (NS) 8.2/10
PC Gamer (US)	(PC) 96/100
TouchArcade	(iOS) 3.5/5 (Version 0.12) 5/5

Minecraft has received critical acclaim, receiving a weighted score of 93 out of 100 on the review aggregator website Metacritic for the PC version of the game. Alec Meer of Eurogamer rated it 10/10, calling it "unmissable" and the defining game of its decade, and Sean Bell of The Telegraph rated it 5/5, describing it as an "international phenomenon". Writing years later, Alex Avard of GamesRadar+ continued to treat it as a foundational and commercially significant title, crediting it with popularizing the survival-crafting genre. It has been regarded as having introduced millions of children to the digital world, insofar as its basic game mechanics are logically analogous to computer commands.

Critics singled out the game's procedurally generated worlds and open-ended building as its central strengths. Jaz McDougall of PC Gamer described the terrain as a patchwork of biomes, with forests giving way to plains, deserts, or icy islands, and Bell noted that a world would keep expanding as it was explored. McDougall also pointed to redstone circuitry and player-built computers as evidence of the game's depth, while Meer summarized the core loop simply as the ability to create and destroy, saying it could support anything from towers to functioning rail networks. Anthony Gallegos of IGN wrote that building his first wooden door gave him a sense of ownership that purchasing pre-built houses in other games could not replicate, and Avard described the game as a "big, beautiful 'Welcome' mat" to a player's imagination. The blocky visual style itself drew mixed reactions: Lukasz Znojek of GRY-Online.pl felt its "angular" look would not appeal to everyone, while Gallegos and GameTrailers both described the graphics as dated at first glance but ultimately charming and memorable once players adjusted to them.

The day-night cycle and its monsters drew widespread discussion. Bell recalled that new players vividly remember their "first night", fleeing zombies and skeletons or digging into the ground to wait for daylight, and Nathan Meunier of GameSpot said the cycle had a "cool natural flow" that made the player "shift gears between fiddling around on the surface and hunkering down or heading below ground". Nathan Grayson of GameSpy recounted a specific early encounter, describing being caught in an open field with only wood and a flower before a creeper's explosion killed the zombies pursuing him. Several reviewers also flagged the absence of any in-game tutorial as a shortcoming: Meunier said it forced players to learn crafting recipes from outside sources, and Gallegos said following an external wiki verbatim offered little sense of accomplishment.

Multiplayer and the surrounding community were credited with extending the game beyond its single-player offering. Bell described how players on servers instinctively built settlements together without explicit direction from the game, and McDougall said their most rewarding sessions came from teaming with a small group of builders who each gravitated toward a specialty. Adam Biessener of Game Informer credited the player base with producing new mechanics through modding, arguing this made Minecraft function as much like a platform as a game, and Avard praised the Better Together update for finally letting players join servers without first researching IP addresses.

Assessments of the game's more structured, RPG-inspired additions were more mixed. Meer wrote that the pursuit of rare materials and Ender Dragon fight felt "undercooked" next to the simpler pleasures of construction and survival, and Biessener called the achievement and enchanting systems "lame, unwelcome distractions", though he still viewed the game overall as a considerable achievement. GameTrailers found the boss encounter and experience system "half-implemented" and more of a sideshow than a core feature. Simone Tagliaferri of Multiplayer.it, reviewing the official 1.0 release, argued it amounted to a formality, since little about the core loop of digging, crafting, and combining materials had changed since the alpha version, and Znojek's retrospective coverage argued that the player base had grown more divided over time, pointing to unfinished systems like an alchemy mechanic that shipped with only a fraction of its announced potions.

The Xbox 360 version was generally received positively by critics, but did not receive as much praise as the PC version. Although reviewers were disappointed by the lack of features such as mod support and content from the PC version, they acclaimed the port's addition of a tutorial and in-game tips and crafting recipes, saying that they make the game more user-friendly. The Xbox One Edition was one of the best received ports, being praised for its relatively large worlds. The PlayStation 3 Edition received generally favorable reviews, being compared to the Xbox 360 Edition and praised for its well-adapted controls. The PlayStation 4 edition was the best received port to date, being praised for having 36 times larger worlds than the PlayStation 3 edition and described as nearly identical to the Xbox One edition. The PlayStation Vita Edition received generally positive reviews from critics but was noted for its technical limitations.

The Wii U Version received generally positive reviews from critics but was noted for a lack of GamePad integration. The 3DS version received mixed reviews, being criticized for its high price, technical issues, and lack of cross-platform play. The Nintendo Switch Edition received fairly positive reviews from critics, being praised, like other modern ports, for its relatively larger worlds. Minecraft: Pocket Edition initially received mixed reviews from critics. Although reviewers appreciated the game's intuitive controls, they were disappointed by the lack of content. The inability to collect resources and craft items, as well as the limited types of blocks and lack of hostile mobs, were especially criticized. After updates added more content, Pocket Edition started receiving more positive reviews. Reviewers complimented the controls and the graphics, but still noted a lack of content.

=== Awards ===
In July 2010, PC Gamer listed Minecraft as the fourth-best game to play at work. In December of that year, Good Game selected Minecraft as their choice for Best Downloadable Game of 2010, Gamasutra named it the eighth best game of the year as well as the eighth best indie game of the year, and Rock Paper Shotgun named it the "game of the year". Indie DB awarded the game the 2010 Indie of the Year award as chosen by voters, in addition to two out of five Editor's Choice awards for Most Innovative and Best Singleplayer Indie. It was also awarded Game of the Year by PC Gamer UK. The game was nominated for the Seumas McNally Grand Prize, Technical Excellence, and Excellence in Design awards at the March 2011 Independent Games Festival and won the Grand Prize and the community-voted Audience Award. At Game Developers Choice Awards 2011, Minecraft won awards in the categories for Best Debut Game, Best Downloadable Game and Innovation Award, winning every award for which it was nominated. It also won GameCity's video game arts award. On 5 May 2011, Minecraft was selected as one of the 80 games that would be displayed at the Smithsonian American Art Museum as part of The Art of Video Games exhibit that opened on 16 March 2012. At the 2011 Spike Video Game Awards, Minecraft won the award for Best Independent Game and was nominated in the Best PC Game category. In 2012, at the British Academy Video Games Awards, Minecraft was nominated in the GAME Award of 2011 category and Persson received The Special Award. In 2012, Minecraft XBLA was awarded a Golden Joystick Award in the Best Downloadable Game category, and a TIGA Games Industry Award in the Best Arcade Game category. In 2013, it was nominated as the family game of the year at the British Academy Video Games Awards. Also in 2013, Herobrine, a popular Minecraft creepypasta ranked 46th on a poll for the Top 50 Video Game Villains of All Time, which was organized by Guinness World Records. During the 16th Annual D.I.C.E. Awards, the Academy of Interactive Arts & Sciences nominated the Xbox 360 version of Minecraft for "Strategy/Simulation Game of the Year". Minecraft Console Edition won the award for TIGA Game of the Year in 2014. In 2015, the game placed sixth on USgamer's The 15 Best Games Since 2000 list. In 2016, Minecraft placed 6th on Time's The 50 Best Video Games of All Time list.

Minecraft was nominated for the 2013 Kids' Choice Awards for Favorite App, but lost to Temple Run. It was nominated for the 2014 Kids' Choice Awards for Favorite Video Game, but lost to Just Dance 2014. The game later won the award for the Most Addicting Game at the 2015 Kids' Choice Awards. In addition, the Java Edition was nominated for "Favorite Video Game" at the 2018 Kids' Choice Awards, while the game itself won the "Still Playing" award at the 2019 Golden Joystick Awards, as well as the "Favorite Video Game" award at the 2020 Kids' Choice Awards. Minecraft also won "Stream Game of the Year" at inaugural Streamer Awards in 2021. The game later garnered a Nickelodeon Kids' Choice Award nomination for Favorite Video Game in 2021, and won the same category in 2022 and 2023. At the Golden Joystick Awards 2025, it won the Still Playing Award – PC and Console; it won the same award again at the Golden Joystick Awards 2026. At the Swedish Game Awards in 2026, Minecraft won the Best Live Service Game Award. At the 2026 Streamer Awards, Minecraft was nominated for Stream Game of the Year.

=== Controversies ===
In June 2014, Mojang announced that it would begin enforcing the portion of Minecraft's end-user license agreement (EULA) which prohibits servers from giving in-game advantages to players in exchange for donations or payments. Spokesperson Owen Hill stated that servers could still require players to pay a fee to access the server and could sell in-game cosmetic items. The change was supported by Persson, citing emails he received from parents of children who had spent hundreds of dollars on servers. The Minecraft community and server owners protested, arguing that the EULA's terms were more broad than Mojang was claiming, that the crackdown would force smaller servers to shut down for financial reasons, and that Mojang was suppressing competition for its own Minecraft Realms subscription service. The controversy contributed to Notch's decision to sell Mojang.

In 2020, Mojang announced an eventual change to the Java Edition to require a login from a Microsoft account rather than a Mojang account, the latter of which would be sunsetted. This also required Java Edition players to create Xbox network Gamertags. Mojang defended the move to Microsoft accounts by saying that improved security could be offered, including two-factor authentication, blocking cyberbullies in chat, and improved parental controls. The community responded with intense backlash, citing various technical difficulties encountered in the process and how account migration would be mandatory, even for those who do not play on servers. As of 10 March 2022, Microsoft required that all players migrate to maintain access to the Java Edition of Minecraft. Mojang announced a deadline of 19 September 2023 for account migration, after which all legacy Mojang accounts became inaccessible and unable to be migrated.

In June 2022, Mojang added a player-reporting feature in Java Edition. Players could report other players on multiplayer servers for sending messages prohibited by the Xbox Live Code of Conduct; report categories included profane language, substance abuse, hate speech, threats of violence, and nudity. If a player was found to be in violation of Xbox Community Standards, they would be banned from all servers for a specific period of time or permanently. The update containing the report feature (1.19.1) was released on 27 July 2022. Mojang received substantial backlash and protest from community members, one of the most common complaints being that banned players would be forbidden from joining any server, even private ones. Others took issue to what they saw as Microsoft increasing control over its player base and exercising censorship, leading some to start a hashtag #saveminecraft and dub the version "1.19.84", a reference to the dystopian novel Nineteen Eighty-Four.

==== Mob Vote ====
The "Mob Vote" was an online event organized by Mojang in which the Minecraft community voted between three original mob concepts; initially, the winning mob was to be implemented in a future update, while the losing mobs were scrapped, though after the first mob vote this was changed, and losing mobs would now have a chance to come to the game in the future. The first Mob Vote was held during Minecon Earth 2017 and became an annual event starting with Minecraft Live 2020. The Mob Vote was often criticized for forcing players to choose one mob instead of implementing all three, causing divisions and flaming within the community, and potentially allowing internet bots and Minecraft content creators with large fanbases to conduct vote brigading. The Mob Vote was also blamed for a perceived lack of new content added to Minecraft since Microsoft's acquisition of Mojang in 2014.

The 2023 Mob Vote featured three passive mobs—the crab, the penguin, and the armadillo—with voting scheduled to start on 13 October. In response, a Change.org petition was created on 6 October, demanding that Mojang eliminate the Mob Vote and instead implement all three mobs going forward. The petition received approximately 445,000 signatures by 13 October and was joined by calls to boycott the Mob Vote, as well as a partially tongue-in-cheek "revolutionary" propaganda campaign in which sympathizers created anti-Mojang and pro-boycott posters in the vein of real 20th century propaganda posters. Mojang did not release an official response to the boycott, and the Mob Vote otherwise proceeded normally, with the armadillo winning the vote. In September 2024, as part of a blog post detailing their future plans for Minecraft's development, Mojang announced the Mob Vote would be retired.

=== Sales ===
Minecraft surpassed over a million purchases less than a month after entering its beta phase in December 2010, despite having no publisher backing or commercial advertisement except through word of mouth and unpaid references in popular media such as the Penny Arcade webcomic. By April 2011, Persson estimated that the alpha version had generated 800,000 sales and the beta version over one million, producing approximately €23 million (US$33 million) in revenue. Prior to the game's full release in November 2011, the beta had accumulated more than 16 million registered users and 4 million purchases. By March 2012, Minecraft had sold over five million copies on PC, making it the sixth best-selling PC game of all time. Eight months later, in November 2012, PC sales had risen to over eight million copies. PC sales reached 10 million in April 2013, and the following month, Pocket Edition sales independently reached 10 million. As of 26 February 2014, the PC version had sold 14.3 million copies. By October 2014, PC sales had surpassed 17 million, at which point Minecraft became the best-selling PC game of all time. In April 2019, PC sales reached 30 million copies.

The Xbox 360 version became profitable on its first day of release in 2012, breaking Xbox Live sales records with 400,000 players online simultaneously. Within one week of its appearance on the Xbox Live Marketplace, the Xbox 360 version had sold one million copies. In December 2012, GameSpot reported that the Xbox version had sold 4.48 million copies since its debut on Xbox Live Arcade in May 2012, bringing total cross-platform sales at that time to 17.5 million. For the full year 2012, Minecraft ranked as the most purchased title on Xbox Live Arcade and the fourth most played title on Xbox Live by average unique users per day. As of 4 April 2014, the Xbox 360 version had sold 12 million copies. Minecraft contributed $63 million to Microsoft's total first-party revenue in the second quarter of 2015. The PlayStation 3 Edition sold one million copies within five weeks of release. The PlayStation Vita version's launch produced a 79% increase in overall Minecraft sales, outselling both the PS3 and PS4 debut releases and becoming the largest Minecraft launch on a PlayStation platform. Within the first two months of its Japanese release, the PS Vita version sold 100,000 digital copies, as reported by SCE Japan Asia. By January 2015, 500,000 digital copies had been sold across all PlayStation platforms in Japan, with primary school children representing a notable portion of PS Vita purchasers. As of 2022, the PS Vita version had sold over 1.65 million physical copies in Japan, making it the best-selling Vita game in the country. Separately, Minecraft: Pocket Edition reached 21 million in total sales, and Minecraft: China Edition had accumulated over 700 million registered accounts by September 2023.

On 25 February 2014, the game reached 100 million registered users across all platforms. In June 2016, total cross-platform sales reached 100 million units, and by October 2018 that figure had grown to 154 million copies. In May 2019, on the tenth anniversary of the game's release, total sales surpassed 176 million copies, making Minecraft the best-selling video game of all time. By 2023, total sales had exceeded 300 million copies, and as of May 2026, the figure stood at over 400 million. In January 2020, Minecraft was reported to be the best-selling new intellectual property of the 2010s in the United Kingdom by units, though Destiny surpassed it in that market by revenue. By September 2019, all versions of the game combined had over 112 million monthly active players. In May 2020, on the game's eleventh anniversary, Mojang announced that Minecraft had surpassed 200 million copies sold across platforms, with over 126 million monthly active players. By April 2021, the monthly active user count had risen further to 140 million.

== Legacy ==
In September 2019, The Guardian classified Minecraft as the best video game of the 21st century to date, and in November 2019, Polygon called it the "most important game of the decade" in its 2010s "decade in review". In June 2020, Minecraft was inducted into the World Video Game Hall of Fame. Minecraft is recognized as one of the first successful games to use an early access model to draw in sales prior to its full release version to help fund development. As Minecraft helped to bolster indie game development in the early 2010s, it also helped to popularize the use of the early access model in indie game development.

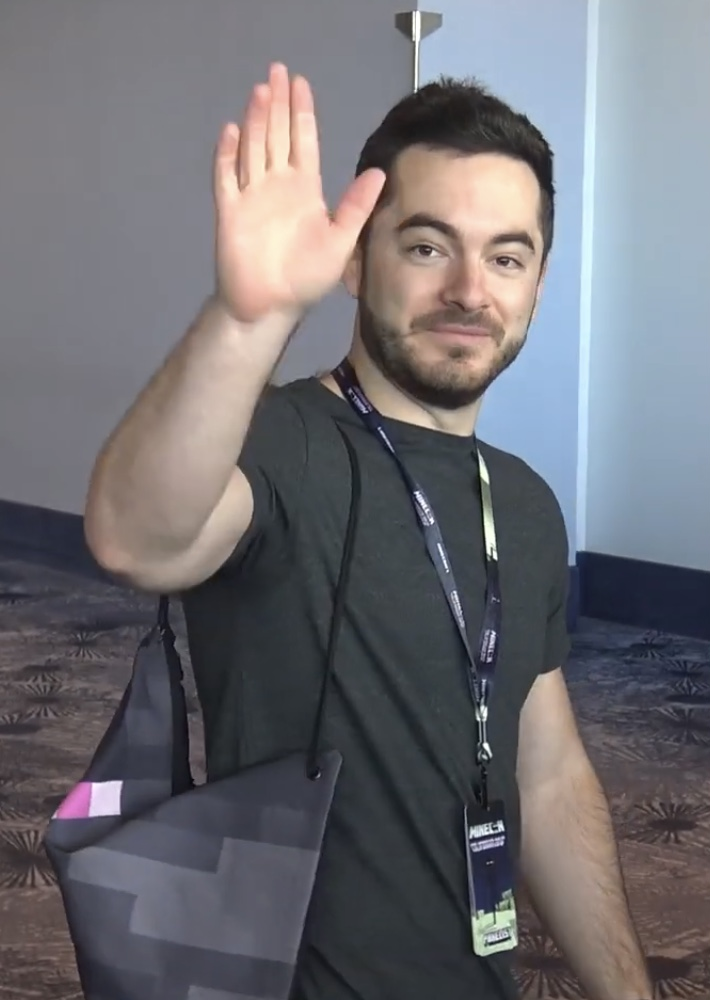
Jordan Maron (known professionally as "CaptainSparklez") is known for his musical Minecraft parodies of popular songs.

Social media sites such as YouTube, Facebook, and Reddit have played a significant role in popularizing Minecraft. Research conducted by the Annenberg School for Communication at the University of Pennsylvania showed that one-third of Minecraft players learned about the game via Internet videos. In 2010, Minecraft-related videos began to gain influence on YouTube, often made by commentators. The videos usually contain screen-capture footage of the game and voice-overs. Common coverage in the videos includes creations made by players, walkthroughs of various tasks, and parodies of works in popular culture. By May 2012, over four million Minecraft-related YouTube videos had been uploaded. The game would go on to be a prominent fixture within YouTube's gaming scene during the entire 2010s; in 2014, it was the second-most searched term on the entire platform. By 2018, it was still YouTube's biggest game globally. YouTube announced on 14 December 2021 that the total amount of Minecraft-related views on the website had exceeded one trillion.

Some popular commentators have received employment at Machinima, a now-defunct gaming video company that owned a highly watched entertainment channel on YouTube. The Yogscast is a British company that regularly produces Minecraft videos; their YouTube channel has attained billions of views, and their panel at Minecon 2011 had the highest attendance. Another well-known YouTube personality is Jordan Maron, known online as CaptainSparklez, who has also created many Minecraft music parodies, including "Revenge", a parody of Usher's "DJ Got Us Fallin' in Love". Minecraft's popularity on YouTube was described by Polygon as quietly dominant, although in 2019, thanks in part to PewDiePie's playthroughs of the game, Minecraft experienced a visible uptick in popularity on the platform. Longer-running series include Far Lands or Bust, dedicated to reaching the obsolete "Far Lands" glitch by foot on an older version of the game.

Minecraft has been referenced by other video games, such as Torchlight II, Team Fortress 2, Borderlands 2, Choplifter HD, Super Meat Boy, The Elder Scrolls V: Skyrim, The Binding of Isaac, The Stanley Parable, and FTL: Faster Than Light. Minecraft is officially represented in downloadable content for the crossover fighter Super Smash Bros. Ultimate, with Steve as a playable character with a moveset including references to building, crafting, and redstone, alongside an Overworld-themed stage. It was also referenced by electronic music artist Deadmau5 in his performances. The game is also referenced heavily in "Informative Murder Porn", the second episode of the seventeenth season of the animated television series South Park. In 2025, A Minecraft Movie was released. It generated $313 million in the box office in the first week, a record-breaking opening for a video game adaptation. Minecraft has been noted as a cultural touchstone for Generation Z, as many of the generation's members played the game at a young age. Minecraft speedrunning is widely practiced despite the game's unpredictable procedural generation. The most popular category, Random-Seed Glitchless, tasks players with defeating the Ender Dragon as quickly as possible starting from a new world spawn. Some speedrunners employ a combination of mods, external programs, and debug menus to optimize their runs, while others compete under conditions closer to the default game, prioritizing consistency over the use of such tools.

=== Real-world applications ===
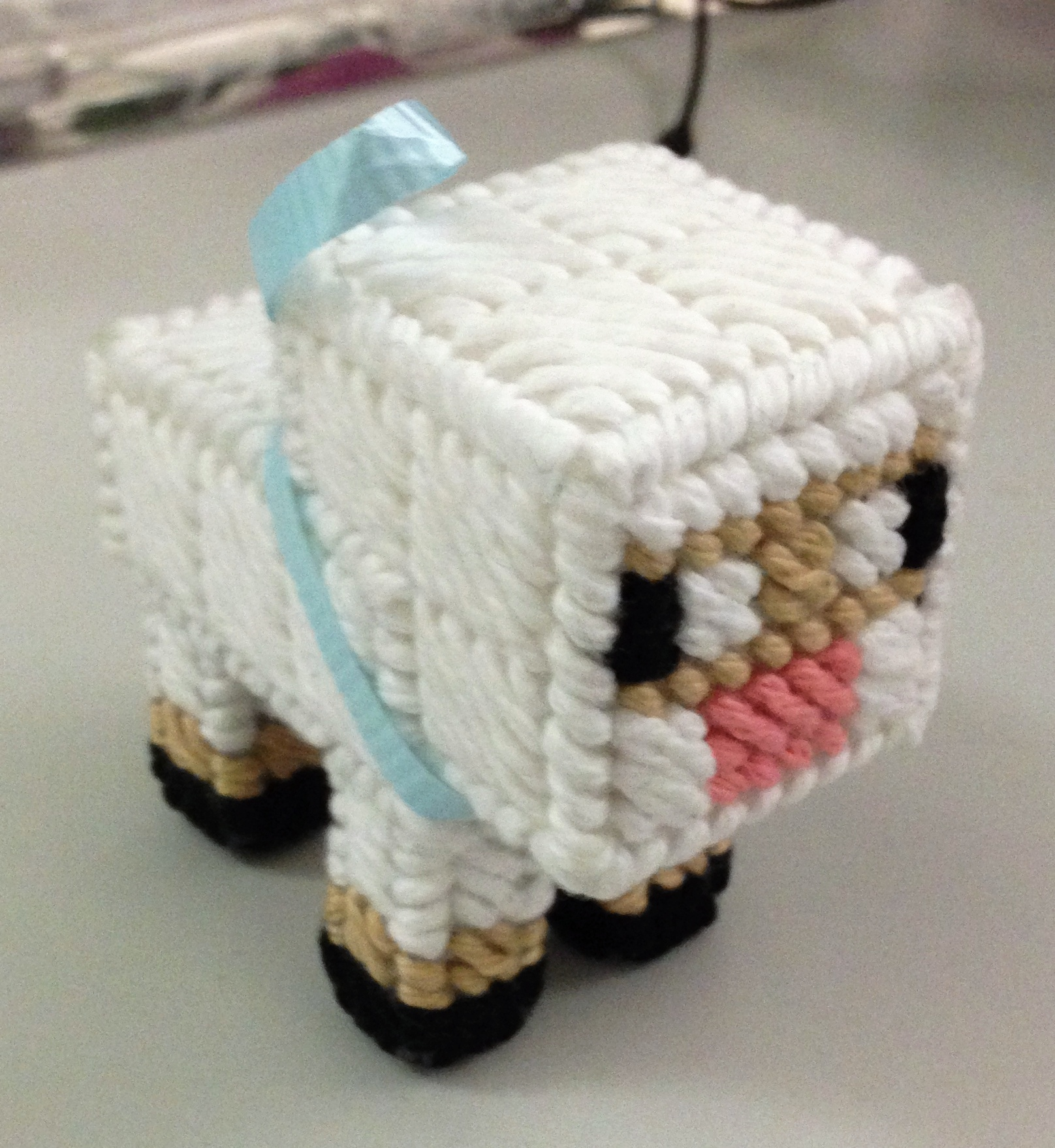
A yarn Minecraft sheep

In a 2011 Minecon panel, a Swedish developer raised the possibility of using Minecraft to redesign public buildings and parks, arguing that rendering within the game was more accessible to community members and made it easier to envision the functionality of proposed structures. The following year, Cody Sumter, a member of the Human Dynamics group at the MIT Media Lab, remarked that developer Notch had effectively introduced forty million people to the functional logic of a computer-aided design (CAD) program. Various software tools were developed to allow designs created within Minecraft to be output through professional 3D printers as well as personal devices such as MakerBot and RepRap.

Also in 2012, Mojang launched the Block by Block project in partnership with UN Habitat, with the aim of recreating real-world environments inside the game so that residents could participate in designing changes to their own neighborhoods by modifying representations of their communities directly. Mojang's managing director, Carl Manneh, described the game as the "perfect" tool for facilitating this process and said that the three-year partnership was intended to support UN Habitat's Sustainable Urban Development Network in upgrading 300 public spaces by 2016. Mojang engaged the Minecraft building community FyreUK to assist in rendering the relevant environments, and the first pilot project was launched in Kibera, one of Nairobi's informal settlements.

In April 2014, the Danish Geodata Agency used its own geodata to generate a full-scale representation of Denmark within Minecraft. The project was feasible in part because Denmark ranks among the flattest countries in the world, with its highest point standing at 171 meters and its elevation span placing it 30th smallest globally. At the time the project was completed, the default vertical limit in Minecraft was approximately 192 meters above in-game sea level, which was sufficient to accommodate Denmark's terrain.

The non-governmental organization Reporters Without Borders took advantage of Minecraft's accessibility in regions where other internet resources are censored, establishing an open server to host what it called the Uncensored Library. The library functions as an in-game repository of journalism produced by writers from countries including Egypt, Mexico, Russia, Saudi Arabia, and Vietnam, among them figures who have been censored or arrested, such as Jamal Khashoggi. The neoclassical virtual building housing the repository was constructed over approximately 250 hours by an international team of 24 people.

=== Use in education ===
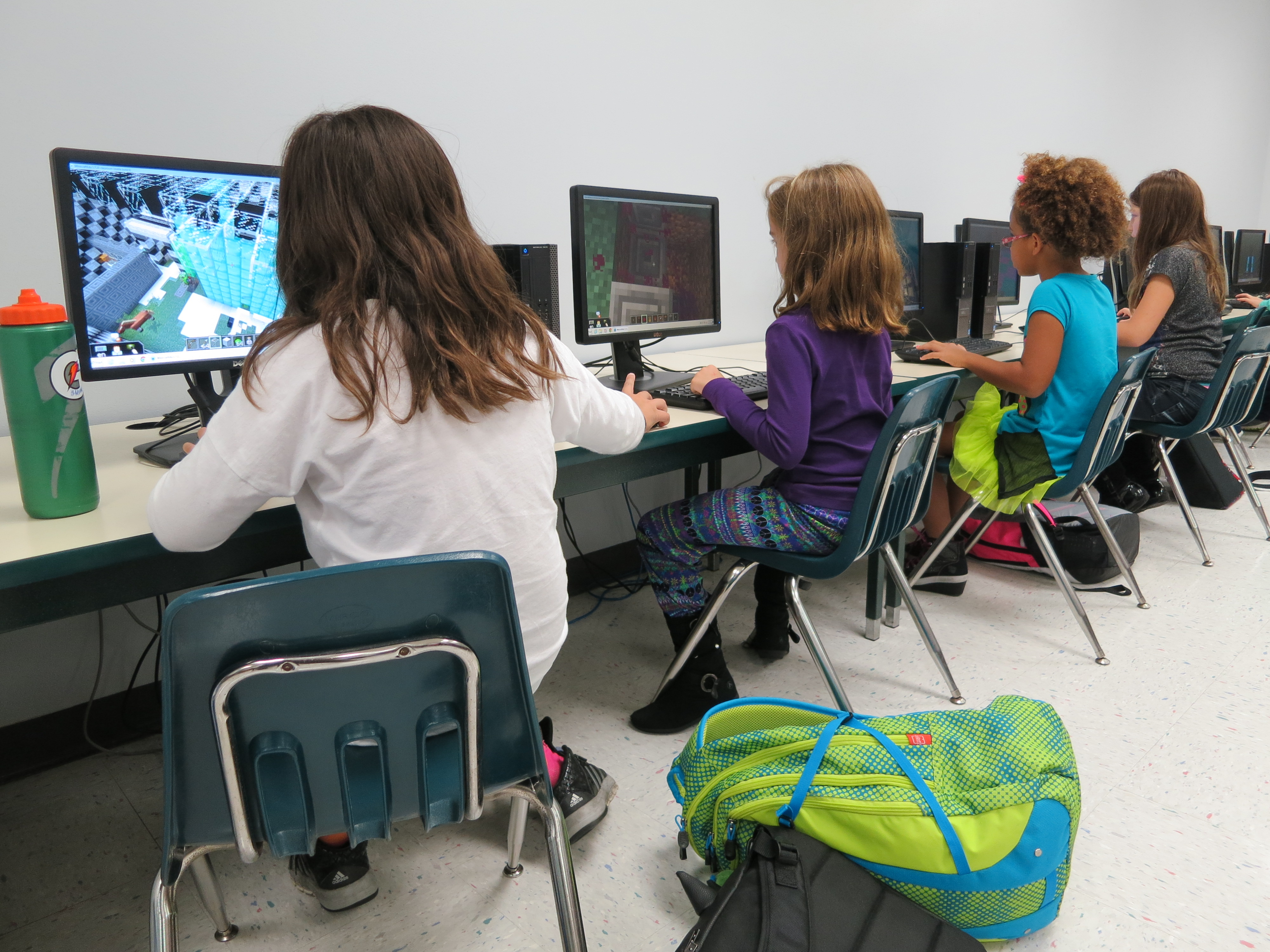
Minecraft being played in an educational setting

Minecraft has been used in educational settings through initiatives such as MinecraftEdu, founded in 2011 to make the game affordable and accessible for schools in collaboration with Mojang. MinecraftEdu provided features allowing teachers to monitor student progress, including screenshot submissions as evidence of lesson completion, and by 2012 reported that approximately 250,000 students worldwide had access to the platform. Mojang also developed Minecraft: Education Edition with pre-built lesson plans for up to 30 students in a closed environment.

Educators have used Minecraft to teach subjects such as history, language arts, and science through custom-built environments, including reconstructions of historical landmarks and large-scale models of biological structures such as animal cells. The introduction of redstone blocks enabled the construction of functional virtual machines such as a hard drive and an 8-bit computer. Mods have been created to use these mechanics for teaching programming. In 2014, the British Museum announced a project to reproduce its building and exhibits in Minecraft in collaboration with the public. Microsoft and Code.org have offered Minecraft-based tutorials and activities designed to teach programming, reporting by 2018 that more than 85 million children had used their resources.

In 2025, the Musée de Minéralogie in Paris held a temporary exhibition titled "Minerals in Minecraft". In April 2026, Russian technology company Yandex launched a Minecraft server called "The Last Block" (Russian: Последний блок) designed to train middle school students for the Basic State Exam and high school students for the Unified State Exam. The server incorporates Alice AI as an assistant to help students prepare. Due to Mojang Studios discontinuing the sale of Minecraft in Russia since 2022, the website provides a pirated launcher.

=== Clones ===
Following the surge in Minecraft's popularity from 2010 onward, numerous other games were characterized as "clones" of it, whether due to direct inspiration or superficial visual similarity. Named examples include Ace of Spades, CastleMiner, FortressCraft, Terraria, and Luanti, formerly known as Minetest. David Frampton, designer of The Blockheads, acknowledged that his 2D game's low-resolution pixel art too closely resembled Minecraft's aesthetic, resulting in what he described as "some resistance" from fans. A homebrew adaptation of Minecraft's alpha version for the Nintendo DS, titled DScraft, was also released and noted for its fidelity to the original given the console's technical constraints. Following Microsoft's acquisition of Mojang, several developers announced clone titles specifically targeting Nintendo's consoles, which were at the time the only major platforms not to have received an official Minecraft release; these titles included UCraft by Nexis Games, Cube Life: Island Survival by Cypronia, Discovery by Noowanda, Cube Creator 3D by Big John Games, and Stone Shire by Finger Gun Games. Those concerns ultimately proved unfounded, as official Minecraft releases on Nintendo platforms eventually resumed.

Markus Persson developed a separate game, Minicraft, for a Ludum Dare competition in 2011. In 2025, Persson used a poll on his X account to signal he was considering a spiritual successor to Minecraft, subsequently clarifying he was "100% serious" and had effectively announced Minecraft 2, though he cancelled the plans within days after consulting his team. In November 2024, artificial intelligence companies Decart and Etched released Oasis, an AI-generated recreation of Minecraft presented as a proof of concept, in which every element is generated in real time without stored world data, producing hallucinations such as items and blocks appearing that had not previously been present. In January 2026, indie developer Unomelon announced that its voxel sandbox game Allumeria would be playable during that year's Steam Next Fest; on 10 February, Mojang issued a DMCA takedown of the game through Valve, alleging copyright infringement, though the takedown was later withdrawn.

=== Minecon and related events ===
Minecon was an annual official fan convention dedicated to Minecraft. The first full Minecon was held in November 2011 at the Mandalay Bay Hotel and Casino in Las Vegas. The event coincided with the official launch of Minecraft and included keynote speeches, including one by Persson, building and costume contests, Minecraft-themed breakout classes, exhibits by leading gaming and Minecraft-related companies, commemorative merchandise, and autograph and picture times with Mojang employees and well-known contributors from the Minecraft community. In 2016, Minecon was held in-person for the last time, with the following years featuring annual "Minecon Earth" livestreams on minecraft.net and YouTube instead. These livestreams, later rebranded to "Minecraft Live", included the mob/biome votes, and announcements of new game updates. In 2025, "Minecraft Live" became a biannual event as part of Minecraft's changing update schedule.

=== LGBTQ+ community ===
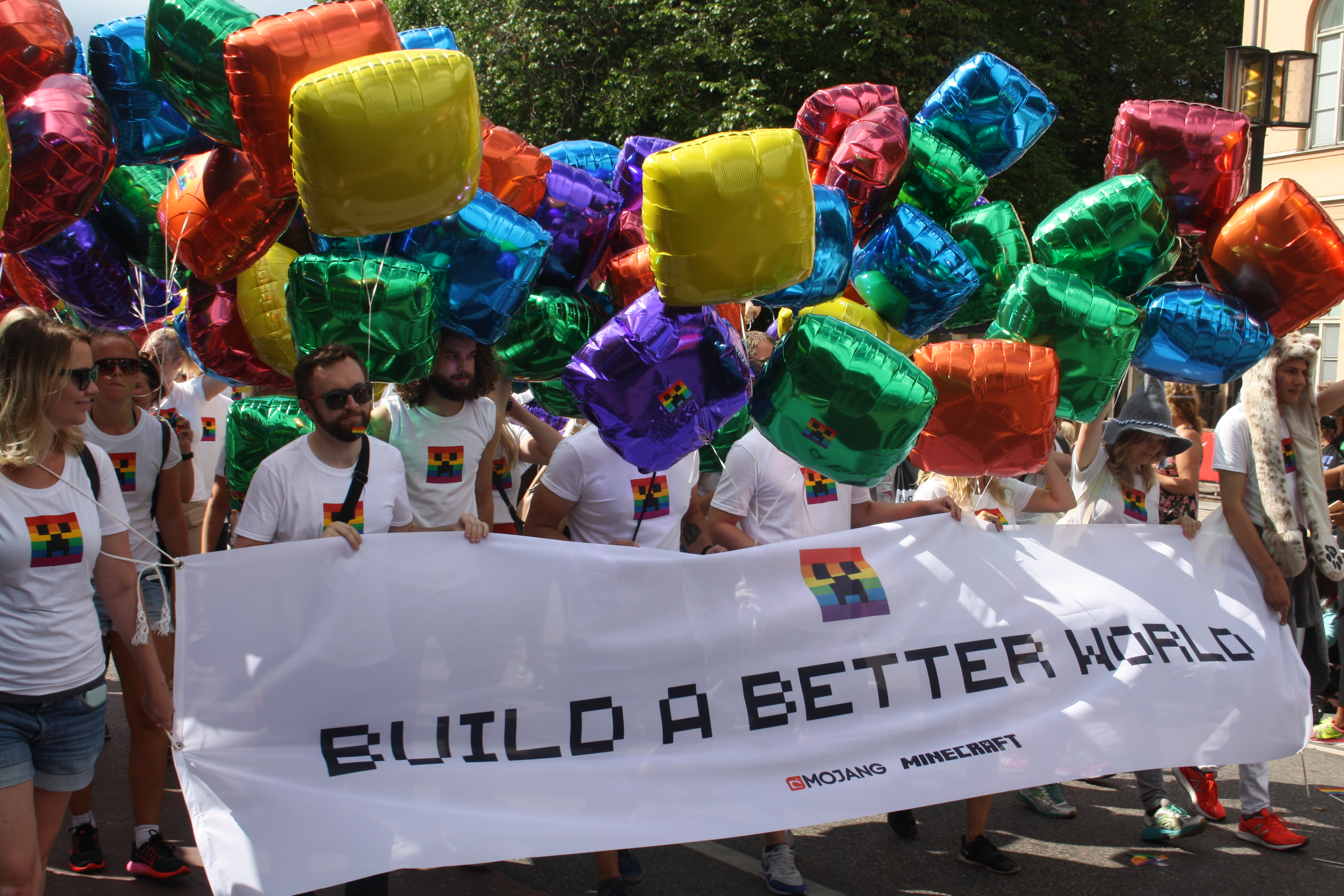
Mojang at Stockholm Pride 2016

In 2012, Business Insider pointed to a blog post by Persson, in which he stated that "All the other mobs in the game are genderless and usually exhibit the most prominent traits of both genders". He also said, "Also, as a fun side fact, it means every character and animal in Minecraft is homosexual because there's only one gender to choose from".

Minecraft has had an impact on queer communities, and over time has attracted many queer content creators and fandoms. Minecraft Education promotes gender equality, while Rosenfield has publicly expressed support for the LGBTQ+ community.

In August 2025, The Guardian published an article discussing Minecraft's impact on queerness and identity. The game is also associated with a significant shipping culture, particularly involving queer relationships and fan-created stories. One of the most prominent examples emerged from the Dream SMP fandom and its associated fan art and creative works.
