= Block by Block (program) =

Urban regeneration initiative

Block by Block is a charitable initiative founded as a partnership between Minecraft developer Mojang and the United Nations which aims to encourage young people to get involved in urban regeneration. The scheme uses Minecraft to allow children to rebuild and reimagine their hometowns.

The program began in Sweden, where Minecraft was first created, but has since expanded to many other countries. Mojang acts as the primary financial sponsor for the program. The project is part of the UN Habitat's Sustainable Urban Development Network.

The program follows in the footsteps of Mina Kvarter, a similar Swedish initiative that used Minecraft to modernise apartment complexes.

== History ==
UN Habitat logo, the partner for Block By Block

In September 2012, Mojang began the Block by Block project in cooperation with UN Habitat to create real-world environments in Minecraft. The project allows young people who live in those environments to participate in designing the changes they would like to see. Using Minecraft, the community has helped reconstruct the areas of concern, and citizens are invited to enter the Minecraft servers and modify their own neighborhood. Carl Manneh, Mojang's managing director, called the game "the perfect tool to facilitate this process", adding "The three-year partnership will support UN-Habitat's Sustainable Urban Development Network to upgrade 300 public spaces by 2016." Mojang signed Minecraft building community, FyreUK, to help render the environments into Minecraft. The first pilot project began in Kibera, one of Nairobi's informal settlements, and is in the planning phase. Block by Block is based on an earlier initiative started in October 2011, Mina Kvarter (My Block), which gave young people in Swedish communities a tool to visualize how they wanted to change their part of town. According to Manneh, the project was a helpful way to visualize urban planning ideas without necessarily having a training in architecture. The ideas presented by the citizens were a template for political decisions.
