= FortressCraft =

2011 video game

- Developer: ProjectorGames
- Publisher: ProjectorGames
- Designer: Adam Sawkins
- Artists: Andy Roo (3d modelling), Todd DuFore (DMPDesign), Craig Peterson aka Mayoradeath
- Composers: Arjan Kroes; Mark Knight
- Engine: XNA Framework
- Platforms: Xbox 360, Microsoft Windows
- Release: Xbox 360: WW: April 8, 2011; Microsoft Windows: WW: April 17, 2021
- Genre: Sandbox
- Modes: Single-player, multiplayer

FortressCraft is a video game by British indie developer Projector Games, released on Xbox Live Indie Games on April 8, 2011. FortressCraft cites Minecraft, Infiniminer and Dwarf Fortress as direct inspirations for the design aspect of the game. The game utilizes textured voxels to simulate landscapes, traditionally reminiscent of other titles in the genre.

FortressCraft makes use of Xbox Live Avatars that are associated with each player's Gamertag. The first and only chapter of FortressCraft has no set parameters, quests, or objectives—players are to forge their own personal worlds block-by-block alone or with friends on Xbox Live.

== Gameplay ==
Upon starting a new game, players spawn on a water-filled tower in a randomly generated world. From this point they may start exploring their world or assembling structures with the various block sets given to them. Conversely they may also choose to dig through the ground, hunting for Relics that give bonuses such as the ability to fly, to jump higher, to place TNT charges and blow up blocks, and more.

There are currently a total of 615 different cubic blocks in the game, each with their own pattern and design, along with 64 custom user-defined blocks. These cubic blocks in conjunction with the custom user-defined blocks can be used to build anything the player wants. The blocks vary from simple color and texture variants to being quite unique—the trampoline block, for example, is a unique block that propels players up in the air higher and higher with each jump.

There are four game modes playable in the latest version of FortressCraft:

- Freezetag – a variation of "tag", one player holds a freeze-ray and has to shoot another player to pass it on.
- Spleef – all players start on a canvas block arena, they have to shoot out the canvas from underneath the other players. Once a player touches a block that isn't a canvas, they are "spleefed" and out of the game, and the last man standing wins.
- Hunt – one player is "the hunter", a character that has partial invisibility and sees with vision similar to thermal imaging. This player has to find and attack the other players who have none of the perks listed above, the last player who hasn't been 'hunted' is the round winner. A new hunter is chosen for the next round.
- FPS mode (Fight, Protect, Survive) – this game mode was introduced in the 1.1 alpha patch. Two types of mob are spawned in the map: "harvesters" and "wasps". The player is required to kill the mobs to collect gears which are used to buy various items used in the game mode. This game mode is in very early stages of development and is likely to change in future patches.

The game also features a "Workshop", where the player can place down blocks to make an 8 x 8 x 8 block scale model which is then transformed into a single custom block allowing players to make unique blocks. These blocks can have effects added to them to allow them to rotate, wiggle, emit smoke, and many other actions when placed.

In a recent update new custom block effects were added, one such instance makes custom blocks emit lasers. When these lasers hit a "factory" custom type, the factory emits a "doodad". In its default state the doodad appears as a crate with the ProjectorGames logo, but the appearance can be changed upon placing a custom block on top of the factory. The doodads are affected by gravity and can be moved about on "conveyor" custom blocks or launched from "jumppad" customs.

== Ports ==
In 2012 it was announced that FortressCraft was to be released on the OnLive marketplace. Adam Sawkins stated that he was looking forward to having FortressCraft playable on the multiple platforms that OnLive provides, specifically the mobile versions. It was also announced that FortressCraft would be a part of the OnLive PlayPack subscription service. After Onlive was bought out, communications stopped between Sawkins and Onlive.

FortressCraft was then ported to the Unity game engine as "FortressCraft Evolved", allowing multiple platform support.

The original Xbox 360 version of FortressCraft was ported to PC with development beginning February 2021, and re-released on the Steam platform. The PC version contains unreleased features that were developed for OnLive like the universal avatars, and new features such as multiple world support, and higher limits such as increased view distance. The original release date was aimed towards the 10th anniversary of the game's original release (April 8, 2011), with this version being the anniversary edition.

== Reception ==
FortressCraft was met with favorable sales. Within the first two days of the game's release it was downloaded 40,000 times and purchased around 35,000 times. In August 2011, FortressCraft became the highest-grossing Xbox Live Indie Game title, with over one million dollars in sales. FortressCraft retained this record until May 2012, when Total Miner was announced to have sold 800,000 copies. As of May 1, 2012, the game has sold 750,000 units.

Internet Personality Daniel Keem better known as Keemstar was heavily involved in promoting the game and even made a deal with the developers where he made millions from the game.

Markus Persson, the creator of Minecraft, commented on the game, saying "FortressCraft is an obvious attempt to just take something popular and clone it as closely as possible. I still think it's important that people are allowed and able to do things like that, but it's hardly graceful." Adam Sawkins first responded to the criticism with an open letter to Persson, citing Minecraft as an inspiration, but crediting the differences present in FortressCraft. Sawkins later defended the credibility of FortressCraft in a feature run by IGN, stating, "It might do well on the name alone, but if you want sexy graphics and shaders and the creative aspect, you have FortressCraft. If you want to fight monsters and share stuff with your friends, you have Total Miner. Nobody will pay for Minecraft when they can pay $3.00 for Total Miner or FortressCraft". When asked about Mojang's perception of FortressCraft, the company's business chief Daniel Kaplan stated that they were bored with the video game clones, but that no legal action would be taken against ProjectorGames. Adam Sawkins responded to Kaplan's comments in an interview with Eurogamer, pointing out key differences between the vox games on the Xbox Live Marketplace and Minecraft. He also addressed how he believed the word "clone" was being unfairly used against recent vox games, whereas Minecraft, originally a clone of Infiniminer, did not receive the same treatment.

== See also ==
- Total Miner — The second Minecraft-inspired video game on XBLIG
- CastleMiner — The third such game on XBLIG
  - CastleMiner Z — The fourth such game on XBLIG, and the sequel to CastleMiner
