= CastleMiner =

2011 video game

- Developer: DigitalDNA Games
- Publisher: DigitalDNA Games
- Designer: Thomas Steinke
- Platform: Xbox 360 (XBLA)
- Release: July 27, 2011
- Genre: Sandbox
- Modes: Single-player, multiplayer

CastleMiner is a 2011 video game developed by American indie studio DigitalDNA Games and released on Xbox Live Indie Games on July 27, 2011. It is a block-building sandbox game that uses Xbox Live Avatars as the player characters.

Less than four months after its initial release, a sequel to the game called CastleMiner Z was released on November 9, 2011, CastleMiner Z was the most successful game on XBLIG and was the first title on the service to reach one million paid downloads. A third game, CastleMiner Warfare, was released for Windows PCs in 2013.

== Gameplay ==
When a new game is started, players can choose one of six different world types: lagoon, coastal, classic, flatland, desert, and arctic. Once the game loads, they spawn in the middle of the map. From here, they can start exploring the world or build different structures with a variety of blocks already given to them. Players also have the chance to earn special blocks such as freak-a-leak out, and to earn this block, you would have to do a groovy dance move in an online world (aka the matrix). They can also dig into the ground and build in the game world.

The game has over two hundred blocks available to use in the game, which are selected using a categorized user interface. Players have the ability to teleport to the surface, starting point or another player's location. Players can choose whether to make their online worlds privately or publicly accessible. During online play, players can decide who can build in their worlds, and have the option to kick or ban people from their server.

== Reception ==
In a September 2011 comparison video of the first three Minecraft-inspired titles released on Xbox Live Indie Games (which include CastleMiner, FortressCraft and Total Miner), Mike B. of video gaming-focused vlog Big Fat Fony Report said that CastleMiner was his least-favorite of the three titles, saying that the game lacked polish and didn't seem complete enough to be released. However, he did like that the game had a multiplayer client browser to visit other players' worlds.

Bill of video gaming-centered blog ExtraGuy reviewed both CastleMiner games; in his September 2011 review of the original CastleMiner, he gave the game a below-average grade of "D". He criticized CastleMiner for having choppy graphics at long distances, no water besides a "murky water" block that does not behave like actual water (i.e. not being able to sink and swim through it), (Note: CastleMiner was eventually updated to add water to the game, complete with proper physics.) and for having no blocks with unique geometry, mentioning that a fence block in the game was merely a fence texture applied on all faces of a regular block including the top, making fences in the game look awful. He states near the end of his review, "In [his] experience, every Minecraft clone on the Xbox 360 is a deliberate cash-in, but at least the lot of them know that entertainment equals cash. CastleMiner skips this assumption and goes to 'Minecraft clone equals cash'." Bill was more positive towards CastleMiner Z in his November 2011 review of the game. He praised the game for its addition of zombie survival to Minecraft-like games, although he wrote that "[t]he game is not a paragon of excellent performance or aesthetic" and mentioned that Z's game modes could have been added to the original CastleMiner easily as downloadable content. He gave the game an above-average "C+".

Despite these criticisms, as well as the eventual release of Minecraft: Xbox 360 Edition, the CastleMiner series have been commercially successful on Xbox Live Indie Games. On August 15, 2012, developer DigitalDNA Games announced that CastleMiner Z held the record as the all-time, best-selling Xbox Live Indie Game at over 900,000 units. It achieved this goal in only nine months, making it also the fastest-selling Xbox Live Indie Game, surpassing sales of similar Minecraft-inspired XBLIG games Total Miner and FortressCraft. Just over a month later on September 17, 2012, DigitalDNA Games announced that CastleMiner Z became the first-ever Xbox Live Indie Game to surpass one million sales on the platform, achieving the record in ten months. Later on April 4, 2013, the developer announced that CastleMiner Z has reached 1.5 million games sold on XBLIG, while later that month they announced that the original CastleMiner has also sold one million games.

== Other games ==
=== CastleMiner Z ===
CastleMiner Z
- Developer: DigitalDNA Games
- Publisher: DigitalDNA Games
- Designer: Thomas Steinke
- Platforms: Xbox 360 (XBLA), Steam (service)
- Release: November 9, 2011
- Genre: Sandbox
- Modes: Single-player, multiplayer

CastleMiner Z is a 2011 video game that was released on Xbox Live Indie Games on November 9, 2011, and is the sequel to CastleMiner.

In CastleMiner Z, players have to mine for their own resources instead of starting with them. Players can also craft weapons such as a shotgun or assault rifle. Another change from the original game is the addition of enemies including zombies, dragons, and demons. Online modes accommodate 2- to 8-player co-operative gameplay.

CastleMiner Z introduces "Awards", which are awarded for doing different things such as playing online for a certain number of hours, traveling a certain distance, crafting various items, and killing several zombies. The game was the most successful game on XBLIG and was the first title on the service to reach one million paid downloads. A remake of CastleMiner Z was announced to be in progress on Steam by DigitalDNA in December 2024.

=== CastleMiner Warfare ===
CastleMiner Warfare is a 2013 video game that was released for digital download on Windows PCs. It is the second sequel to CastleMiner, with gameplay that is inspired by the Call of Duty franchise.

== See also ==
- Infiniminer
- FortressCraft
- Minecraft
- Total Miner — the second such game on XBLIG
- Sandbox game
