= Upgrade (disambiguation) =

Upgrade which, in general, is both the process of replacing something with an improved version and the result of the process, may also refer to:

- Upgrade (film), a 2018 cyberpunk action film
- Upgraded (film), a 2024 romantic comedy
- Upgrade (novel), a 2022 science fiction novel by Blake Crouch
- "Upgrade U", a 2006 song by Beyoncé
- "Upgrade", a song from the 2015 musical Be More Chill
- Upgrader, a facility that upgrades bitumen into synthetic crude oil
- Academic upgrading, also known as remedial education
- Upgrade, Inc., American financial services company

== See also ==
- Update (disambiguation), an update is often an upgrade
