= The Copper Age =

The Copper Age may refer to:

- Chalcolithic, also known as the Copper Age
- The Copper Age, an update in the video game Minecraft
