= Grace period =

Period immediately after the deadline for an obligation during which a late fee is waived

A grace period is a period immediately after the deadline for an obligation during which a late fee, or other action that would have been taken as a result of failing to meet the deadline, is waived provided that the obligation is satisfied during the grace period. In other words, it is a length of time during which rules or penalties are waived or deferred. Grace periods can range from a number of minutes to a number of days or longer, and can apply in situations including arrival at a job, paying a bill, or meeting a government or legal requirement.

In law, a grace period is a time period during which a particular rule exceptionally does not apply, or only partially applies. For the grace period in patent law, see novelty (patent).

In games (video and real life), a grace period is the time after a respawn in which a player cannot be hit or killed – they are "safe" for a short time so that they will not die repeatedly, which would lead to loss of enjoyment and excessive lag.

== Types ==
=== Business ===
Some companies and organizations do not view someone who fulfills an obligation within a grace period any differently from someone who does so before the original deadline. Thus a subject who is past due, but who meets the obligation within the grace period, receives equal treatment and no penalty or negative reputation.

In other cases, clients may receive a partial, less severe penalty. For example, many utility companies will charge a small late fee for those who do not pay their bill by the stated due date. However, the utility service provider will wait a longer time before cutting off service.

Some companies may suspend certain privileges during a grace period. For example, self storage services will often waive a late fee if the rent is not paid for up to several days past the due date, but will deny the tenant access to his or her unit until the bill is paid.

=== Politics ===
In politics, a grace period or honeymoon period may be observed during the transition to a new administration as "an initial period of harmony and goodwill".

== Advantages and disadvantages ==
Grace periods can provide some advantages. For example, people who habitually fulfill their obligations on time, but are late on a rare occasion due to special circumstances, can avoid a penalty and maintain their reputation for timeliness provided they fulfill the obligation within the grace period.

However, habitual procrastinators may come to view the grace period as the actual deadline, and if, due to unforeseen circumstances, they are occasionally late beyond that, they might complain about the applied penalty.

== Credit cards ==
In personal finance, a grace period is the period during which no interest is charged on a credit card. See credit card interest for further information.

It can also be a time period after a payment due date within which the fee can be paid without penalty. For example, late charges may not be incurred for payments due on the first of the month if they are paid on or before the tenth of the month. In the United States, almost all credit cards offer a grace period on purchase transactions. An exception, for example, are the Upgrade credit cards.

== See also ==
- Grandfather clause
- Sunset clause
- Turn-off notice
