= Late fee =

Charge for late payments or returns

A late fee, also known as an overdue fine, late fine, or past due fee, is a charge fined against a client by a company or organization for not paying a bill or returning a rented or borrowed item by its due date. Its use is most commonly associated with businesses like creditors, video rental outlets and libraries. Late fees are generally calculated on a per day, per item basis.

Organizations encourage the payment of late fees by suspending a client's borrowing or rental privileges until accumulated fees are paid, sometimes after these fees have exceeded a certain level. Late fees are issued to people who do not pay on time and don't honor a lease or obligation for which they are responsible.

== Library fine ==
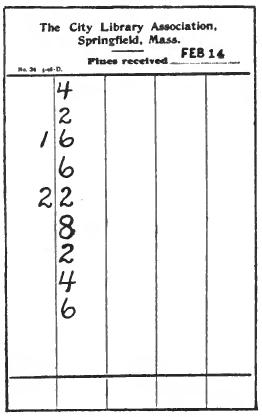
An illustration fine slip from A Library Primer (1899)

Library fines are small daily or weekly fees that libraries in many countries charge borrowers after a book or other borrowed item is kept past its due date. Library fines are an enforcement mechanism designed to ensure that library books are returned within a certain period of time and to provide increasing penalties for late items. Library fines do not typically accumulate over years or decades. Fines are usually assessed for only a few days or months, until a pre-set limit is reached.

Library fines are a small percentage of overall library budgets, but lost, stolen or un-returned library books can be costly for various levels of government that fund.

=== History ===
In the late 1800s, as modern circulating libraries began making checking out books possible for the general public, concerns rose about books being taken out and never returned. To encourage the return of books and to help fund the replacement acquisition of new books, libraries began assessing a fee on late books. For example, when the Aberdeen Free Library in Scotland opened in 1886, borrowers were fined a penny a week for every week a book was held longer than a fortnight.

Public libraries in New York began charging overdue fees in the late 1800s at a rate of 1 cent/day. That increased to 2 cents/day in 1954 and 5 cents/day in 1959. Before removing late fees in October 2021, the most common fee among New York City public libraries was 25 cents/day.

=== Elimination of fines ===
In recent years, many libraries have stopped charging fines. The Public Library Association and the Association of Library Services to Children have asked libraries to reconsider policies that may keep poor teens away for fear of fines. Many libraries also offer alternatives and amnesties in order to encourage patrons to return overdue books. "Food for Fines" programs, in which borrowers donate canned food in exchange for fine forgiveness, are common in libraries all over the world. Some libraries offer children and teens the option to "read down" their fines by reducing fines based on the amount of time spent reading or the number of books read. Other libraries may block access to library privileges until materials are returned. Librarians have had a longstanding debate over whether or not to charge late fines.

The American Library Association's (ALA) Policy 61 entitled, "Library Services to the Poor", promotes the removal of all barriers to library and information services, particularly fees and overdue charges. Proponents for the elimination of fines argue for waiving fees if they are a barrier for continued use of the library. They argue that it is imperative that the library staff understand its patrons' financial situations, and that the barrier-to-use posed by fines is an underlying problem that needs to be addressed. Gehner (2010) proposed that libraries work with the community to determine the community's need and to build relationships. He also posited that overdue fines could be a limiting factor: since libraries face limited funding, fees and fines represent both a source of revenue and a barrier to use.

In 2019, the ALA published its "Resolution on Monetary Library Fines as a Form of Social Inequity", which described monetary fines as an economic barrier to access to library materials and services, as well as a barrier to public relations and more valuable use of library staff time. Considered contrary to the mission of the modern public library, the ALA called for libraries to eliminate such barriers. Later that year, due to the economic hardship of the COVID-19 pandemic, many libraries suspended fines for late materials. Realizing the ability of their systems to absorb the economic costs of eliminating fines, many library systems eventually made the decision to go completely fine-free, long after the pandemic restrictions were lifted.

=== Enforcement ===
Some libraries have stepped up enforcement and collection of late fees. People who do not return library property after an extended period of time may face arrest or a negative action on their credit reports in some jurisdictions. Punitive measures such as these are typically used to recover stolen library property, not to enforce late fees. In some institutions, patrons are responsible for paying the cost of replacing lost items.

== Postage ==
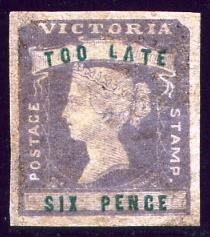
An 1855 Australian late fee stamp

A special use of the term "late fee" is postal surcharge once required by post offices to expedite delivery of a letter posted later than the normal pick-up time. For example, in Britain in 1856, a letter could be included in the night's mail for an extra penny if by 6:45 p.m. at the local office, for a tuppence by 7:15 p.m. at the Chief or District office, or for four pence by 7:30 p.m. at the Chief office. Such mail typically received a special postmark to note the late fee paid. Often a special Late Fee Box was provided.

== Poverty ==
Late fees charged by banks, landlords, and utilities have been heavily criticized as a penalty against the poor, and attempts have been made in some places to outlaw them completely or place caps on them. The argument against them is that the poor will inevitably be forced to pay them as they cannot earn the money to pay their bills by the due date. These people will be forced to pay even higher fees for the same services, and will find making future timely payments to their creditors even more difficult.

On the other hand, late fees are sometimes levied by freelancers when payments to them are delayed. In this case, late payments can help protect non-staffers against income instability.

== See also ==
- Grace period
- Turn-off notice
- Regarding libraries:
  - Library card
  - Public library
  - List of returned long-overdue library books
