= Development of Minecraft: Java Edition =

Development of 2011 video game

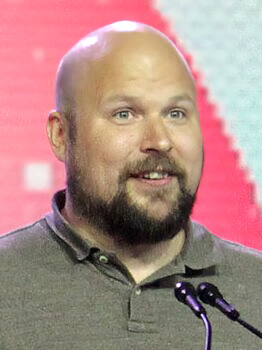
Markus "Notch" Persson, the creator of Minecraft

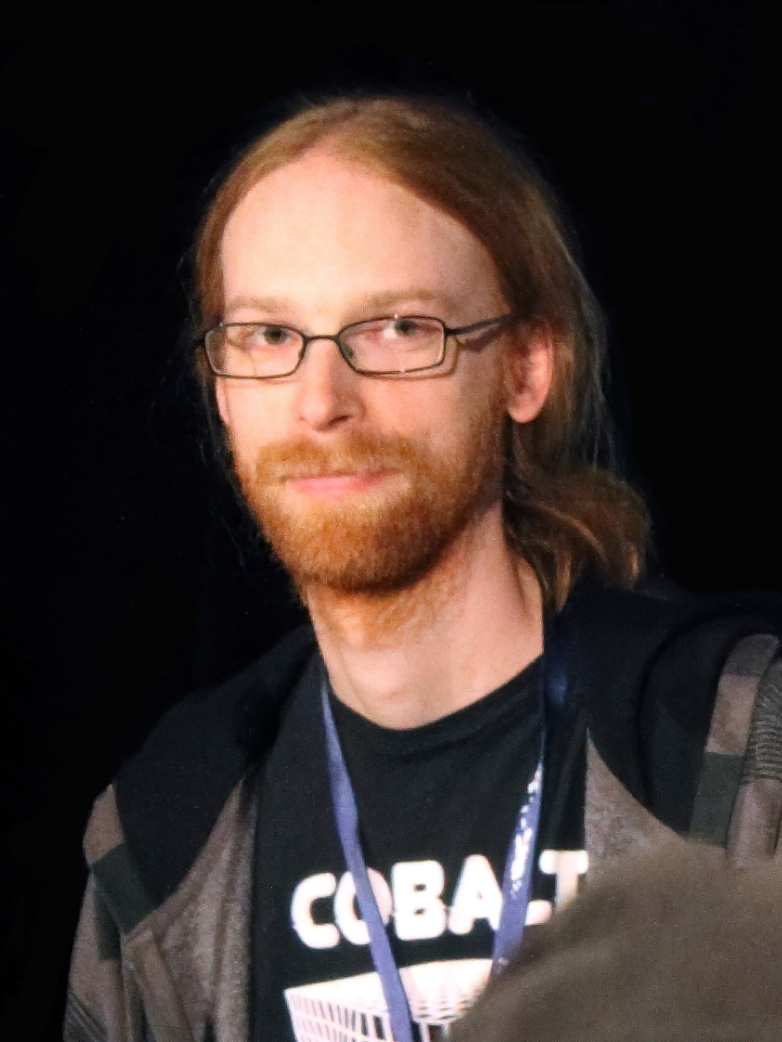
Jens "Jeb" Bergensten, the lead designer of Minecraft

The development of the 2011 sandbox game Minecraft spans over 17 years and multiple major updates. Originally started in May 2009 by Markus "Notch" Persson as a small personal project, the game quickly became popular on forums, prompting Persson to continue updating it. Over the course of its development, Minecraft's public beta amassed over 4 million sales by 7 November 2011. Minecraft would eventually release on 18 November 2011.

After the full release in 2011, Minecraft has been receiving various updates that add new features into the game for no additional cost. After Microsoft's acquisition of Mojang Studios (formerly known as Mojang AB) in 2014, the pace of major update releases was briefly halted, before resuming the cycle in 2016. In 2017, after the unification of the console and mobile ports of the game, the original PC version of Minecraft was renamed to Minecraft: Java Edition. In 2024, annual updates were partially replaced by "game drops" that focus on smaller but more frequent additions.

Outside of major and minor updates, preview builds named "snapshots" are available in the Minecraft Launcher and are released weekly. Certain versions and snapshots are unavailable to play via the launcher, with some considered lost and others archived online.

== Background ==
Before creating Minecraft, Persson was a game developer at King, where he primarily developed browser games and learned several programming languages. During his free time, he prototyped his own games, often drawing inspiration from other titles, and was an active participant on the TIGSource forums for independent developers. Around March 2009, Persson left King and joined jAlbum, while continuing to work on his prototypes. As the profits from sales of Minecraft's public alpha version began overshadowing his day job wage, he resigned from jAlbum in 2010 in order to be able to work on the game full time. With the revenue generated from the game, Persson founded Mojang, a video game studio, alongside former colleagues Jakob Porser and Carl Manneh.

Following the full release, Persson transferred creative control of Minecraft to Jens Bergensten and began working on another project called 0x10c, though it was later abandoned. In 2014, Persson decided to sell Mojang, stating that he became exhausted with developing Minecraft due to the intense media attention and public pressure. After Microsoft purchased Mojang for $2.5 billion, he left the company alongside Porser and Manneh.

== Pre-release (2009–2011) ==
=== Pre-Classic ===
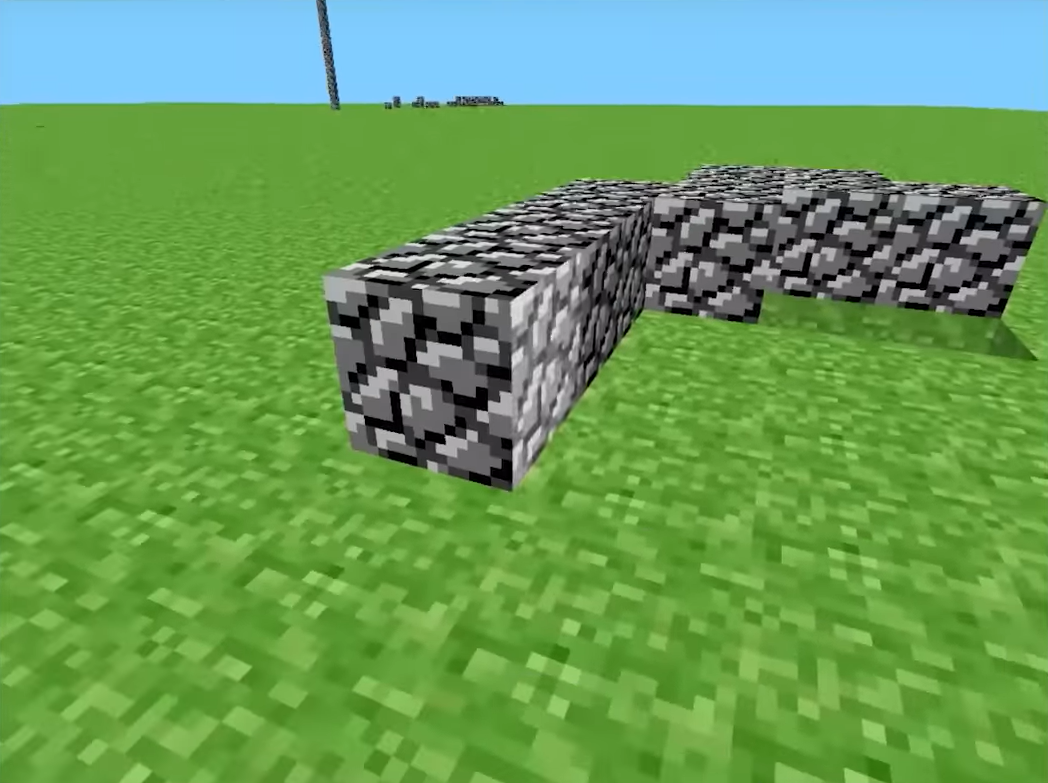
Cave Game, one of the first versions of Minecraft

The first known versions of Minecraft, then known as Cave Game, were developed by Markus Persson in May 2009. The game world consisted of grass and cobblestone blocks, which could be placed and removed. The gameplay was inspired by Infiniminer and an earlier project of Persson, RubyDung. On 13 May, the first available footage of the game was released online via a YouTube video titled "Cave game tech test", uploaded by Persson himself.

On 17 May, a more refined build of the game was published on the TIGSource forums. The game was renamed to Minecraft: Order of the Stone based on user feedback, later shortened to Minecraft, omitting the subtitle.

=== Classic ===
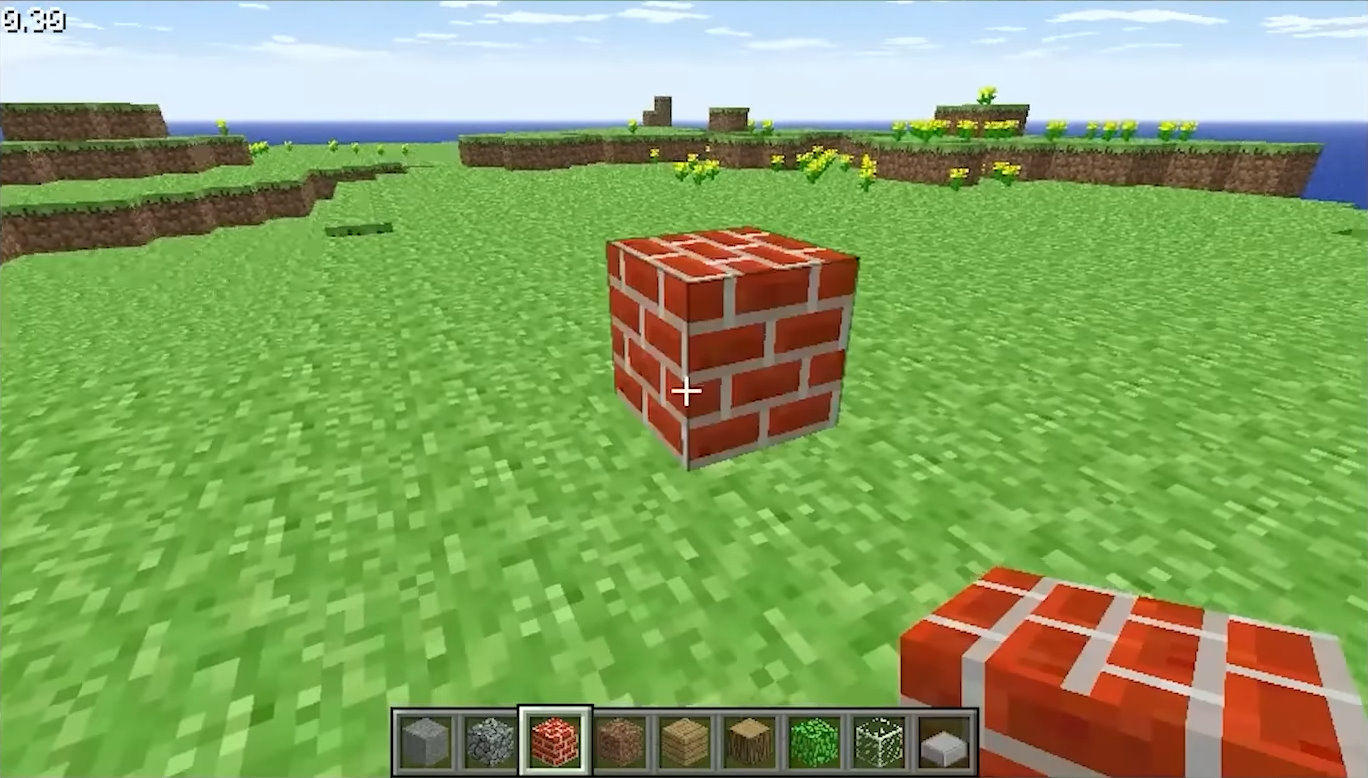
Screenshot of Minecraft Classic

Following Minecraft's release on TIGSource, Persson began updating the game based on the response from the forum users, with the subsequent builds later referred to as Minecraft Classic. Various branches of Classic have been released, such as Multiplayer Test and Survival Test, with the former implementing multiplayer capabilities into the game and the latter giving the player a health bar and adding hostile monsters, including zombies, skeletons and creepers.

Ambient music tracks that play sparsely during the gameplay were added during Classic, composed by German musician Daniel Rosenfeld, known professionally as C418, who became active on TIGSource in 2007 where he met Persson. Rosenfeld wanted to "make something organic and partly electronic, partly acoustic" for the music of Minecraft. The soundtrack's minimalistic style was also due to technical constraints, as he admitted the game "has a terrible sound engine." The game's soundtrack, Minecraft – Volume Alpha, would later be released in March 2011.

On 7 May 2019, coinciding with Minecraft's 10th anniversary, a JavaScript recreation of Classic was made available to play online for free.

=== Indev ===
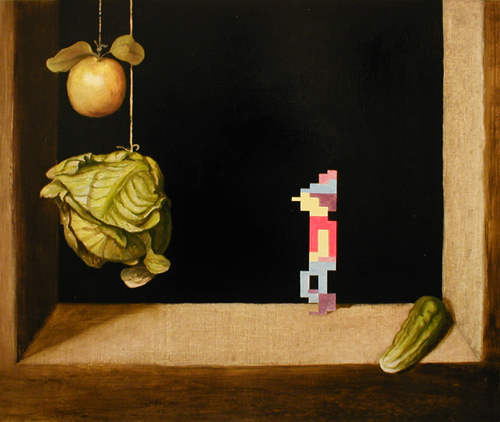
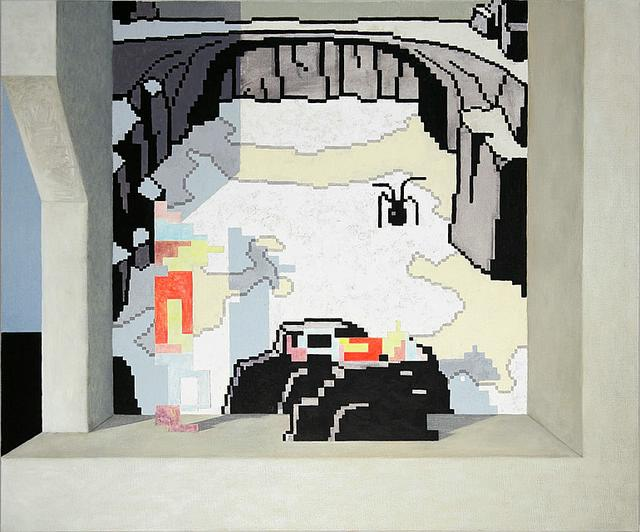
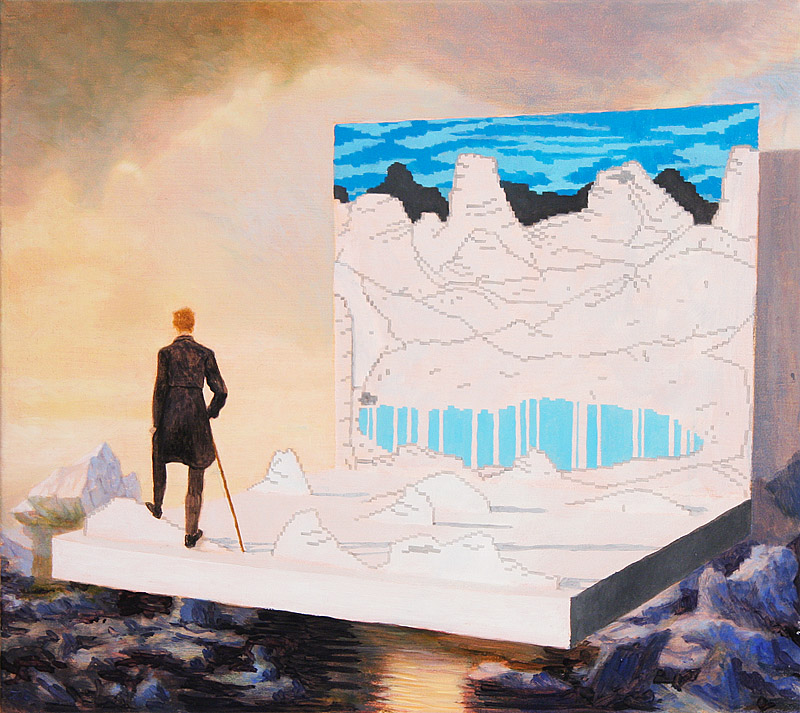
Various paintings by Zetterstrand that were added to Minecraft

On 23 December 2009, following public demand, Persson made a development branch of the then planned 0.31 update publicly available to anyone with a paid account under the title Indev. This new version added dynamic lighting, and support for md3 mob models (a file format developed by id Software allowing for more complex mob models), the latter of which would be scrapped by the end of Indev's development cycle.

Persson would continue to incrementally update Indev over the course of the next two months. Development eventually went well beyond the scope of the planned 0.31 release and the version number was dropped entirely.

The most notable additions of Indev was crafting and smelting, core features that still define the gameplay loop of Survival Mode to this day. Other features added to this time include tools, farming, a day-night cycle, and a set of (ultimately scrapped) world customisation options.

The final update to Indev came on 23 February 2010, adding paintings drawn by Swedish artist Kristoffer Zetterstrand.

=== Infdev ===
On 27 February 2010, Persson began experimenting with infinite worlds and started a new development branch called Infdev.

=== Alpha ===
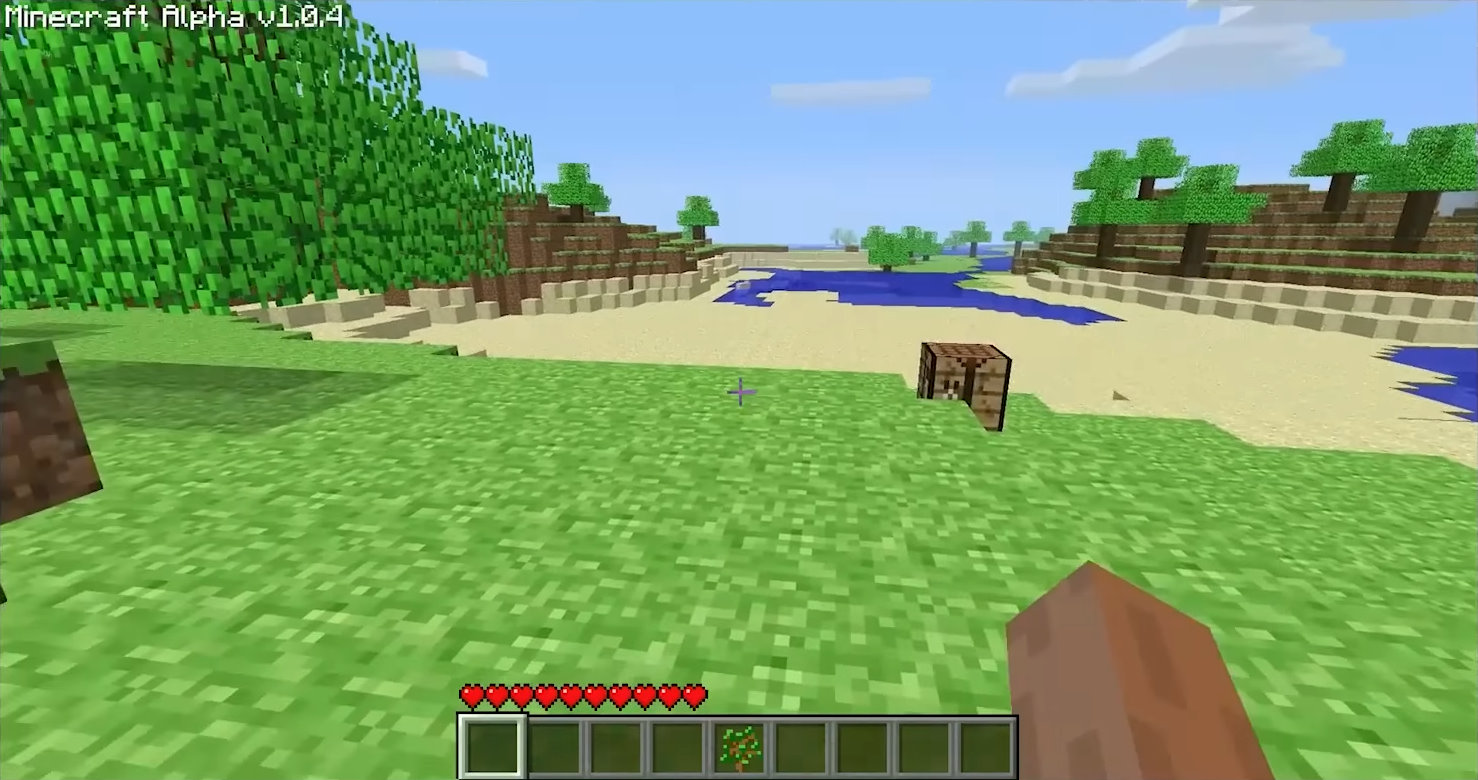
Screenshot from Minecraft Alpha

Minecraft entered the Alpha phase on 30 June 2010. In a 2010 interview, Persson said "[...] the vision for Minecraft was very similar to where Minecraft alpha [was then], but I focused on just getting the engine written and making sure that the controls felt smooth." During the alpha stage, updates were frequent and sometimes released with no warning. Notable additions include redstone, a material capable of transmitting a signal used to change state of various blocks, such as opening doors and turning on lamps. Redstone is turing complete and has been used by players to create complex mechanisms, including computers.

==== Alpha v1.2.0: "Halloween Update" ====
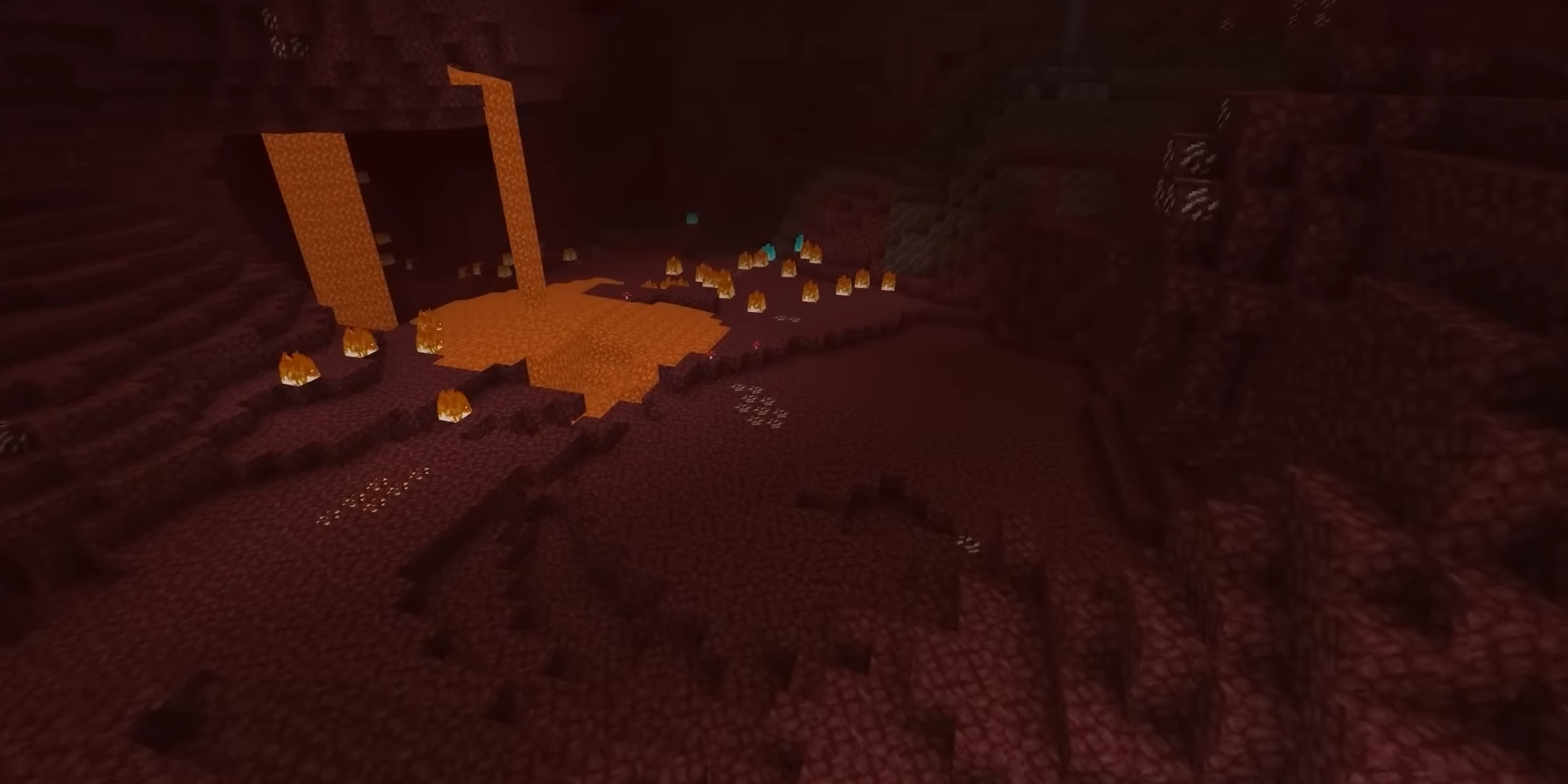
The Nether was added in Alpha v1.2.0.

Released on 30 October 2010, Alpha v1.2.0 added various biomes to the world, such as deserts, forests and snowy tundras, as well as a hell-like dimension called the Nether, accessed through a player-made portal, composed mainly of lava and populated with dangerous monsters such as the fireball-shooting Ghasts.

=== Beta ===
Minecraft entered the Beta phase on 20 December 2010, with Beta 1.0 introducing throwable eggs and leaf decay. The game's price was subsequently raised from €10 to €14.75. Throughout 2011, various features were added, such as beds, tameable wolves, maps, trapdoors and redstone-powered pistons. In January 2011, Minecraft had sold over 1 million copies.

==== Beta 1.8: "Adventure Update Part I" ====
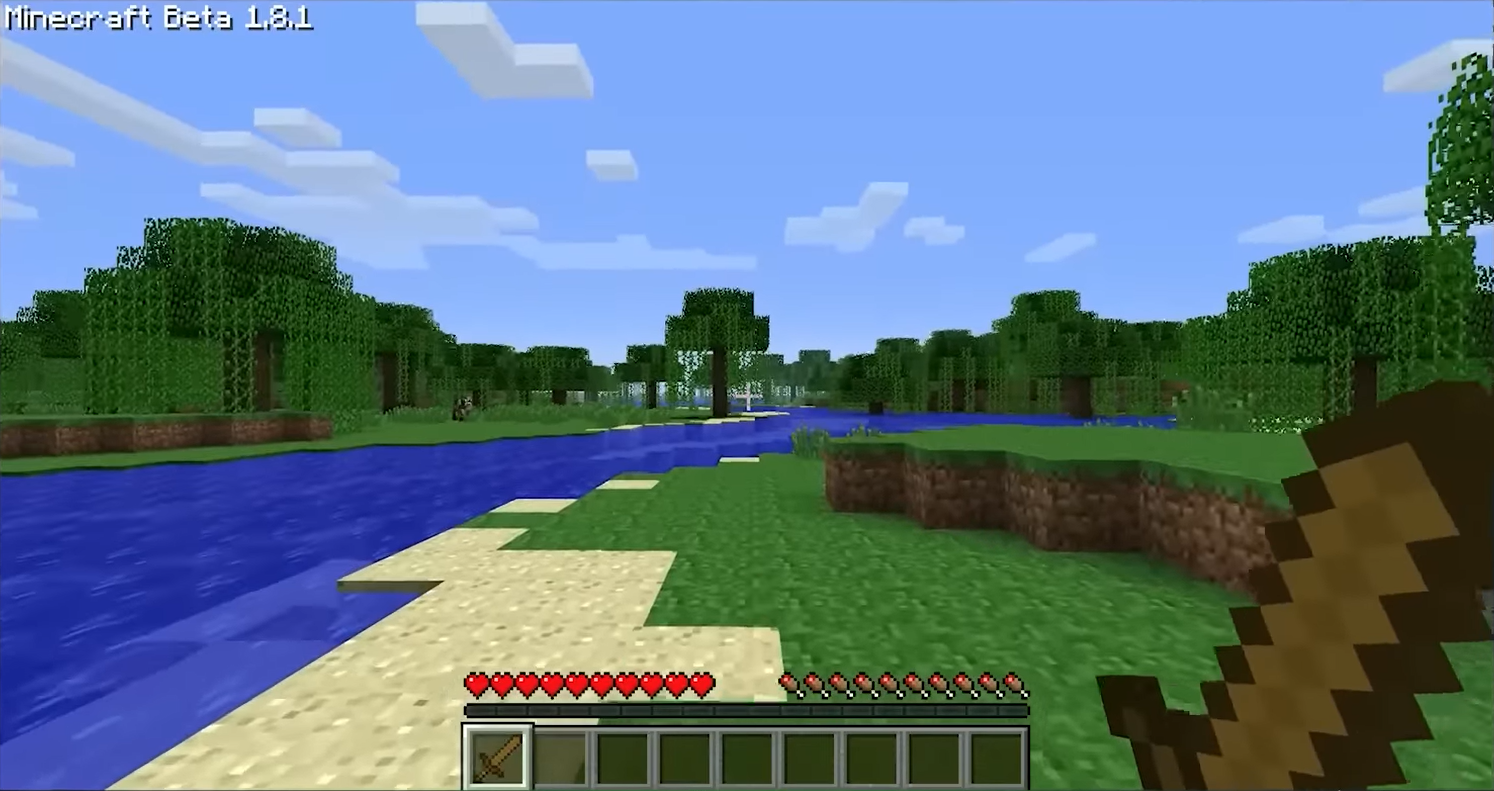
Overhauled world generation in Beta 1.8.1

Beta 1.8, titled "Adventure Update", was released on 14 September 2011. The update reworked the world generation, adding new biomes, structures and terrain features, such as ravines. Villages were added, though they would not be populated until the next update. Player movement and combat was overhauled, giving the player the ability to sprint and inflict critical hits on enemies. A hunger bar was added; instead of food healing the player directly, it now replenishes the hunger bar, with player slowly healing when the bar is full and taking damage when it is empty. The update also adds creative mode, a game mode that removes survival aspects of the game, making the player invincible, able to fly and giving unlimited access to blocks, similar to Minecraft Classic.

Initially, Adventure Update was going to be released in Beta 1.7, but was later delayed due to the amount of content to Beta 1.8 and then subsequently split between two updates, Beta 1.8 and Beta 1.9, the latter becoming 1.0.0. In November 2011, Minecraft had sold over 4 million copies.

== Release and subsequent updates (2011–2014) ==
=== 1.0: "Adventure Update: Part II" ===
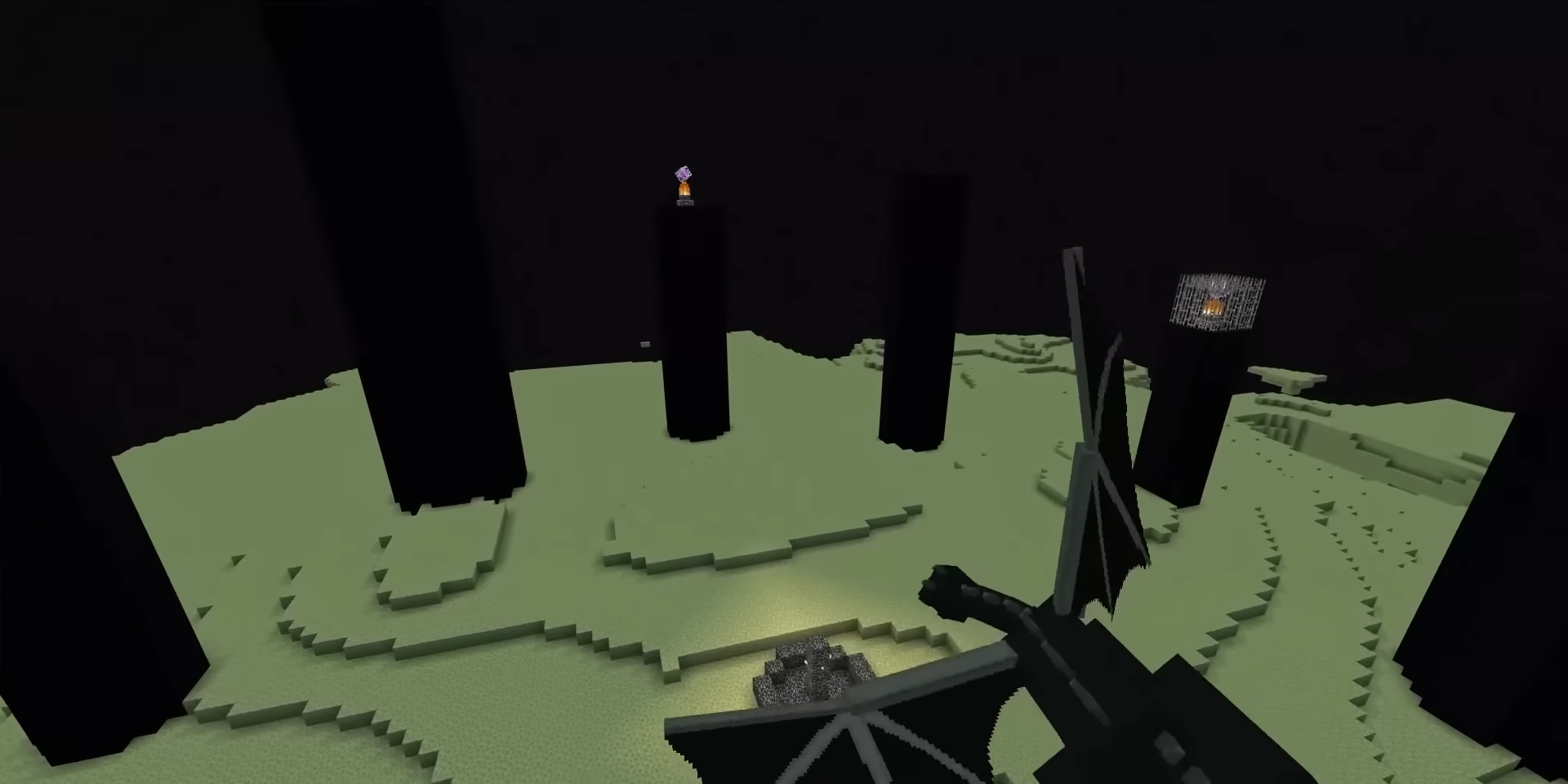
The End dimension was added in the first full version of Minecraft.

On 18 November 2011, during MineCon 2011, the first full version of Minecraft was officially released, titled "Adventure Update: Part II". It was originally planned to be released as "Beta 1.9", but was later labeled "1.0.0", signifying the full release of the game. The update added a new Mushroom biome, villager NPCs that spawn in villages and Nether fortresses. Tools, weapons, and armour could now be enchanted, providing stat increases and special effects. The update also added a brand new dimension titled The End, inspired by a cancelled sky dimension, and a final boss called the Ender Dragon that spawns in The End and opens a portal upon defeat which initiates the End Poem and a credits sequence.

=== 1.1 ===
The 1.1 update was released on 12 January 2012. It added spawn eggs that allow the player to spawn any mob, with the item being available only in creative mode. A new world type was added called "superflat", which generates an endless plain, allowing for easier building. The update also added new enchantments for bows, improved world generation and language localizations.

=== 1.2.1 ===
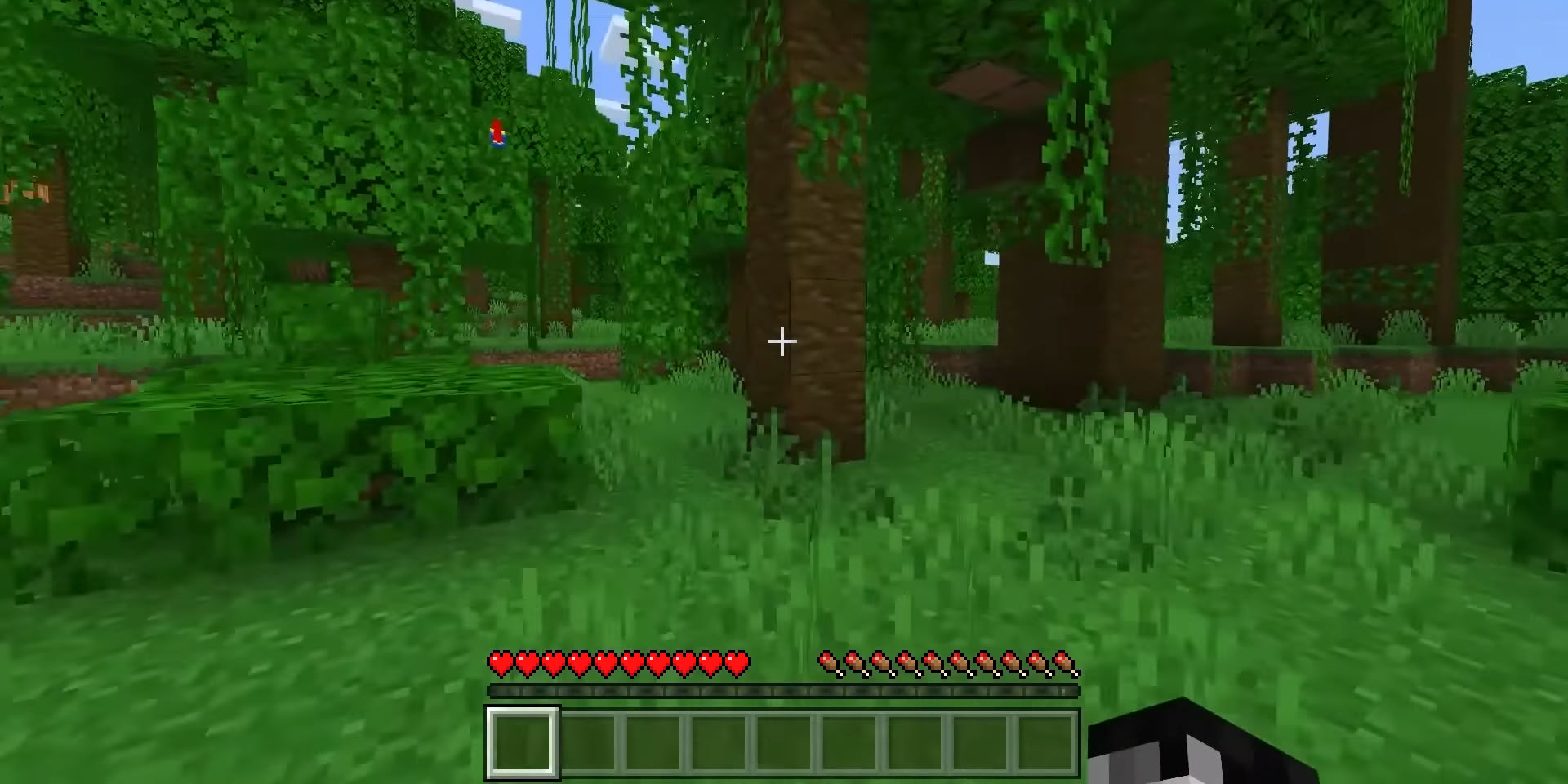
A player exploring the jungle

The 1.2.1 update was released on 1 March 2012. It added a new jungle biome that house ocelots, which could be tamed with fish, becoming a cat. Iron golems were introduced, walking around villages and protecting them from monsters. The world's height was doubled from 128 to 256 blocks, though no terrain generates above 128 blocks.

=== 1.3.1 ===
The 1.3 update was released on 1 August 2012. New dungeons were added, the desert pyramid and the jungle temple. Villager trading was introduced, along with emeralds that are used as a currency. Other new features include redstone-emitting tripwires, books that hold text written by the player, ender chests that are linked together, cocoa beans and single-player cheats. Additionally, the single-player and multiplayer codebases have been merged, raising the system requirements as "the game needs to be able to both simulate and emulate the world".

=== 1.4.2: "Pretty Scary Update" ===
On 25 October 2012, the Pretty Scary Update released. The update added new mobs such as the Wither boss and Witches, in theme for Halloween of that year. Anvils were added, used for repairing, renaming and applying enchantments to tools, weapons and armour. Other blocks were added that include item frames (picture frames that allow the display of items), flower pots and beacons, which gives the player special effects in a big radius when placed atop of a pyramid of gold, emerald, iron or diamond blocks.

=== 1.5: "Redstone Update" ===
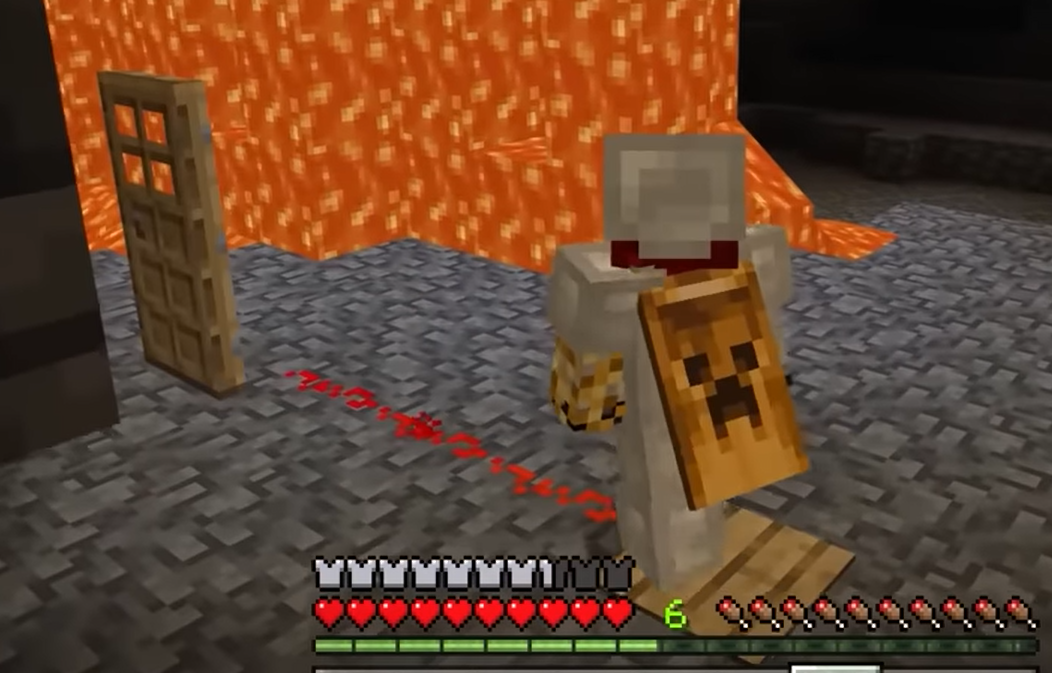
A simple redstone circuit used to open a door via a pressure plate

On 13 March 2013, the Redstone Update released. Bergensten stated that "[the update] marks the start of a series of new, more focused updates from the developer that focus on a feature or a theme." The main changes in the update are different ways that the player can make use of redstone, including a block named the "daylight detector" that can trigger circuits depending on the time of day.

=== 1.6.1: "Horse Update" ===
Released on 1 July 2013, The Horse Update added a new form of transportation with horses, donkeys and mules along with horse armour. The horses' appearance was inspired by a fanmade Minecraft mod Mo' Creatures. The update also introduced leads, carpets, terracotta, hay bales, name tags and coal blocks.

=== 1.7.2: "The Update that Changed the World" ===
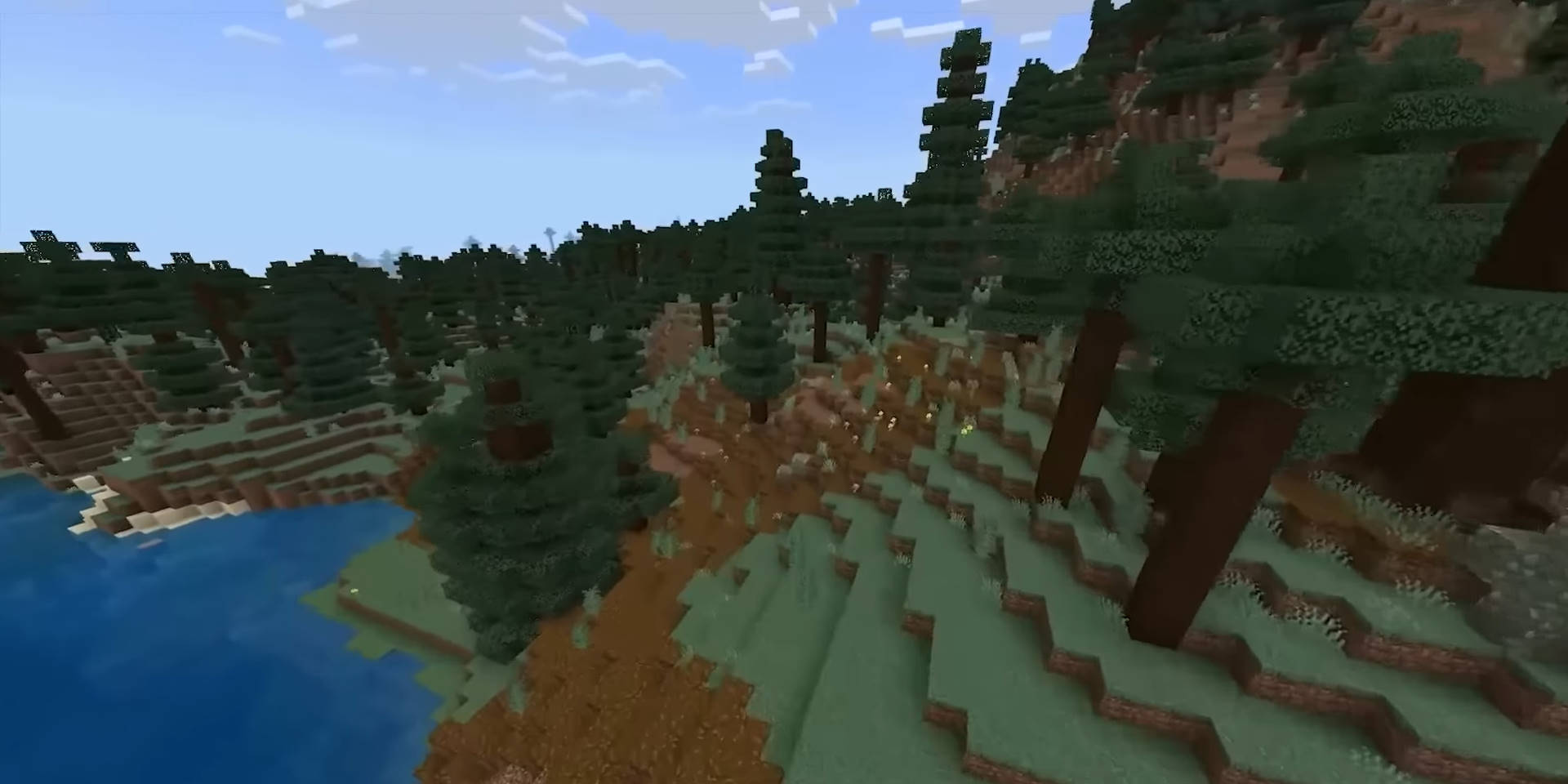
Overhauled taiga biome

The Update that Changed the World was released on 25 October 2013. The update overhauled the world generation, adding 11 new biomes such as savannas, mesas, extreme hills and various forests, along with terrain features such as packed ice, podzol and red sand. The "amplified" world type was introduced, featuring extreme terrain. Additionally, new types of fish and item frames were added.

=== 1.8: "Bountiful Update" ===
The Bountiful update released on 2 September 2014. It added the Ocean Monument alongside a new boss called the Elder Guardian, as well as rabbits, bouncy slime blocks, customizable banners and a new female default character skin, Alex. A new world type was added that allowed full customization of terrain features and structure generation. The update also updated item enchanting and repairing.

== Acquisition by Microsoft (2014–2023) ==
Following Microsoft's acquisition of Mojang AB and Persson's subsequent departure from the company, no new major updates were released until February 2016.

=== 1.9: "Combat Update" ===
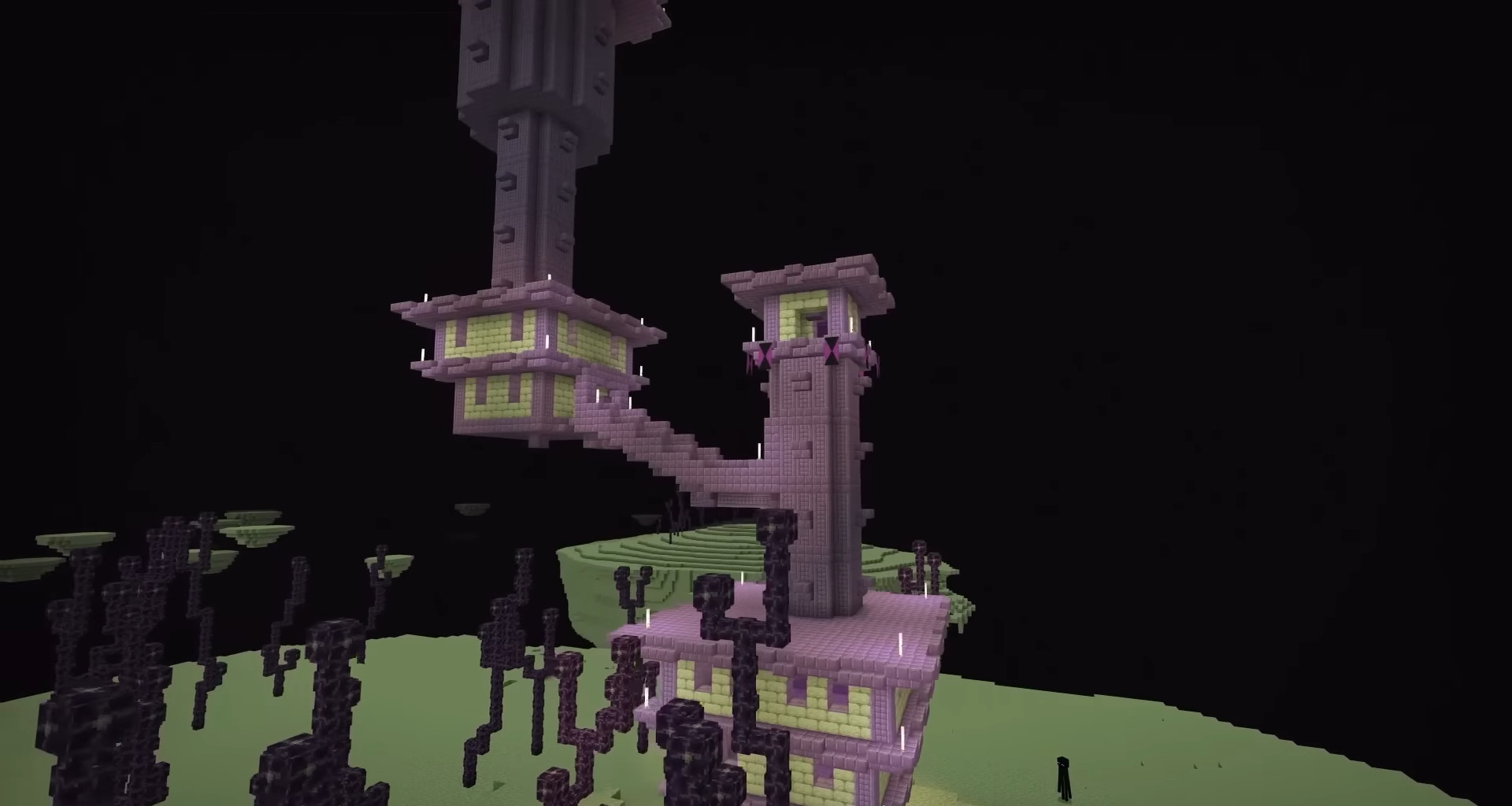
End city was added in 1.9.

Teased in the 2015 April Fools' Day update and released on 29 February 2016, the Combat Update aimed to improve Minecraft's combat mechanics as well as expand the End dimension. Swords and axes were assigned a cooldown, making players unable to attack rapidly. Dual wielding was introduced, allowing the players to equip any item in their "off-hand" slot, including a brand new shield item that absorbs most enemy damage. The End dimension was expanded, with the player being able to visit more end islands after defeating the Ender Dragon on the main island. End cities can be found on these islands, which contain powerful loot, including an equippable set of elytra that allows the player to glide in the air.

The reception to the combat changes was controversial, with certain users and community-run servers opting not to update to 1.9. Bergensten stated that "the combat system wasn't very interesting and we simply wanted to give it a little bit more variation", noting that the changes were "almost universally hated by the PVP community".

=== 1.10: "Frostburn Update" ===
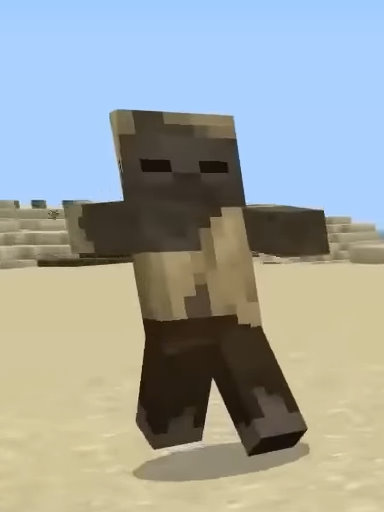
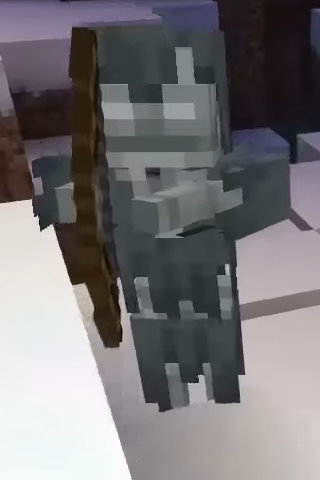
Husk (left) and Stray (right) are variants of zombies and skeletons respectively.

The Frostburn Update, released on 8 June 2016, adds additional biome-dependent variants for zombies and skeletons, polar bears, Nether magma blocks, fossils, as well as improvements for world generation and mob spawning.

=== 1.11: "Exploration Update" ===
The Exploration Update was released on 14 November 2016. A new structure was added, the woodland mansion that houses illagers, a hostile version of villagers that attack villagers and the player. Dropped from the magic-powered evoker illagers, Totems of Undying can prevent an otherwise fatal event when held by the player. A new villager type called the cartographer was added who sells maps that lead to various structures. Other additions include llamas, a portable chest item called the Shulker Box and cursed enchantments.

=== 1.12: "World of Color Update" ===
The World of Color was released on 7 June 2017 and added new concrete and terracotta blocks, as well as tameable parrots. It also improved various colored blocks, making them more vibrant. The achievement system originally added in Beta was replaced with advancements, which give the player experience points for completing them.

On 20 September 2017, the Better Together update was released for Windows 10, console and mobile ports of Minecraft, unifying them under the name Minecraft: Bedrock Edition. Following the update, the original PC version was renamed to Minecraft: Java Edition.

=== 1.13: "Update Aquatic" ===
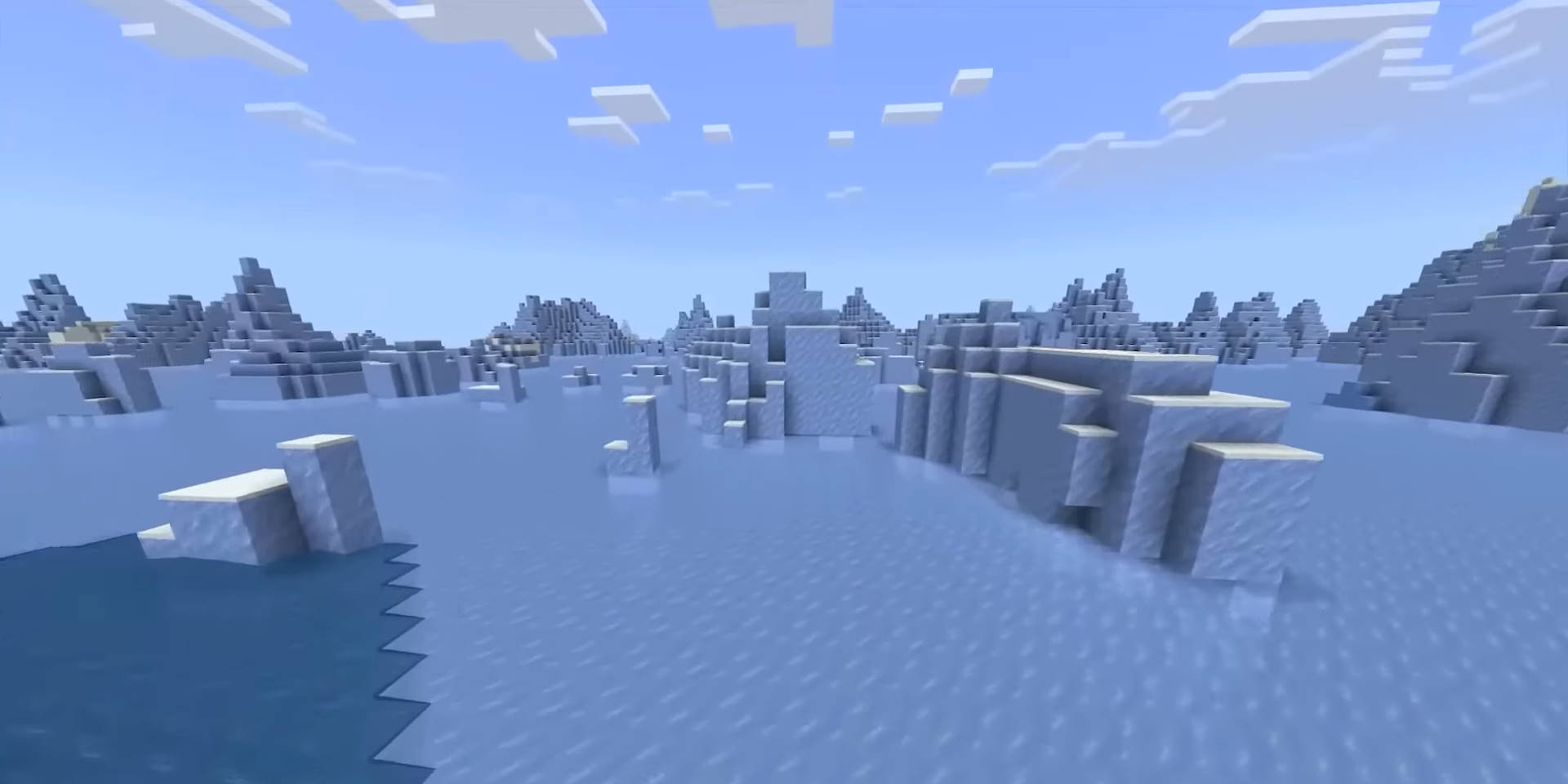
A reworked frozen ocean in Update Aquatic

Update Aquatic, an ocean overhaul, was released on 18 July 2018. The update made oceans more varied and added various biomes and structures, such as seagrass, coral reefs, icebergs, buried treasures and shipwrecks that contain loot. Fish, which were previously only available as items, were introduced as a mob that could be captured in a bucket. A new underwater zombie variant was added, the Drowned, that has a rare chance to spawn with a throwable trident weapon that can be looted and used by the player. Sea turtles were introduced, producing scutes that are used to craft a helmet that extends the amount of time the player can survive underwater without oxygen. Other additions include dolphins, blue ice and improved swimming mechanics.

=== 1.14: "Village & Pillage" ===
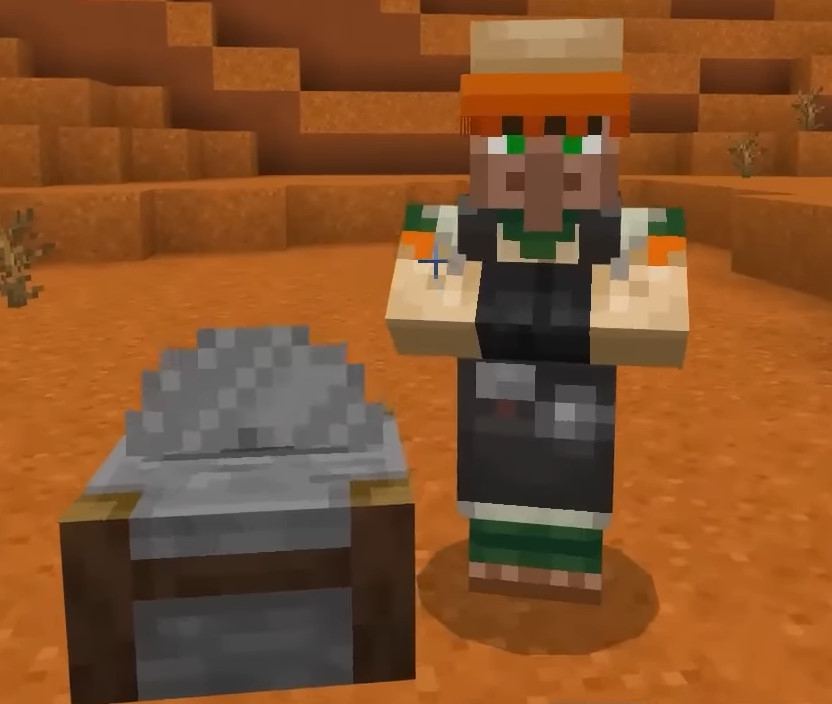
A mason villager next to a stonecutter, their job block

Released on 23 April 2019, the Village & Pillage update focused on improving the villages and villager NPCs as well as adding a new raid event. Villagers were reworked to behave more realistically and have their trades be dependent on their "job block", instead of their profession being selected randomly on spawn. A raid event was added, with villages now being vulnerable to attack from illagers. The update also introduced biome-dependent villages and villager clothes, as well as pandas, foxes, crossbows, campfires, sweet berries, and bamboo.

=== 1.15: "Buzzy Bees" ===
The Buzzy Bees update was released on 10 December 2019. The update added bees that can be found in forests and are neutral to the player, becoming aggressive when provoked and dying shortly after a sting. They can pollinate flowers and bring honey to their nest or a player crafted beehive. Honey collected in bottles can be used to craft honey blocks, which are used in conjunction with pistons to push adjacent blocks similarly to slime blocks, though slime and honey blocks do not stick. In addition, honey blocks suppress fall damage and make the player slide down the sides of the block; these mechanics were used by the players to make parkour maps. Various mods have been released that change the appearance of bees.

=== 1.16: "Nether Update" ===
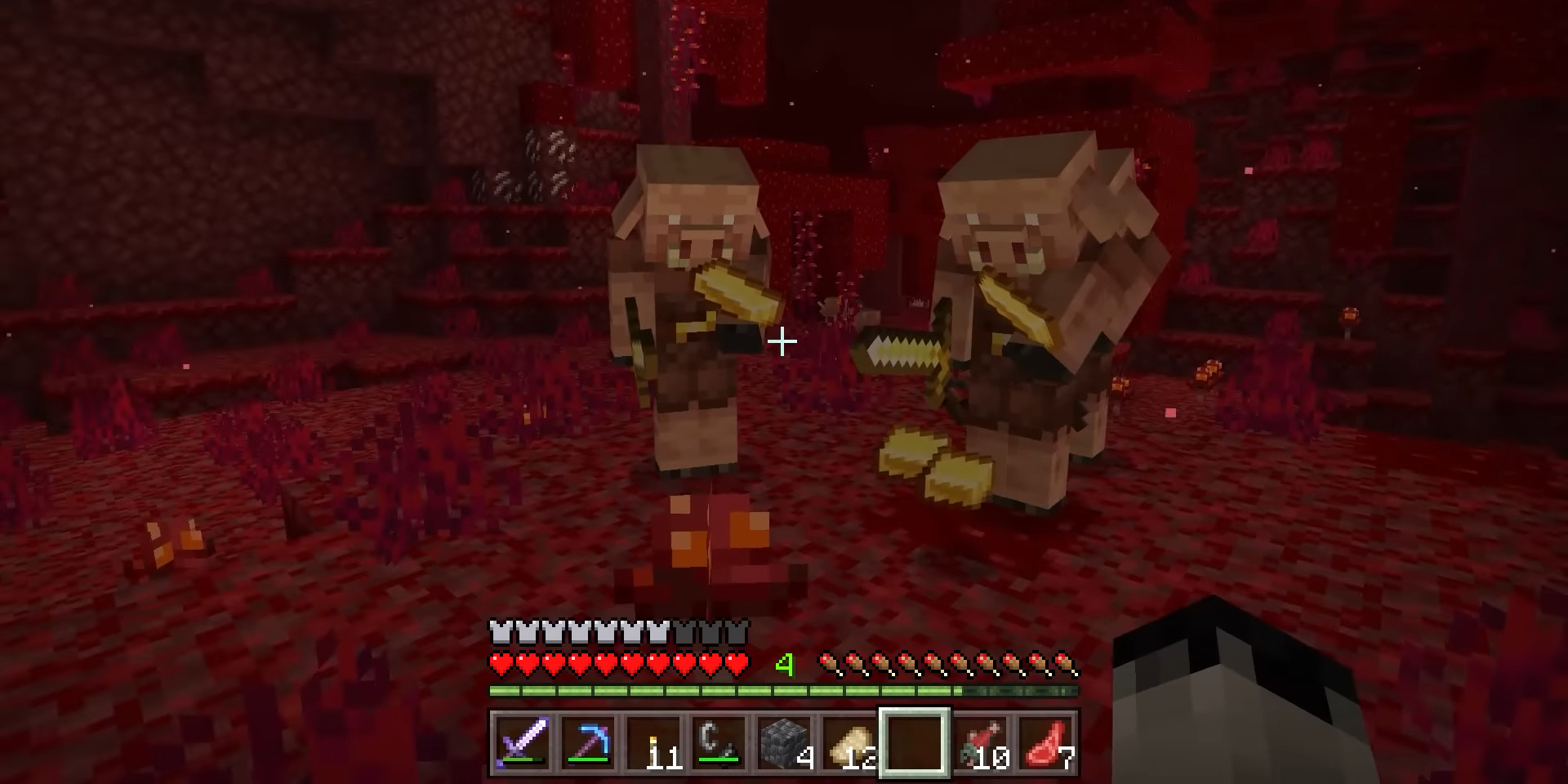
Piglins bartering for gold in a crimson forest biome

The Nether Update was released on 23 June 2020. The update centered around updating the Nether dimension, making it more varied and useful. New Nether biomes were added, such as soul sand valleys, basalt deltas and crimson and warped forests. Zombie pigmen had their appearance changed slightly and were renamed to zombified piglins. Regular piglins were added, hostile to the player unless one wears gold armour. They can be bartered with by giving them gold in exchange for various items. The update also introduced striders, a passive mob that can be ridden to safely traverse lava.

Bastion remnants were added to the Nether, housing hostile piglin brutes and chests with valuable loot, including a brand new music disc "Pigstep". The music disc, along with new ambient music tracks that play in the Nether, were composed by Lena Raine and appear in the soundtrack album Minecraft: Nether Update (Original Game Soundtrack). Netherite, a brand new Nether-exclusive material, is used to upgrade diamond armour and tools, making them more durable and fireproof. Additionally, the update added respawn anchors that enables the player to respawn in the Nether after death (beds blow up in the Nether when used), target blocks that emit redstone signal, lodestone blocks and the originally-scrapped crying obsidian blocks.

=== 1.17: "Caves & Cliffs: Part I" ===
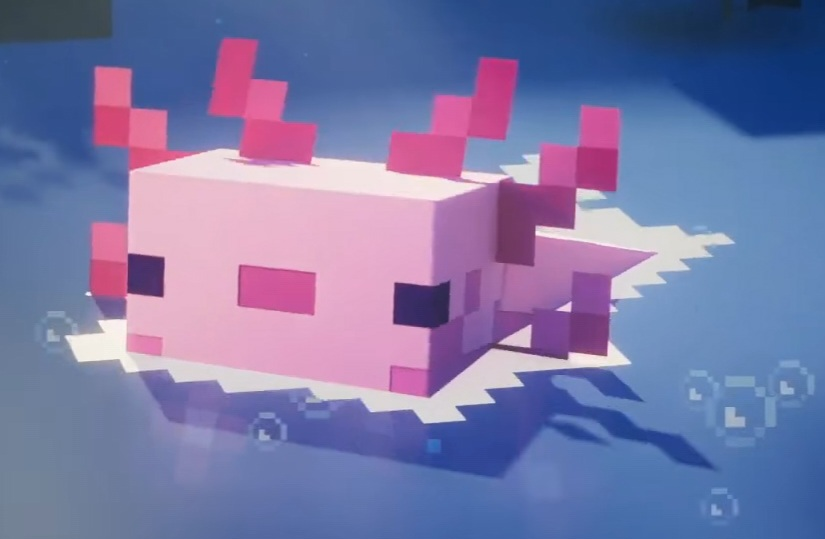
An axolotl, as depicted in the Caves & Cliffs update trailer

Announced during Minecraft Live 2020, the Caves & Cliffs update was originally supposed to release in full in Summer 2021, but was split into two smaller updates due to the team not wanting to rush what they described as the "most ambitious update" yet, the COVID-19 pandemic affecting the workflow, as well as technical challenges due to the maximum world height being increased.

Caves & Cliffs: Part I released on 8 June 2021. The update added axolotls, who were added following Mojang Studios' trend of adding endangered species to the game to raise awareness and quickly became a fan favourite feature of the update. Other new mobs include mountain goats and aquifer-inhabiting glow squids, the latter of which controversially won the previous year's mob vote that was allegedly rigged by the Minecraft YouTuber Dream.

Copper was added, collected from underground ores and used to craft decorative copper blocks, lightning rods and spyglasses. Copper blocks placed in the world oxidize over time, with the color gradually turning from orange to teal; the process can be stopped at any stage of oxidization by waxing the block using honeycomb. New cave flora was also added, including moss, glow lichens, spore blossoms, glow berries, dripleaves and azalea. Amethyst could be found underground in geodes consisting of smooth basalt and calcite. Additionally, the update adds dripstone stalactites and stalagmites, tuff, candles and powder snow.

=== 1.18: "Caves & Cliffs: Part II" ===
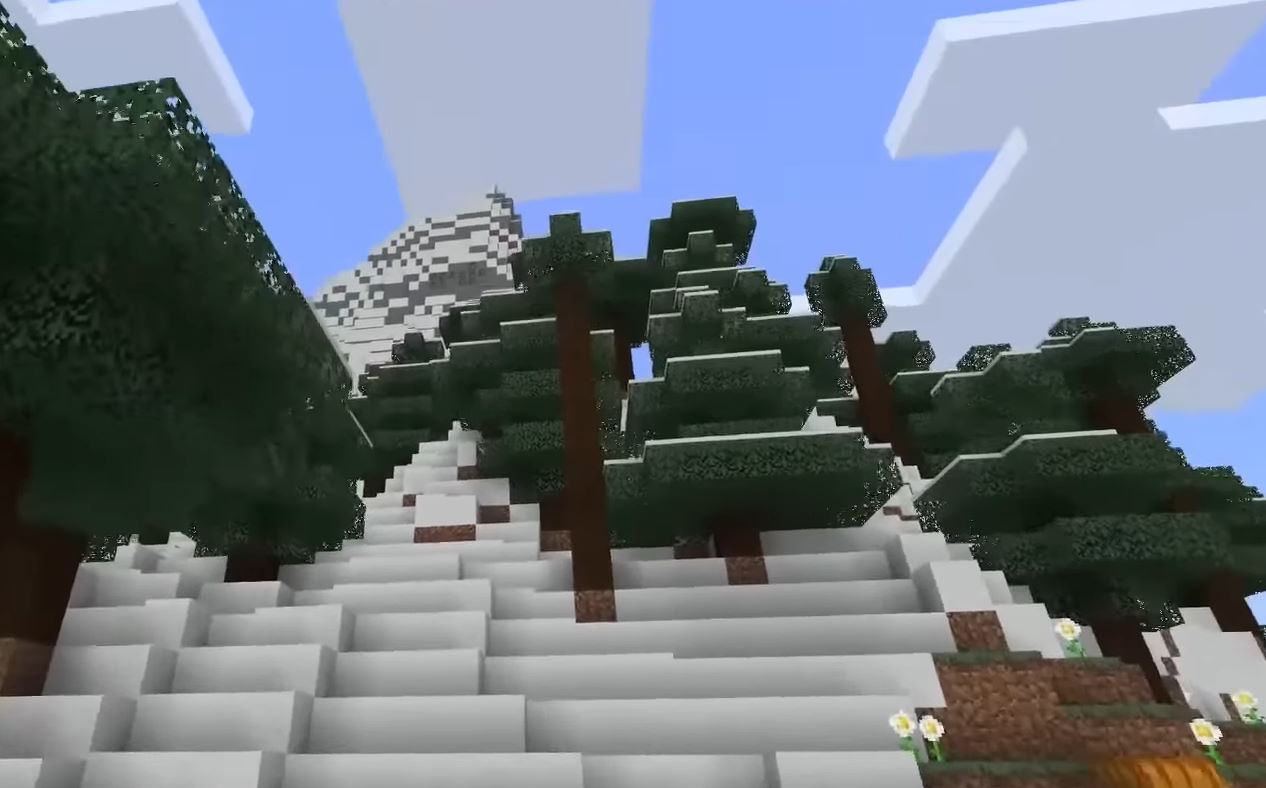
Overhauled mountains

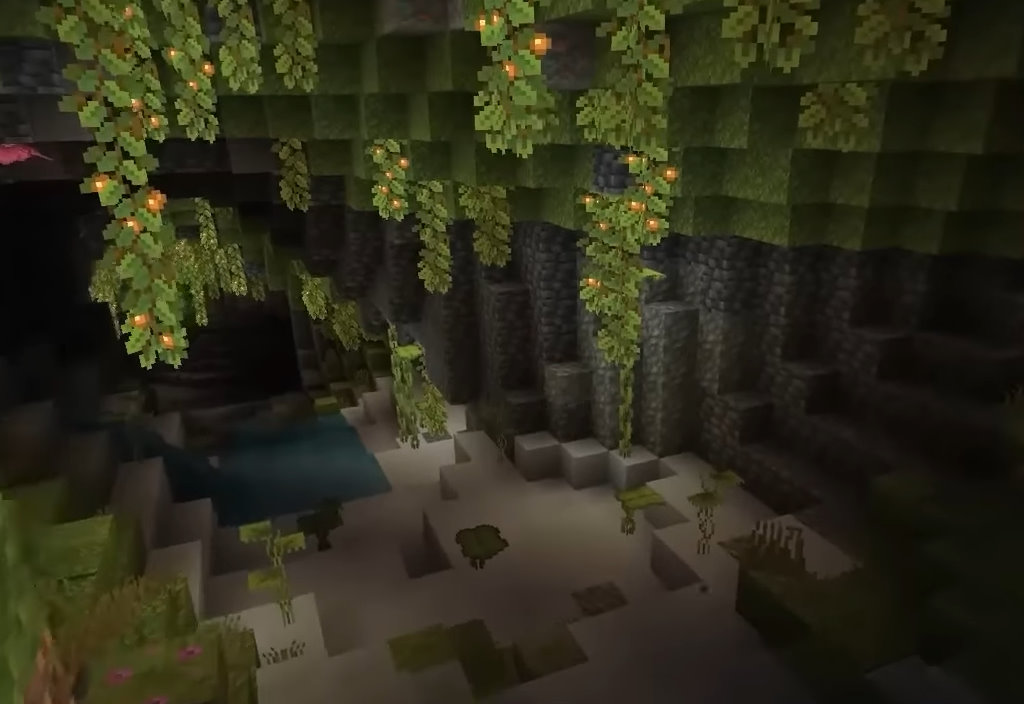
A lush caves biome

Caves & Cliffs: Part II released on 30 November 2021. The update reworked the world generation to be more expansive, with higher mountains and deeper caves, along with new biomes for both. To achieve such change, the world height was increased from 256 to 384 blocks, 64 blocks up and down. Mountains were changed to have a gradual biome shift, along with making them higher and featuring more defined peaks. Caves were expanded, featuring more varied generation, larger aquifers and new biomes, such as lush caves and dripstone caves. A mysterious and dangerous Deep Dark cave biome, archaeology features, and bundles were also set to appear, but were later postponed to The Wild Update, Trails & Tales and Bundles of Bravery updates respectively. New music by Lena Raine and Samuel Åberg was composed for the update and later released as Minecraft: The Wild Update (Original Game Soundtrack).

Speaking at the Game Developers Conference in March 2026, Minecraft's general manager Ryan Cooper likened the update's development process to "trying to build a skyscraper with hand tools," stating that Caves & Cliffs was split a result of overambition as well as having to work on both the technical and creative side of the game, which, in turn, discouraged Mojang Studios from developing large-scale updates and resulted in the switch to smaller but more frequent "drops" in 2023.

=== 1.19: "The Wild Update" ===
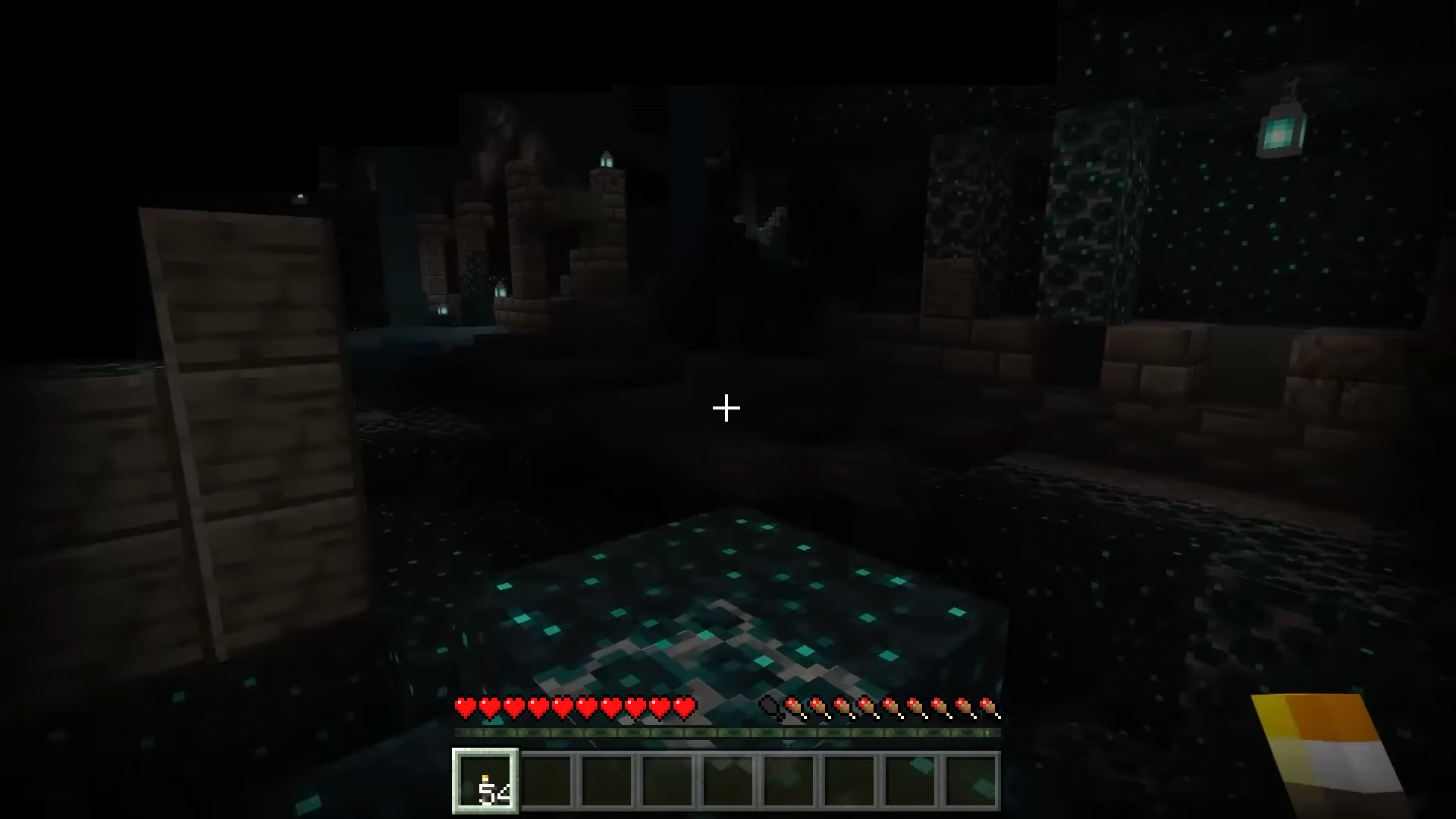
Deep Dark was added in 1.19, originally planned for 1.17.

The Wild Update was released on 7 June 2022. It added two new biomes, mangrove swamp and Deep Dark, the latter of which was originally planned for release in the Caves & Cliffs update. It also added a new type of wood, mud blocks, boats with chests, frogs and tadpoles.

The update was originally going to add fireflies that could be eaten by frogs, but the feature was scrapped due to fireflies being poisonous to frogs in real life, with game director Agnes Larsson stating that "if we release a feature like fireflies that are poisonous to frogs and we have frogs eating them, that actually might lead to people killing their real life frogs". A concept art of a reworked birch forest biome was also showed during the update's reveal, but the biome was not touched in the update. These actions led to criticism, with various users nicknaming the update "The Mild Update" due to the amount of content added deemed insufficient. Fireflies would be eventually added in the "Spring to Life" game drop released in 2025.

==== 1.19.1 and the chat reporting controversy ====
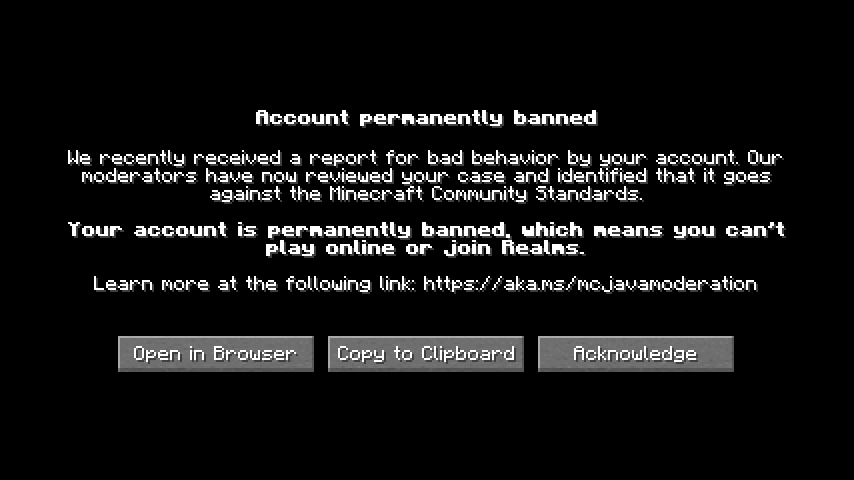
Message seen by banned players when attempting to connect to a multiplayer server

Released on 28 June 2022, update 1.19.1 added a feature that allows players to report chat messages by other players for inappropriate or dangerous behavior. The reports are manually reviewed by Mojang Studios employees and can lead to the reported player getting banned from playing all multiplayer servers if they are found to be in violation of Xbox Community Standards. The feature was widely criticized by the players; some pointed out that it is possible to be reported on one's own server, others opined that chat monitoring may lead to further censorship and dubbed the update "1.19.84", referencing the dystopian novel Nineteen Eighty-Four. Community manager MojangMeesh responded to criticism on Reddit, stating that the system is not going to be changed or reverted despite the feedback and asking people not to harass other employees; his comment received almost 2,000 downvotes. Various mods have been created to circumvent chat reporting.

=== 1.20: "Trails & Tales" ===
Trails & Tales update trailer

The Trails & Tales update was announced during Minecraft Live 2022 as an unnamed upcoming update and was released on 7 June 2023. The update added cherry blossoms, along with bamboo planks. Originally planned for 1.17, archaeology was introduced, with the player being able to excavate items from suspicious sand and gravel near certain structures using a brush. The buried items include pottery sherds used to craft ceramic pots with art, and sniffer eggs, which slowly hatch into a sniffer, a new fictional mob able to dig out items from soil otherwise unavailable to the player. Additionally, camels, decorative armour trims, hanging signs and chiseled bookshelves were added.

== Switch to game drops (2023–2025) ==
In September 2023, Mojang Studios announced its switch from major annual updates to "game drops" that release more frequently, stating that "alongside these regular content drops, our developers will be focusing on long-term initiatives to ensure we can continue to evolve Minecraft long into the future".

=== 1.20.3: "Bats and Pots" ===
The first ever seasonal game drop was released on 5 December 2023, retroactively named "Bats and Pots" after the release of "Armored Paws". The drop added more functionality to pots added in the previous update, making them able to store items and break when hit with a projectile. The design of bats were also redesigned.

=== 1.20.5: "Armored Paws" ===
Released on 23 April 2024, the Armored Paws game drop added armadillos, the previous year's mob vote winner, as well as new biome-specific variants for wolf. Armadillos are scared of players and roll up into a ball when approached or hurt. Armadillo scutes can be brushed off the animal using a brush. The scutes are used to craft wolf armour.

=== 1.21: "Tricky Trials" ===
The Tricky Trials update was released on 13 June 2024 and became the last yearly update before a complete switch to game drops. New underground dungeons were added called the trial chambers, containing mob spawners and valuable loot. Going into the dungeon with a bad omen status effect increases the difficulty of the encounters, giving enemies better armour and weapons, while also increasing the quality of loot. Maces were introduced, crafted using heavy cores obtained from trial chambers. The damage inflicted by the weapon is proportional to the amount of distance fallen, with a successful hit negating fall damage. Breezes could be found in trial chambers, dealing little damage but high knockback, with their projectiles being able to activate redstone-powered traps. The mob drops wind charges, which can be used by the player to knock mobs back or propel oneself into the air, akin to rocket jumping. New copper blocks were added, with most being used in the trial chambers. The update also added a redstone-powered automated crafting table, new music discs, armour trims, and additional paintings, most of which were done by Zetterstrand, who created the original set of Minecraft's paintings.

=== 1.21.2: "Bundles of Bravery" ===
The Bundles of Bravery game drop was released on 22 October 2024. It added bundles that are able to hold up to 64 different items in a single inventory slot. The bundles can also be dyed.

=== 1.21.4: "The Garden Awakens" ===
Announced alongside Bundles of Bravery, The Garden Awakens game drop was released on 3 December 2024. It added a rare forest biome named the pale garden. The biome has a grey, desaturated look and no ambient music plays inside the biome. A new hostile mob called the Creaking was introduced. Creakings spawn in the pale garden during night and attack players who are not looking at it, otherwise standing completely still. The mob cannot be damaged directly; killing the mob requires destroying the creaking heart found inside trees. The Creaking drops resin upon death, which can be crafted into resin bricks. Various sources noted the horror theme of the update, with PC Gamer describing the Creaking as "uncanny" and Eurogamer comparing the mob to Weeping Angels from the British television series Doctor Who.

=== 1.21.5: "Spring to Life" ===
The Spring to Life game drop was released on 25 March 2025. It added new environment blocks, including bushes, dry grass, cactus flowers and leaf litter, as well as new ambient sounds for various biomes. Fireflies were added, an ambient feature originally slated for release for The Wild Update in 2022. Additionally, new biome-specific variants for chickens, cows and pigs and were added.

=== 1.21.6: "Chase the Skies" ===
Announced during Minecraft Live 2025, the Chase the Skies game drop was released on 17 June 2025. The drop added a new mob called the happy ghast, a non-hostile variant of ghasts that can be tamed and ridden with a harness. They are obtained by rescuing dried ghasts from the Nether, and put into water in the Overworld. The update also introduced the player locator bar, overhauled lead mechanics and added two music discs, one of which being a chiptune remix by Hyper Potions of "Steve's Lava Chicken" from A Minecraft Movie obtained by killing a chicken jockey.

=== 1.21.9: "The Copper Age" ===
The Copper Age game drop was released on 30 September 2025. It added the copper golem, a player-made mob capable of moving items between chests and sorting them. Additional copper blocks such as chests, chains, lanterns and torches were also added. The shelf block was also introduced, as well as copper armour and tools.

=== 1.21.11: "Mounts of Mayhem" ===
The Mounts of Mayhem game drop was released on 9 December 2025. A new tiered spear weapon was introduced, dealing damage based on player speed. Giant rideable nautiluses were added, used for underwater traversal due to their fast speed and the ability to extend the player's breath. The update also added additional variants to mobs, such as a zombified camel variant called the Camel Husk and a desert skeleton variant named the Parched that fires arrows of weakness at the player, while also introducing zombie horses, a previously unused mob.

== Version numbering change (2026–present) ==
On 2 December 2025, Mojang Studios announced a change in Minecraft's version numbering, switching from semantic to calendar versioning starting in 2026, with the next update being labeled as 26.1 (2026, update 1). Java and Bedrock editions' update versions may differ due to Bedrock Edition receiving more general updates.

=== 26.1: "Tiny Takeover" ===
Released on 24 March 2026, the Tiny Takeover game drop adds new models for juvenile versions of mobs and introduces a golden dandelion item that temporarily prevents them from aging. The update also makes name tags craftable. Various publications and users praised the update for its "cuteness", though the comparatively small list of features received criticism.

=== 26.2: "Chaos Cubed" ===
The Chaos Cubed game drop was released on 16 June 2026. The drop adds a new sulfur cave biome made of brand new cinnabar and sulfur blocks used for decoration. The biome features aquifers with potent sulfur blocks at the bottom that make the player nauseous, as well as sulfur spikes—stalactites and stalagmites made out of sulfur. Sulfur springs appear on the surface right above sulfur caves, intended to mark the caves underneath. These usually contain a geyser that periodically erupts, propelling entities but not damaging them. Principal game designer Daniel Jansson stated that "the sulfur caves have been inspired by hot springs all over the world."

Sulfur cubes spawn in this biome, a non-hostile slime variant that can consume blocks dropped by players, causing them to halt all autonomous movement and behave like a bouncing ball when hit by players or projectiles, with the launch distance being proportional to the damage taken and the consumed block affecting his properties; for example, absorbing ice blocks greatly lowers the slime's friction. Later in development, sulfur slimes were updated to allow consumption of TNT blocks, a heavily requested community feature. Jansson noted that "there's some element of skill to be able to make it bounce the way you want, which I think adds some interesting dynamics to minigames."

=== 26.3: "Wilderness Bound" ===
The Wilderness Bound game drop was announced at the Minecraft Live May 2026 TwitchCon presentation. The update was released on 15 September 2026. The update features a new autumn-like forest biome called the dappled forest, featuring poplar trees with red, orange or yellow leaves, as well as shelf mushrooms that function like a slime block, bouncing the player and reducing fall damage. An abandoned camp structure is added to every biome, containing various early-game loot. Cushions are introduced as a furniture block that can be sat on. A straw bed is added that allows sleeping without resetting the player's spawn point. Additionally, stairs and slabs made out of wool and concrete are introduced.

== Upcoming content ==
=== Combat Tests ===
From 2019 to 2020, a new branch of snapshots was developed, named the Combat Tests. The snapshots experimented with changing various combat mechanics, with the goal of making a combat system for both Java and Bedrock editions of Minecraft, fixing the disparity between the versions.

=== Vibrant Visuals ===
Vibrant Visuals is an optional graphics overhaul originally introduced to Bedrock Edition in the Chase the Skies drop. It updates and refreshes the look of the game, introducing modern rendering features such as dynamic shadows, physically based rendering, screen space reflections, volumetric fog and bloom. It is scheduled to release on Java Edition with testing planned in 2026. The game's graphics API was switched from OpenGL to Vulkan to allow for increased graphical capabilities and performance, as well as due to the upcoming discontinuation of OpenGL on macOS.

=== The Sift ===
It was announced on September 26, 2026 in a Minecraft Live stream that the Sift, a dimension from the then-upcoming Minecraft Dungeons II, will be officially added to vanilla Minecraft in both Java edition and Bedrock edition in 2027, serving as the newest dimension in nearly a decade-and-a-half.

=== 26.4: "Deep Freeze" ===
The "Deep Freeze" game drop was announced at Minecraft Live on September 26, 2026. The update features ice caves containing the icy structures icicles, ice crystals, and brittle ice, making it unique for PvPs. An ice ball, which can be thrown like a snowball or egg, deals damage depending on velocity unlike the snowball and egg that deal zero. The Freezing effect will be a new effect that players and mobs can received either through the new variant of Zombies called Frostbites upon hitting their target with their melee attack or splash and lingering potions and arrows of Freezing. A new disc called the Flurry music disc composed by Hyper Potions will be added too. Snow, Ice, Calcite, and Calcite Bricks received more variations for their respective block sets, including stairs, slabs, and walls.

== Omniarchive ==
Logo of Omniarchive

Omniarchive is a website and community created by HalfOfAKebab in September 2017 that focuses on preserving and recovering missing and lost versions of the game Minecraft. The website's goal is to document the history, proof of the existence, screenshots, and videos of lost versions while contributing that information to the Minecraft Wiki. As of 2022 they have collected and found more than 80 previously missing versions.

=== Findings ===
==== Minecraft Alpha 1.1.1 ====
In June 2021, Omniarchive found somebody who still had Alpha version 1.1.1 of the game. This version was only available for around 3 hours in September 2010, and was infamous for its "grey screen" bug. The version was discovered by a community member who contacted somebody who had it on an old USB flash drive.

==== Brickcraft ====
In June 2025, the Omniarchive team found and acquired a version of Brickcraft (codenamed "Project Rex Kwon Do"). This was an unreleased collaborative project by Mojang Studios and The Lego Group. The build dates back to 28 June 2012, around a month before the game's cancellation.
