= Turn-off notice =

Notice given to warn utility shutoffs

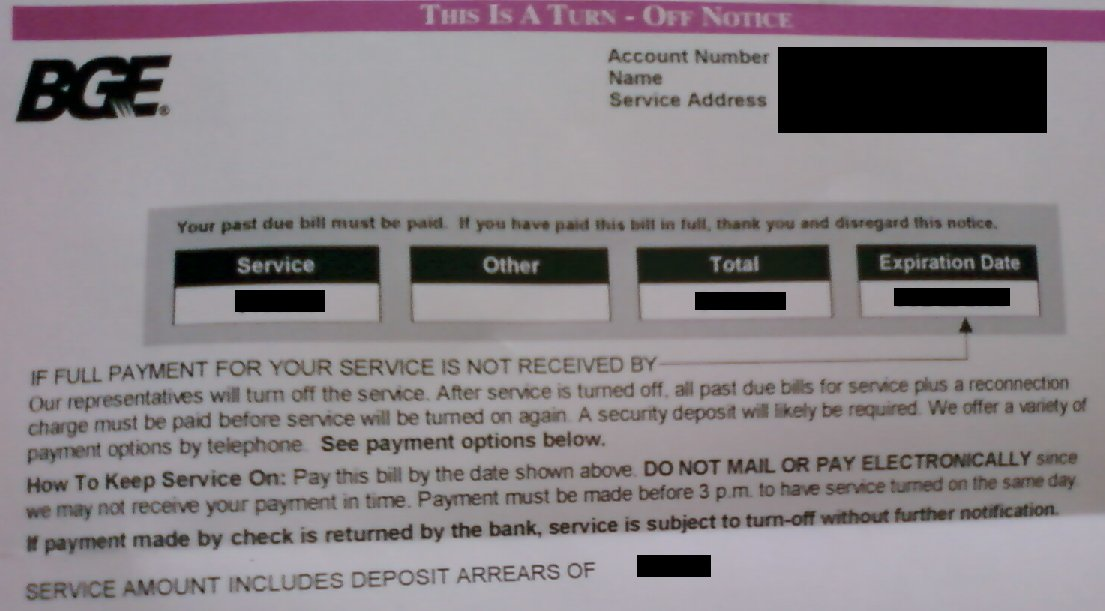
A turn-off notice issued by a utility service provider.

A turn-off notice, cut-off notice, or shut-off notice is a warning letter sent out by the provider of a service for a residence or other building, such as utility, phone service, or cable television, that if payment is not sent by the date indicated in the notice, the service will be interrupted. Turn-off notices, which are sent after a regular bill has been sent, but may resemble a bill, are generally sent several days to weeks before the planned date, giving the customer a sufficient amount of time to make a payment that would avert the interruption.

Turn-off notices are often sent to those who are economically struggling, thereby having difficulty paying their bills on time, the absent-minded who are able to afford their bills but are disorganized in making timely payments, and to those who are out of commission to pay bills due to personal unforeseen circumstances, such as illness.

In some cases, the turnoff notice may be necessary to obtain government or private aid in paying the bills.

Many turn-off notices encourage the customer to make a payment by some method other than the postal service to ensure that the payment is received before the cut-off date. Some methods of payment that are commonly accepted include check or credit card over the phone or online, or payment at the main office or a satellite location of the service provider, which may charge a fee for accepting the bill.

== Averting the turnoff ==
It is not uncommon for a customer who receives a turnoff notice to panic or to attempt to avoid the provider while silently dealing with the matter. But the general recommendation is to contact the service provider, which may be willing to grant an extension or otherwise work with the customer to keep payments up to date.

For certain types of utilities, such as heating, limited assistance may be available in some places to help customers pay their bills.

== Moratoriums and laws ==
Some local governments have placed temporary moratoriums on utility turnoffs under certain conditions, such as cold weather, the presence of a child, elderly, or sick person, or political controversies.

Some places have laws prohibiting or restricting certain turnoffs altogether. In the U.S. state of Idaho, the law prohibits utilities from turning off service in a residence where a child or dependent elderly person lives, though proof of this is required.

== See also ==
- Grace period
- Late fee
- Collection agency
- Eviction notice
