= Upgrade, Inc. =

American financial services company

- Type: Private
- Industry: Neobanking
- Founded: 2016
- Founder: Renaud Laplanche
- Headquarters: San Francisco, California, United States
- Areas served: United States
- Services: Mobile banking, Credit cards, Loans
- Number of employees: 1,950
- Website: https://www.upgrade.com/

Upgrade, Inc. is an American neobank founded in 2016. It has raised $750 million in equity funding and helped customers access over $50 billion in consumer credit since inception in 2017. The company is headquartered in San Francisco, California with an operations center in Phoenix, Arizona, a technology center in Montreal, Canada, and regional offices in Atlanta, Georgia and Irvine, California. The company does not maintain any physical branch banking locations. Upgrade offers a wide range of banking and credit products, including mobile banking, BNPL, credit cards, personal loans, home improvement financing and auto financing. The company's other services include credit monitoring and education tools.

== History ==
Upgrade was founded by Renaud Laplanche, founder and former CEO of LendingClub, and other former colleagues from LendingClub. The company raised a $60 million Series A funding round and began offering loans in April 2017.

In June 2020, Upgrade received a $1 billion valuation in a Series D equity round led by Santander Group, elevating the company to unicorn status. A year later, in August 2021, Upgrade raised $105 million in a Series E funding round led by Koch Disruptive Technologies, valuing the company at $3.3 billion.

In November 2021, CNBC reported that Upgrade grew 83% in valuation over four months to $6.28 billion after raising $280 million in a Series F funding round led by Coatue Management and DST Global.

In October 2025, CNBC and others reported that Upgrade had raised $165 million in new equity. Upgrade's Series G Preferred Round was led by Neuberger Berman, through its NB Alternatives Advisers LLC arm, with participation from LuminArx Capital Management and existing shareholders including DST Global and Ribbit Capital. The Series G funding brought the company valuation to $7.3 billion.

In 2019, Upgrade was awarded LendIt Fintech’s Emerging Lending Platform of the Year.

In 2021, Upgrade was featured on Deloitte’s Fast 500.

Upgrade was named to Forbes’ Fintech 50 in 2022. In the same year, the company was also recognized as one of the Best Places to Work in Fintech by American Banker and as one of America’s Best Startup Employers by Forbes. Upgrade has been named a Best Place to Work by BuiltIn.

In 2024 and 2025, CNBC recognized Upgrade as one of the World's Top 250 Fintech Companies. In March 2026, Upgrade was named one of USA Today’s Most Trusted Brands in the Banking and Financial Services category.

Upgrade Inc. filed applications in October 2026 to establish a Nevada-chartered bank to be called Upgrade Bank.

== Products ==
=== Upgrade Card ===
At the 2018 LendIt Conference in San Francisco, Upgrade announced a personal credit line for customers, a hybrid of a credit card and personal loan. In October 2019, the company launched Upgrade Card, which combines credit card acceptance with installment payments flexibility. Within two years of launch, the Nilson Report recognized Upgrade Card as the fastest-growing credit card in the US at the time.

=== Home Improvement ===
Upgrade began building their home improvement loan program in March of 2022. The company differentiated its home improvement financing model in multiple ways, including product features that allow contractors to pre-screen prospective customers in real time, partnering with over 2,000 contractors, and flexible financing options for customers.

By November 2022, Upgrade originated their first loan and, just a few months later in February 2023, they celebrated their first million in loan originations. In December 2024, Upgrade surpassed $1 billion in home improvement loan originations.

=== Auto Financing ===
A little over a year after launching its auto financing product, Upgrade announced it had reached a major milestone: partnering with more than 1,000 franchise and independent dealerships nationwide. This rapid growth highlighted the strong reception from dealers and their customers for flexible auto financing. In 2024, the company originated more than $500 million in auto loans in its first full year of indirect auto lending and, less than halfway through 2025, Upgrade announced it had surpassed $1 billion in auto loan originations.

=== Upgrade OneCard™ ===
Upgrade added the only-of-its-kind card to its credit product line with the launch of Upgrade OneCard™ in July 2022. Upgrade OneCard™ gives users a single card to meet all their payments needs: cardholders can use the “Pay Now” option for everyday expenses to make sure they stay within budget and avoid paying interest or fee charges, and use “Pay Later” to spread payments over time. This new card innovation offers the rewards of a credit card and helps consumers stay within budget like a debit card. Upgrade followed up by launching a secured version of its OneCard™ that supports individuals who struggle to get credit or underbanked individuals. Secured OneCard™ is ideal for the millions of consumers who have yet to build a credit history, which is vital in receiving loans or other credit products.

=== High-Yield Savings Account ===
Upgrade offers a high-yield savings account, Premier Savings. Premier Savings accounts offer a high annual percentage yield (APY) on balances of $1,000 or more, have no monthly or annual account maintenance fees, and are insured in FDIC and/or NCUA insurance through Cross River Bank or Participating Institutions.

=== Uplift Acquisition and Rebrand ===
Upgrade acquired travel-focused BNPL provider Uplift for $100 million in July 2023, expanding their strategy into travel as an additional vertical and another significant need of consumers. In December 2024, Upgrade announced the rebranding of Uplift to Flex Pay, opening a new chapter of growth, innovation, and expanded opportunities for customers and partners across the U.S. and Canada.

Expedia, one of the world’s leading travel technology companies, chose Flex Pay to bring flexible payment options to travelers booking cruise vacations in the U.S. and Canada. This offering became available in March 2025 across five Expedia Group brands, including Expedia Cruises, Expedia.com, Travelocity.com, Orbitz.com, and Cheaptickets.com. This partnership built upon the success of Upgrade’s cruise division, which achieved a 23% year-over-year growth in bookings in 2024, driven by both increased volume and order value.

=== Boost Money ===
Boost Money provides high-yield savings accounts and secured-credit cards to consumers.
