= Update =

Update(s) or updated may refer to:

== Music ==
- Update (Anouk album), 2004
- Update (Berlin Jazz Orchestra album), 2004
- Update (Jane Zhang album), 2007
- Update (Mal Waldron album), 1987
- Update (Yandel album), 2017
- Updated (M. Pokora album), an English-language version of Mise à jour, 2011

== Computing ==
- Software update, modifying installed software to be more up-to-date
- Update (SQL), a statement for changing database records

== Television ==
- DR Update, a defunct Danish television news channel
- Updates, a program broadcast by CNN Philippines

== See also ==
- Bayesian inference, a type of reasoning described as updating
- Patch (computing), a form of software update
- Upgrade, replacing or adding to improve
