= Minecraft legacy console editions =

Video game ports developed by 4J Studios

The British video game developer 4J Studios were responsible for developing Minecraft's legacy console editions.

From 2012 to 2017, the sandbox video game Minecraft was ported by 4J Studios to multiple seventh and eighth generation video game consoles. These ports have become retroactively known as "legacy console editions". These platforms include, in order of release: Xbox 360, PlayStation 3, PlayStation 4, Xbox One, PlayStation Vita, Wii U, and Nintendo Switch.

These console versions have multiple differences exclusive to them in comparison to other editions of the game. Unlike the virtually infinite worlds available on other platforms, worlds on the legacy console editions are significantly more limited in size. Exclusive content to these versions includes dedicated tutorial worlds, unique multiplayer modes (known as "minigames"), and downloadable content. The Xbox 360 Edition was the first time the full version of Minecraft was released physically.

Starting in 2017, the legacy console editions were gradually replaced by the game's Bedrock Edition on eighth generation consoles, with Xbox One Edition being the first to be replaced, followed shortly after by Nintendo Switch Edition. The Xbox 360, PlayStation 3, PlayStation Vita, and Wii U versions stopped receiving content updates in late 2018; Bedrock Edition was not released on those consoles. PlayStation 4 Edition received prolonged support due to issues with bringing Bedrock Edition to the platform, with Sony refusing to allow cross-platform play until 2019.

The final update that most of the ports received was equivalent to Java Edition version 1.13; Xbox One Edition and Nintendo Switch Edition only received 1.12, while PlayStation 4 got 1.14. Overall, the legacy console editions were received positively by video game journalists. Compared to Java edition, the early editions were criticized for their small world size and lack of features. In 2026, the full source code for earlier versions of the legacy console editions leaked online.

== Background ==
Minecraft is a sandbox video game developed and published by Mojang Studios, released in 2011. In the game, players explore a procedurally generated world made up of voxels (cubes). Players are able to harvest materials, craft tools and items, build structures, and fight hostile mobs. Since the game's original development phase starting in 2009, the game has been released on a variety of platforms, including several video game consoles.

== Overview ==
"Legacy Console Edition" included exclusive levels compared to the PC version. From top to bottom: a dedicated tutorial world, first introduced in the Xbox 360 Edition. A Super Mario-themed world exclusive to the Wii U Edition and Nintendo Switch Edition.

"Legacy console editions" is a retroactive label given to the versions of Minecraft that were published on video game consoles prior to the release of the game's Bedrock Edition in 2017. These platforms include, in order of release: Xbox 360, PlayStation 3, PlayStation 4, Xbox One, PlayStation Vita, Wii U, and Nintendo Switch. These versions were developed by 4J Studios, and featured multiple differences from the main PC editions. The Java source code for Java Edition was rewritten in C++, with further modifications to ensure optimal performance. Due to saved game size limits on platforms with legacy console editions, world sizes were capped out at a limited number of blocks in comparison to other editions, where world sizes are virtually infinite. Dedicated tutorial worlds were added to assist newer players with learning the game's mechanics and newest updates. The crafting system was simplified for the legacy console editions; instead of placing items on a grid to craft items, the player selects items to craft from a menu of different recipes. Most versions include support for split-screen local multiplayer, with Xbox 360 Edition having a drop-in four-player split-screen.

Also included in these versions were unique multiplayer game modes, referred to as "minigames". These were "Battle", a hunger games styled deathmatch mode where several players have to fight to be the last one standing; "Tumble", which requires player to destroy a floating platform to knock other players off and also be the last one standing, and "Glide", a flying racing mode. Legacy console editions also featured a variety of exclusive texture and skin packs. Among these were ones based on other video game franchises, such as one based on Super Mario that was exclusive to Nintendo platforms. Updates for the legacy console editions were generally delivered after their PC and mobile counterparts. For example, features from Minecraft's 1.9 "End Update", which officially released in February 2016, were not added to console editions until December.

== History ==
Development information of legacy console editions
Edition/console	First released	Discontinued	Final update equivalent (Note: Based on what the final update each platform received was equivalent to on the game's original Java Edition)
Xbox 360	May 9, 2012	2018	1.13
PlayStation 3	December 17, 2013	2018	1.13
PlayStation 4	September 4, 2014	2019	1.14
Xbox One	September 5, 2014	2017	1.12
PlayStation Vita	October 15, 2014	2018	1.13
Wii U	December 17, 2015	2018	1.13
Nintendo Switch	May 11, 2017	2018	1.12

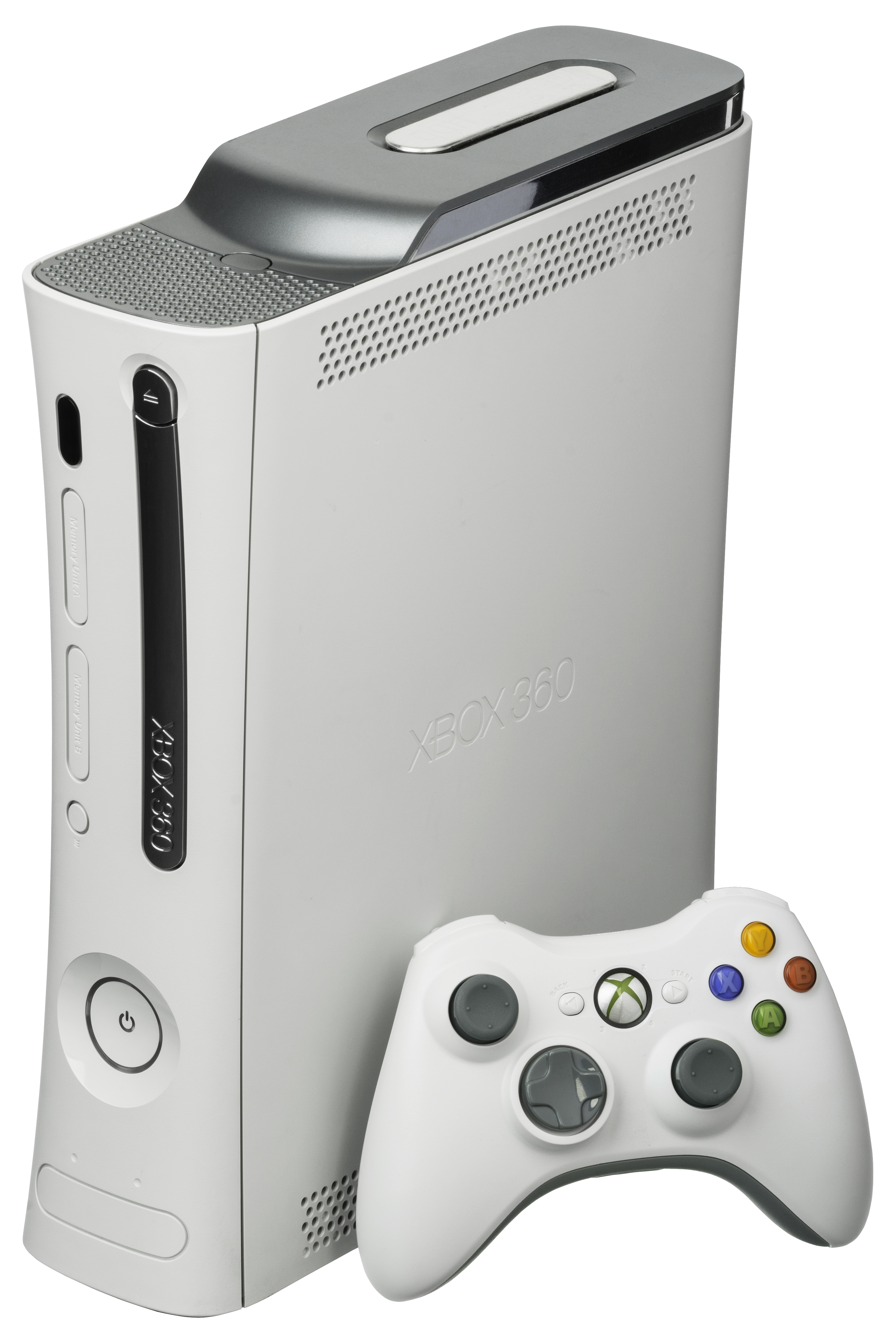
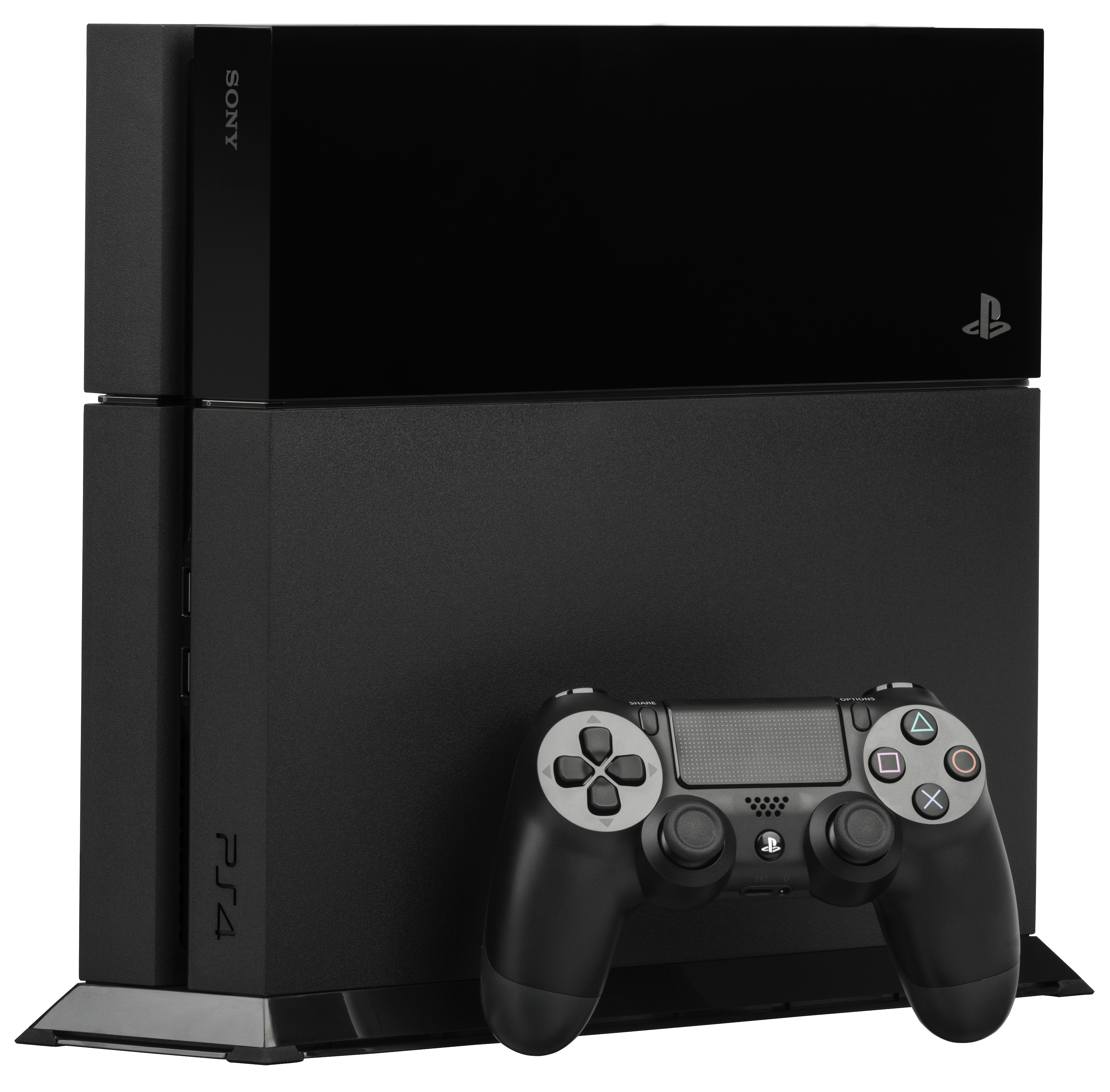
The Xbox 360 (left) was the first console to get "Legacy Console Edition", with the PlayStation 4 being the last to be discontinued.

Mojang, the company which created Minecraft, worked with Markus Persson, Microsoft, and port specialist 4J Studios to build a version of Minecraft that was "slightly less advanced" for home consoles. In June 2011, it was announced at E3 that Minecraft would be released on to the Xbox 360. In March 2012, the first console edition was revealed at PAX East for the Xbox 360, as part of the Xbox Live Arcade NEXT promotion. The Xbox 360 Edition was released on May 9, 2012, on the Xbox Live Arcade. On the first day of the game's release, it sold over 400,000 copies; by the fifth day, it hit a million copies sold.

All legacy console editions were developed in C++. In May 2012, senior technology officer Paddy Burns of 4J Studios did an interview with Digital Foundry to discuss the development of the Xbox 360 Edition. Burns said that the main priority was to match all the features available on PC, and that the legacy console editions were created on a strong technical foundation and had considerable scope for improvement. Burns said that the visuals and gameplay are "essentially identical" to the original, with the procedural world generation, lighting and physics engine being "all entirely intact." However, the Xbox 360 had restrictions on world sizes, meaning that worlds generated was limited to 864x864 blocks. Burns said this was "one of the big focuses of improvement for future updates." The developers wanted to address the criticism that the game was outdated compared with the PC version by updating it. On the topic of mods, skins, and texture packs, Burns said that downloadable skin and texture packs were in development, however mod support was "a difficult thing to provide on a console".

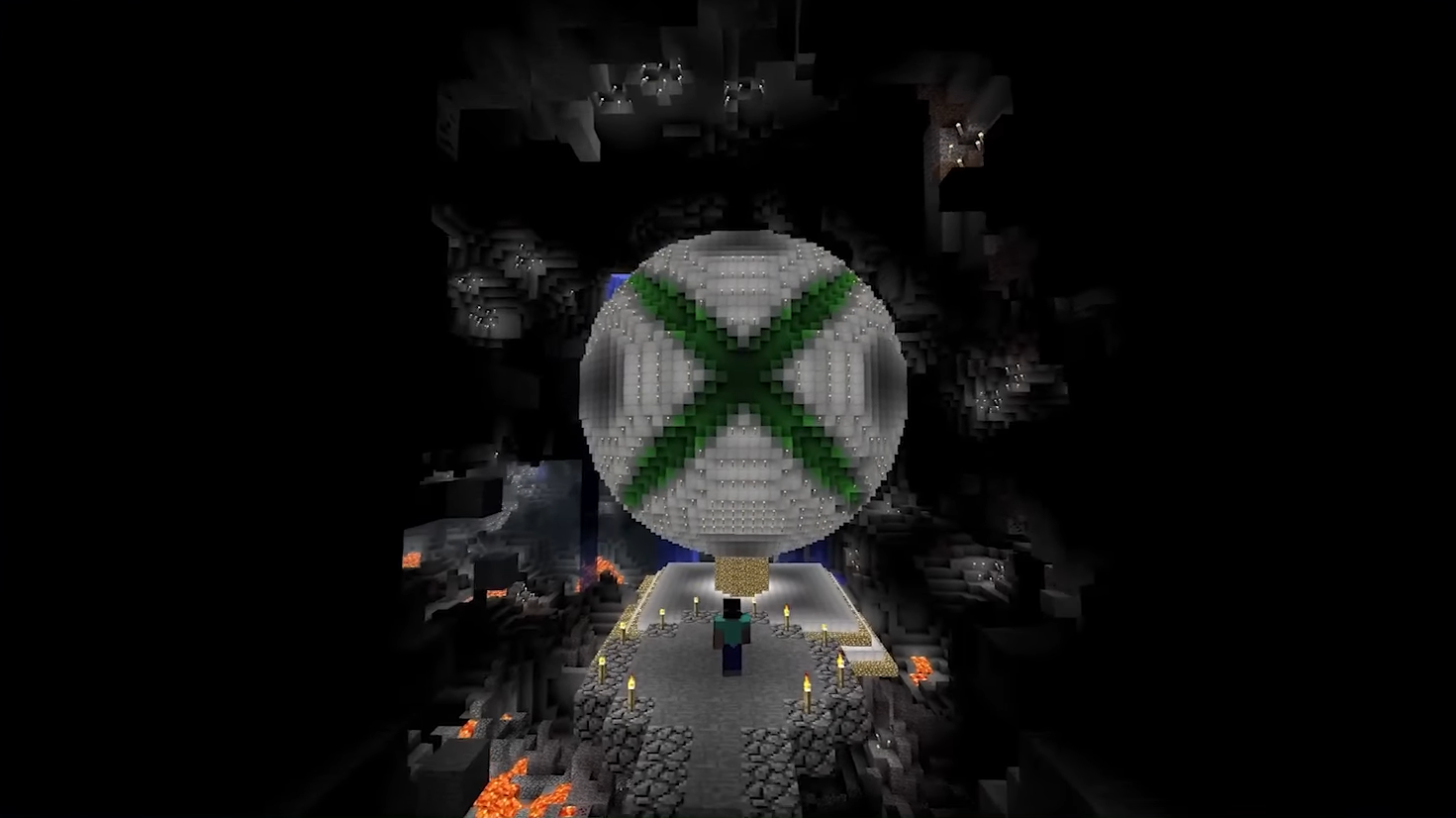
Screenshot from the trailer "Minecraft coming to Xbox 360" (2011)

On June 28, 2012, Xbox 360 Edition was released physically. It was the first time Minecraft was released physically, aside from a demo disc included in a 2011 issue of PC Gamer By October, the Xbox 360 Edition had sold 4 million copies. On October 16, 4J Studios added Creative Mode, the hunger mechanics from the PC version, and new enemies and items. In December, 4J Studios announced information about Title Update 7, (Note: Title Update (TU) is standard nomenclature for patching games on the Xbox 360. Despite this, the term TU was also used for other console versions.) which added animal breeding, baby animals, the Nether Fortress, and Villagers. The studio also confirmed that "The End" sequence from the PC version would be added in Title Update 8. In January 2013, Mojang revealed that Xbox 360 Edition had outsold Java Edition (PC version) in 2012, with 5 million copies being sold that year compared to Java's 4.1 million copies. On May 11, 2013, TU11 was released, which included some bug fixes, and updated the spawn limit for shearing or breeding, paintings, and item frames.

In November 2013, 4J Studios announced a PlayStation 3 version was in development. 4J Studios said that it was "prioritising work" on the PlayStation 3 version before launching on any other platform such as the then next-gen consoles, PlayStation 4, PlayStation Vita and Xbox One. Updates for the Xbox 360 Edition were put on hold until the PlayStation 3 Edition launched. PlayStation 3 Edition was released on December 17, 2013. In March 2014, TU14 was released. It added new items including emeralds and had more general improvements. On April 25, Mojang confirmed that PlayStation 3 worlds would transfer to PlayStation 4 and Vita. Then-CEO of Microsoft Gaming Phil Spencer also confirmed that game saves from the Xbox 360 would be transferrable to the Xbox One version.

By April 4, 2014, the Xbox 360 Edition passed 12 million copies sold. On April 16, Mojang announced that the PlayStation 3 Edition would be getting a physical release on May 14. Along with this, they revealed the PlayStation 3, 4, and Vita boxes, with different box art compared to the Xbox 360. According to GameSpot, the physical version of the Xbox 360 was at the high end of the UK charts since its launch. The PlayStation 3 Edition had sold around 1.5 million copies. In June 2014, Mojang's Patrick Geuder said that Minecraft had sold almost 54 million copies across all platforms. The PlayStation 4 Edition was released on September 4, 2014. Originally planned as a PS4 launch title, it was delayed before its eventual release.

The Xbox One Edition launched on September 5, 2014, featuring worlds that were 36 times larger than the Xbox 360 Edition and support for 8 player online multiplayer via Xbox Live. On September 15, 2014, Microsoft bought Mojang for $2.5 billion. Later that September, Sony announced that PlayStation 4 Edition would release in disc form on October 3, 2014. On October 9, 4J Studios announced that the PlayStation Vita Edition would release on the 15th. On May 7, 2015, to celebrate the three year anniversary of the legacy console editions, Mojang added free skins of the developers for the Xbox 360 and Xbox One editions. They were available to download until the 17th of May.

On June 30, 2015, TU25 was released, which added the "Superflat" world type, stained glass, and new game options. On July 1, two new DLC packs were released, including a Minecon 2015 skin pack and a LittleBigPlanet mash-up pack, with the latter being a PlayStation exclusive. In December, TU31 was released. Described by Game Informer as the "biggest console update yet", the update added several new mobs, blocks and biomes. Minecraft: Wii U Edition was released on December 17, 2015, with a physical release in North America on June 17, 2016, and in Europe on June 30. On October 4, 2016, TU43 added polar bears, banners, and beetroots. TU46 was released In December 2016, adding the Elytra, End Cities, and amplified terrain. The Nintendo Switch version launched via the eShop on May 11, 2017.

=== Discontinuation ===
Avatar of 4J Studios

4J Studios
(@4JStudios)
tweeted:

The final update for Minecraft Console Editions on PlayStation 3, PlayStation Vita and Wii U will be out today/tomorrow, adding The Nightmare Before Christmas Mash-up Pack. Thank you to all the players on these editions for your support over the years :)

Dec 18, 2018

On June 11, 2017, Microsoft announced that, starting in August, the Better Together update for the game's Bedrock Edition would replace existing versions of the game across nearly every platform, including the Pocket Edition for mobile devices and the legacy console editions. The Xbox One Edition was the first to be replaced, followed shortly after by the Nintendo Switch Edition. The Xbox 360, PlayStation 3, PlayStation Vita, and Wii U versions stopped receiving content updates in late 2018; Bedrock Edition was not released on those consoles. The last major update for those versions was the Aquatic Update.

In May 2018, Microsoft announced they would be ending support for older console versions due to their low user base. In a blog post, a Microsoft spokesperson said "Although we'd love to keep bringing new content to all our players forever, the older generation of consoles now make up less than five per cent of our active players." On December 18, 2018, 4J Studios announced in a tweet that the final content update would add a The Nightmare Before Christmas mash-up pack, while also thanking players for their support over the years.

The PlayStation 4 Edition received prolonged support due to issues with bringing Bedrock Edition to the platform, with Sony refusing to allow cross-platform play until 2019. While the legacy console editions were removed from digital stores, existing owners may continue to play them, and they remain obtainable through physical copies on most platforms. Players that own an old platform-specific edition are able to download Bedrock Edition for free. Not all additional content from old save files can be transferred to Bedrock Edition. In September 2024, 4J Studios announced they would making Reforj, a spiritual successor to the legacy console editions. British YouTuber Joseph Garrett, known online as Stampy and who had primarily made his Minecraft videos on the Xbox 360 Edition, is involved in its development as a game designer.

=== Source code leak ===
In February 2026, the full source code for earlier versions of the legacy console editions leaked on 4chan. Alongside the full code and builds for the Xbox 360 and PlayStation 3 versions, it included multiple features that were never released in public versions of Minecraft, references to a Windows build of legacy console, and leftover code from Java Edition. A PC port was created, featuring functional multiplayer. Various users started developing mods for the leaked build, focused mainly on backporting features from modern versions of Minecraft. On 10 March 2026, a fork of the leaked version appeared on Steam under the title Kogama, with a planned release date of March 17. The social media accounts connected to the page were promptly blocked by Microsoft.

== Reception ==
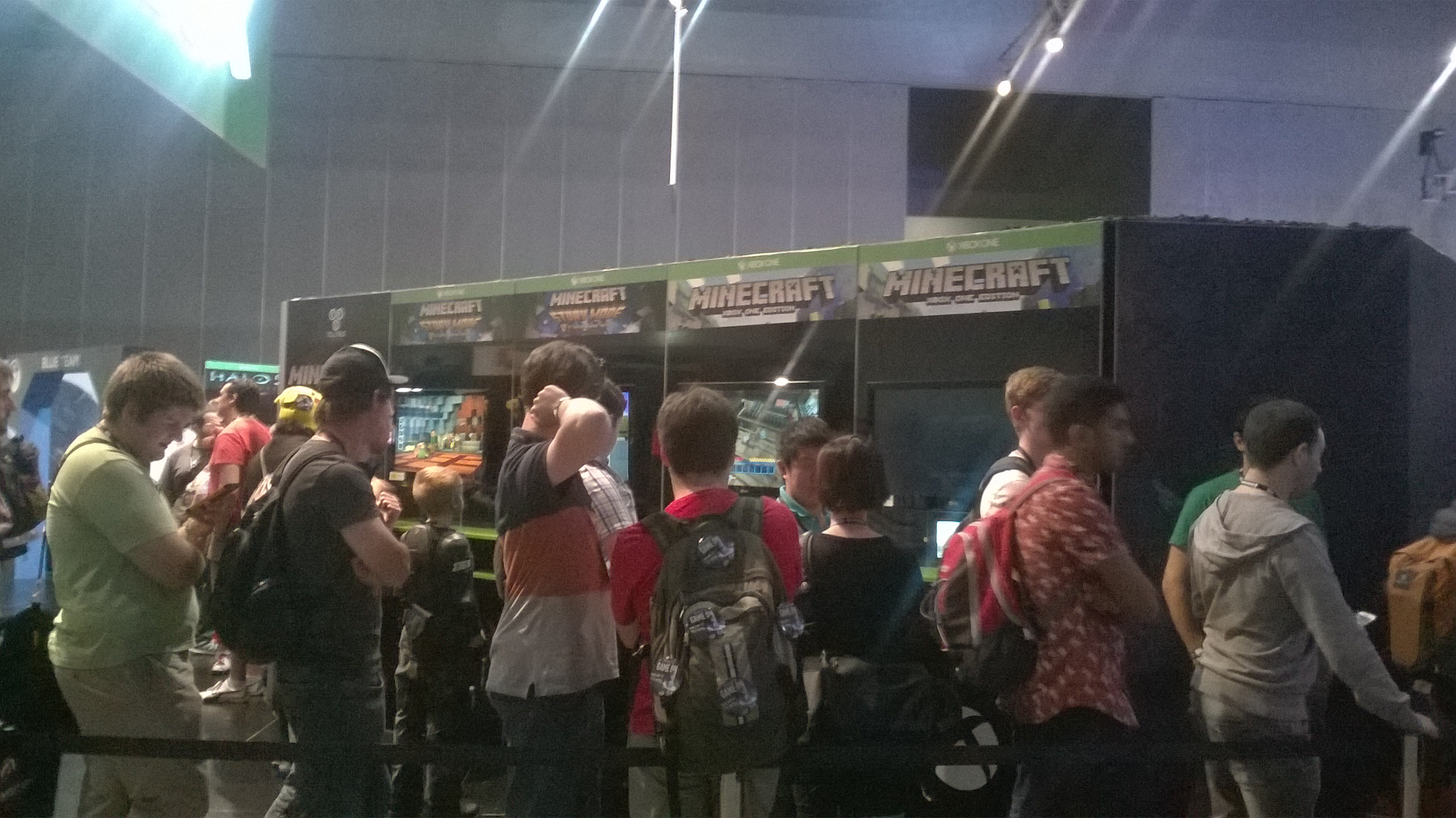
People playing Xbox One Edition and Minecraft: Story Mode at PAX Australia 2015. Critics said that "Legacy Console Edition" was good for newcomers to the game.

Overall, the legacy console editions were received positively by video game journalists. Compared to Java Edition, the early editions were criticized for their small world size and the lack of features from Java. (Note: Attributed to multiple references:)

Critics praised the controls on console. Oli Welsh of Eurogamer said the controls are "taut, fast and logical" and praised the simplified crafting, writing that "It's very handy and eliminates what would have been a cumbersome interface for the Xbox controller, but an important aspect of the game has undeniably been streamlined away here." IGN's Anthony Gallegos of IGN added that 4J Studios "smartly recreated the crafting system," while being faithful to the PC version.

Critics said that the version was good for newcomers to the game, but that players who were used to the PC version might miss certain features. Welsh called the Xbox 360 Edition "a supremely tight version of a classic game that gracefully navigates the limitations of its platform." While noting that "purists might find this version a little dumbed down," he found that the console version was better for newcomers. Gallegos said that "I don't think most newcomers will care about any of these "missing" features, especially since the core mechanics and crafting recipes are present and more than enough to inspire countless hours of play." Both Welsh and Nathan Meunier of GameSpot praised the tutorial world.

The small world size was a frequent point of criticism. Meunier said what was "equally disappointing is that maps are no longer infinite." Game Informer's Cork said while "It's true that the worlds in Minecraft 360 Edition are smaller than on PC (only about 1,000 blocks versus nearly infinite width), but I never ran into the invisible walls unless I was setting out to do so." Despite the shortcomings, Cork said it "more than delivers in most other ways." GameSpot's Cameron Woolsey said the same about the limited world size on the PlayStation 3 Edition. Brian Albert of IGN said the world size was the biggest limitation of the version, same with the PlayStation Vita version. Albert was more critical of the PlayStation Vita Edition due to its low performance. Sammy Barker of Push Square said that the PlayStation Vita Edition was a "uncompromising edition of a modern classic," despite the few minor interface issues, framerate fluctuations, and technical limitations.

The lack of features from the Java version of the game was criticized. Keith Stuart of The Guardian found the Xbox 360 Edition to be "more limited than the current PC iteration", but also noted that it was "a sort of work-in-progress" and that 4J Studios did "a great job of eliminating the bugs and glitches of earlier PC instalments." Overall, Stuart recommended the edition as "an essential purchase, but one that needs to grow from these solid foundations." In contrast, Gallegos said "Minecraft on Xbox is almost as good as the PC version." Welsh said it is a "purer version of the game".

The Xbox One Edition and the PlayStation 4 Edition were well-received and considered as the best ports, with particular praise for their larger world sizes. Albert of IGN and Thea Severance of Play Station Universe commended the editions for having 36 times larger worlds than the PlayStation 3 edition. The PlayStation 4 Edition is retroactively considered the best "Legacy Console Edition." Alessandra Minuz of IGN Italy praised the Wii U Edition but noted the lack of GamePad integration. Mitch Vogel of Nintendo Life said "Mojang has done a wonderful job of porting the full Minecraft experience over to the Wii U". Oliver Brandt of Vooks praised the Nintendo Switch Edition for being "more similar to the PC version of Minecraft" and for its relatively larger worlds. IGN's Alanah Pearce said Nintendo Switch Edition was a "authentic Minecraft experience".

In a 2017 interview, British YouTuber Joseph Garrett, known online as Stampy, said he had "mixed feelings" about Mojang's discontinuation of the legacy console editions in favor of Bedrock Edition. Garrett stated that he "always loved the idea of there being one version of Minecraft that is the same on every platform", but was highly critical of Bedrock Edition compared to the original console version. In 2025, Christopher Cruz of Rolling Stone listed the Xbox 360 Edition as the ninth "best Xbox 360 games of all time". Cruz credits Minecraft's arrival on Xbox 360 with significantly expanding the game's popularity in 2012, writing that "Minecraft: Xbox 360 Edition was an essential part of the franchise's rise, and for a generation of console gamers was a formative experience."
