= Star Trek: Conquest =

2007 video game

- Developer: 4J Studios
- Publisher: Bethesda Softworks
- Director: Frank Arnot
- Designer: Kevin Finnigan
- Composer: Jason Graves
- Platforms: Wii, PlayStation 2
- Release: USA: November 20, 2007; CAN: November 27, 2007; EU: March 14, 2008
- Genre: Strategy
- Mode: Single-player

Star Trek: Conquest is a video game set in the Star Trek universe. The game features both turn-based strategy and real time strategy gameplay. It was developed by Scottish studio 4J Studios, which previously developed Star Trek: Encounters, and was published by Bethesda Softworks for the PlayStation 2 and Wii, becoming the third game available on a Nintendo console to be published by Bethesda and first since the NES version of Home Alone in 1991.

The game is set in the Star Trek: The Next Generation era, with players able to choose six groups and races: Federation, Klingon, Romulan, Breen, Cardassian and Dominion. These races are the main combatants of the Dominion War featured in Deep Space Nine.

== Plot ==
Stardate 41153.2: It is a time of conflict; all major races are at war. Diplomacy is dead, age-old alliances forgotten and galactic borders ignored as each race battle for supremacy. Powerful fleets prowl the galaxy, establishing outposts, vanquishing indigenous and enemy fleets alike, in the pursuit of the ultimate prize : the capture of all homeworlds and galactic domination.

== Gameplay ==
=== Campaign ===
Star Trek: Conquest is played in turns. Each turn allows the player to purchase facilities or ships, construct Special Weapons or commission an Admiral. Fleets can move between friendly and attack enemy systems as well, but if players engage in combat, they must resolve it immediately.

The goal is to conquer the galaxy by eliminating all enemies by taking their Home World.

If players lose their homeworld, they will no longer be able to commission Admirals or construct Special Weapons.

=== Skirmish ===
Skirmish mode allows players to set up battles without playing the campaign. Victory is achieved by destroying all of the opponent's ships. Some options will be unavailable until unlocked through the Campaign-mode.

=== Admirals ===
Players begin Campaign mode with one free Admiral. Each Admiral comes with a Cruiser and can have up to seven ships. Admirals are commissioned/purchased at the player's homeworld, and come in various types which offer bonuses to players depending on their type: Attack, Defense, or Movement.

==== Experience and Ranks ====
Each battle gains experience. Once enough experience is gained, the Admiral will rise in promotion and earn improved abilities. Each Admiral starts at rank one and can move up to rank five. However, if he or she is defeated, all experience will be lost.

== Development ==
The game was announced in August 2007.

== Reception ==
Reception

Aggregate score
Aggregator	Score	
Aggregator	PS2	Wii
Metacritic	54/100	49/100

Review scores
Publication	Score	
Publication	PS2	Wii
1Up.com	C	C
Eurogamer	N/A	3/10
Game Informer	5/10	5/10
GamePro	N/A	1/5
GameRevolution	C	N/A
GameSpy	1/5	1/5
IGN	8/10	6.8/10
NGamer	N/A	64%
Nintendo World Report	N/A	8/10
PlayStation: The Official Magazine	4/5	N/A
Digital Spy	3/5	N/A

The PlayStation 2 version received "mixed" reviews, while the Wii version received "generally unfavorable reviews", according to the review aggregation website Metacritic.

Initial reviews were favorable with IGN describing the Wii version as "an interesting game to say the least", but noting that the Wii price tag means that "only hardcore Trekkies and hardcore strategy fans need apply". However, the out-of-character action of Starfleet "punches gatling-phaser holes in purist Trekdom all over the place" and is seen as "an offensively bad use of a cherished license".
