= Ducati Moto =

2008 video game

- PAL cover art
- Developer: 4J Studios (Note: Ported to N-Gage by Eclipse Interactive)
- Publisher: Vir2L
- Platforms: Nintendo DS, N-Gage 2.0
- Release: Nintendo DS: NA: July 1, 2008; EU: August 22, 2008; N-Gage 2.0; September 14, 2009
- Genre: Racing
- Modes: Single-player, multiplayer

Ducati Moto is a motorbike racing game developed by 4J Studios and published by ZeniMax Media subsidiary Vir2L.

== Gameplay ==
Ducati Moto is an arcade-style motorcycle racing game, centering its gameplay around agility, speed, using the Ducati brand. Players select from 11 different Ducati models—like the Monster and Desmosedici RR—and race across five distinct modes, including Time Attack, Eliminator, and Stunt Challenge. Set in global locales such as Hong Kong, Italy, and Morocco, each race brings its own backdrop and driving conditions. Riders can perform power slides, jumps, and wheelies, emphasizing a fast-paced, stylized approach over strict realism. The game supports both solo play and competitive multiplayer through local wireless and Nintendo Wi-Fi, with eight characters providing variety in their racing leathers.

== Development ==
The game was announced in April 2008 by Vir2L studios, subsidiary of parent company ZeniMax Media. The Nintendo DS version was developed in association with 4J Studios, releasing in North America on July 1, 2008, and in Europe one month later on August 22. A port for N-Gage 2.0 was developed by Eclipse Interactive and released on September 14, 2009.

== Reception ==
Reception

Aggregate score
Aggregator	Score
Metacritic	69/100

Review scores
Publication	Score
IGN	6/10
Pocket Gamer	3/5

Ducati Moto received "mixed or average" reviews, according to review aggregator platform Metacritic. IGN rated the game a 6 out of 10, stating, "Ducati Moto is not a bad game, it's just not a very good game. It's a very easy motorcycle racer that suffers from a lackluster presentation."
