= Manic Mechanics =

2023 video game

- Developer: 4J Studios
- Publisher: Curve Games (Note: Manic Mechanics was initially published by 4J Studios until they formed a partnership with Curve Games to take over publishing rights of the title in October 2024.)
- Engine: Unreal Engine
- Platforms: Nintendo Switch; PlayStation 4; PlayStation 5; Windows; Xbox One; Xbox Series X/S
- Release: Nintendo Switch; 13 July 2023; PlayStation 4, PlayStation 5, Windows, Xbox One, Xbox Series X/S; 7 March 2024
- Genre: Party
- Modes: Single-player, multiplayer

Manic Mechanics is a 2023 party video game developed by 4J Studios and published by Curve Games. It was released on 13 July 2023 for Nintendo Switch, and on 7 March 2024 for PlayStation 4, PlayStation 5, Windows, Xbox One and Xbox Series X/S.

== Gameplay ==
Manic Mechanics is a party game which can be played with up to four players in local or online co-operative gameplay. There are a series of missions, and the aim is for players to complete the unfinished cars coming through the production line. Players must grab the missing parts from a nearby conveyor belt and apply them to the car accordingly so it can be replaced by the next incomplete car. As the player progresses, the difficulty increases, with new parts added and combination parts introduced. Several levels have added risks, such as lava, alien invasions and the potential to be electrified.

== Development and release ==
At Nintendo Direct in June 2023, Manic Mechanics was revealed by 4J Studios and was scheduled to launch on 13 July 2023 for Nintendo Switch. On 17 January 2024, it was announced that versions would release on 7 March 2024 for PlayStation 4, PlayStation 5, Windows, Xbox One and Xbox Series X/S.

== Reception ==
Reception

Aggregate score
Aggregator	Score
Metacritic	(NS) 71/100 (PS4) 66/100

Review scores
Publication	Score
TechRadar	4/5
IGN France	8/10
Pocket Tactics	7/10
PlayStation Universe	7/10

Manic Mechanics received "mixed or average" reviews from critics on Nintendo Switch and PlayStation 4, according to review aggregator site Metacritic.

TechRadar rated the game 4/5, and wrote: "The couch co-op’s simple premise is equally exhilarating and frustrating, resulting in a game you just can’t put down." IGN France, who rated it 8/10, praised the gameplay loop and described the level of polish as "outstanding". Pocket Tactics rated the game 7/10, and wrote: "With stellar multiplayer gameplay and an intelligently crafted difficulty curve, Manic Mechanics offers hours of engaging content to race through." PlayStation Universe also rated the game 7/10, but was critical of the limited content.
