= Far Lands =

Minecraft glitch

- Minecraft location
- The "Far Lands" as it appears in Beta 1.7.3 of Minecraft: Java Edition
- First appearance: Early versions of Minecraft (2011)
- Created by: Mojang

In-universe information
- Type: World generation error

The "Far Lands" (also spelled Farlands) is a terrain generation bug present in early versions of the sandbox video game Minecraft (2011), appearing as a wall of corrupted terrain indicating the edge of the game's world. The glitch is caused by floating point errors in the code, which accumulate the further the player travels out from the center of a Minecraft world and ultimately results in glitched terrain and errors in the game's physics. The Far Lands only exist in early development versions of the game's Java Edition and were patched out before the official release; the last version with the Far Lands is Beta 1.7.3.

While the Far Lands only existed within early versions of Minecraft, the glitch became popular within the game's fandom. Multiple players embarked on journeys to travel to the Far Lands by walking, including YouTuber Kurt J. Mac and his let's play series Far Lands or Bust that ran from 2011 to 2025, and KilloCrazyMan, who in 2020 became the first user recorded to have reached the Far Lands. The Far Lands were later featured in the 2015 episodic video game Minecraft: Story Mode and referenced in the 2018 crossover fighting video game Super Smash Bros. Ultimate.

== Overview ==
Minecraft is a sandbox video game where players explore procedurally generated worlds made up of voxels (cubes). These worlds are intended to be virtually infinite, although technical limitations prevent this; terrain and the Far Lands can continue up till the 32-bit integer limit at a distance of 2,147,483,647 blocks from spawn before the game crashes. Current versions of the game feature a world barrier that prevents the player's advancement past 30 million blocks from the center of the world.

Earlier versions of the game, however, had no such hard barrier, and the game would begin glitching the further out the player went. Ultimately, this culminated in the "Far Lands", a fissured wall of corrupted terrain that generates after traveling 12,550,821 blocks away from the world's center, and indicates its edge. The wall of terrain is caused by floating point errors in the game's code, which accumulate the further the player gets out from spawn and ultimately result in the glitched wall. Other effects from traveling long distances in the world included errors in the game's entity pathfinding, physics, and player movement.

Minecraft creator Markus "Notch" Persson noted the existence of the Far Lands and other glitches since first adding infinite worlds to the game. In a blog post in March 2011, and later in an interview with The New Yorker, he said that he knew Minecraft terrain generation would start breaking down the further the player traveled. However, he did not find fixing these errors to be an urgent issue, thinking that players would likely never travel far enough in regular gameplay for it to be a significant problem. He also thought that the terrain generation and other long-distance errors would add more "mystery and charisma" to the Far Lands, which he penned the name of to refer to these errors. The glitch is also present in early versions of the game's Bedrock Edition.

The Far Lands and its related errors were patched out of the game by its official release; the last version of the game with the Far Lands is Beta 1.7.3. In September 2026, a debug option was added to Java Edition that re-enables the generation of the Far Lands, although it generates differently than in beta versions of the game and generation errors begin at 2.8 million blocks out instead of 12 and a half million.

== Legacy ==
Despite only existing in early versions of the game before its official release, the Far Lands gained notoriety within the game's community. The Far Lands is featured in the fourth episode of the episodic video game Minecraft: Story Mode, and is the namesake for Steve's "Classic Mode" route in the 2018 fighting video game Super Smash Bros. Ultimate.

In 2011, YouTuber Kurt J. Mac started a Minecraft "Let's Play" series titled Far Lands or Bust, aiming to walk from the center of the world to the Far Lands. The series began on March 28, 2011, and concluded on October 4, 2025. The series raised hundreds of thousands of dollars for multiple charity organizations, including Child's Play, Direct Relief, and the Equal Justice Initiative. Guinness World Records recognized "Far Lands or Bust" as the world record for the longest recorded journey in Minecraft. Multiple other players also embarked on their own journeys to reach the Far Lands, many of whom completed their journeys before Mac did; the first recorded player to walk to the Far Lands was "KilloCrazyMan", who walked from the world center to the Far Lands in nine months and completed his journey in June 2020.

In 2026, the Far Lands became the namesake for the "TikTok Far Lands", a category of TikTok videos considered too obscure or horrifying to be recommended to users under normal circumstances. Jessica Maddox, a professor at the University of Georgia, compared the Minecraft Far Lands to the video category, arguing that the former represented a point in the game where players could not travel any further, while the latter represented an "end of the internet where things get weird".

== See also ==
- Kill screen
