= Reforj =

- Developer: 4J Studios
- Publisher: 4J Studios
- Producer: Chris van der Kuyl
- Designer: Joseph Garrett
- Engine: Elements Engine
- Platforms: Windows; Xbox; PlayStation
- Genres: Casual, Sandbox, Survival, Adventure
- Modes: Single-player, Multiplayer

Reforj is an upcoming open-world survival sandbox game being developed by 4J Studios. The game is built on 4J Studios' Elements Engine and is scheduled for release on Microsoft Windows, Xbox and PlayStation.

== Gameplay ==
Reforj is a 3D open-world sandbox game where players control an unnamed protagonist with the goal of surviving. The game also features a creative mode which allows players to build and explore without taking damage or resources limitations.

Reforj draws inspiration from Minecraft, a game whose console versions were previously developed by 4J Studios. Reforj distinguishes itself using its 'sculpting' mechanic that provides increased flexibility when building by offering a broader range of shapes and angles for the player to manipulate the world with. Reforj is slated to be released for PC as well as the modern consoles (PlayStation 5 and Xbox Series X and Series S).

=== Future plans ===
Reforj aims to involve exploring procedurally generated voxel worlds while combating enemy mobs and navigating through diverse environments with an option to traverse gateways, offering additional exploration opportunities. Reforj will in future add an option to play on a "flat world": a world with no terrain providing players a blank canvas for unrestricted building.

== Development ==
Reforj is built on the Elements Engine, a proprietary game engine developed by 4J Studios, allowing for enhanced world generation, faster loading times, stable framerate, and advanced physics simulations. Joseph Garrett, better known by his online alias Stampy, is involved in its development as a game designer.

4J Studios were the developers of the Minecraft console editions from 2012 to 2019. Due to Microsoft restructuring, CEO Paddy Burns "saw the writing on the wall" for being able to have the company focused on Minecraft royalties, and so the team decided they needed to work on their own projects to remain successful as a company. In 2019, Burns posed a question to the 4J engineering team on what they would do if they had a chance to make their own voxel game engine. The rules Burns set for the new engine were that it had to run at 60 FPS no matter what, and would be console-first. This would later become the Elements engine. By 2023–24, the engine was in such a state that 4J could begin working on a fleshed out game.

Reforj was made available for early testers on Xbox Series X/S on 30 April 2025 with its "Pioneer program", which gives hundreds of players access during its early development. The game received its first content update in May, which transformed building tools. Further updates have been released on a monthly or quarterly basis since then. A PC playtest is set to release in closed alpha in Q1 2027.
