= Breeders' Cup World Thoroughbred Championships (video game) =

2005 video game

- Developer: 4J Studios
- Publisher: Bethesda Softworks
- Platforms: Xbox, PlayStation 2
- Release: September 21, 2005
- Genre: Horse racing
- Modes: Single-player, multiplayer

Breeders' Cup World Thoroughbred Championships is a 2005 video game developed by 4J Studios and published by Bethesda Softworks. The game was licensed by the National Thoroughbred Racing Association and Breeders' Cup Limited.

== Gameplay ==
Breeders' Cup World Thoroughbred Championships is a horse racing game with several gameplay modes. Players can participate in Quick Race, which is a single race. A Day at the Races allows players to bet on consecutive races at a track, offering various gambling options, but winnings can only be used for more bets. Challenge a Champion lets players race against famous horses on different tracks, but this mode is unlocked through Career Mode, which is the game's most extensive feature. In Career Mode, players can breed, train, and race horses, enter events, and place bets. Recorded commentary is included from Breeders' Cup announcer Tom Durkin, with voice clips replaying frequently.

== Development ==
The game was announced in April 2005.

== Reception ==
Reception

Review scores
Publication	Score
GameSpot	4.6/10
IGN	4.3/10
TeamXbox	4.8/10(Xbox)

The Xbox version of the game holds a rating of 47% on Metacritic based on 5 critic reviews.

IGN rated the game a 4.3 of 10 stating "Unless you're an absolutely massive horse racing fan or an obsessive collector of video games, there's really no reason to pick this title up".
