= 4J Studios =

British video game developer

4J Studios Limited
- Type: Private
- Industry: Video games
- Predecessor: VIS Entertainment
- Founded: 19 April 2005; 21 years ago
- Founders: Chris van der Kuyl; Paddy Burns; Frank Arnot
- Headquarters: Dundee, Scotland
- Key people: Chris van der Kuyl (chairman); Paddy Burns (CTO)
- Subsidiaries: Chroma Ventures
- Website: 4jstudios.com

4J Studios Limited is a British video game developer based in Dundee. It has a second office located in Edinburgh (previously in East Linton). Founded in April 2005 by VIS Entertainment alumni Chris van der Kuyl, Paddy Burns and Frank Arnot, the company is best known for porting Mojang Studios' Minecraft to consoles and handheld platforms.

== History ==
4J Studios was founded by Chris van der Kuyl, Paddy Burns and Frank Arnot on 19 April 2005, twelve days after van der Kuyl's previous video game venture, VIS Entertainment, entered into administration. All three were previously employed by that company, with van der Kuyl as president and chief executive officer.

In November 2012, co-founder and studio director Arnot announced that he had left 4J Studios to establish Stormcloud Games with co-workers Andy West and Pat McGovern. In March 2018, 4J Studios invested a "six-figure sum" in Puny Astronaut, a Dundee-based developer founded by Abertay University alumni. 4J Studios' van der Kuyl and Burns subsequently joined that company's board of directors, with van der Kuyl also becoming the chairman. 4J Studios then opened an investment fund, Chroma Ventures, in March 2021, which absorbed the Puny Astronaut stake and invested in several other studios.

In October 2022, 4J Studios announced its intent to start publishing games, starting with Puny Astronaut's Skye Tales in 2023. In October 2024, Curve Games picked up the publishing rights for Skye Tales and 4J's own Manic Mechanics.

In May 2024, 4J Studios revealed a trailer of its next project, the Elements Engine, a proprietary 3D voxel sandbox game engine built from the ground up with world size and performance in mind. In September 2024, 4J Studios announced their new video game, Reforj, a voxel-based sandbox video game built on the Elements Engine. The development team includes the Minecraft YouTuber Joseph Garrett (better known as Stampy). Public playtests began in April 2025.

== Games ==
Year	Title	Platform(s)	Publisher(s)
2005	Breeders' Cup World Thoroughbred Championships	PlayStation 2, Xbox	Bethesda Softworks
2006	Star Trek: Encounters	PlayStation 2	Bethesda Softworks
2007	The Elder Scrolls IV: Oblivion (port)	PlayStation 3	Bethesda Softworks
2007	Star Trek: Conquest	PlayStation 2, Wii	Bethesda Softworks
2008	AMF Bowling Pinbusters!	Nintendo DS	Vir2L Studios
2008	Overlord: Raising Hell (port)	PlayStation 3	Codemasters
2008	Ducati Moto	Nintendo DS	Vir2L Studios
2008	Banjo-Kazooie (port)	Xbox 360	Microsoft Game Studios
2009	Banjo-Tooie (port)	Xbox 360	Microsoft Game Studios
2009	Wuggle	iOS	4J Studios
2009	Texas Wuggle	iOS	4J Studios
2010	Perfect Dark	Xbox 360	Microsoft Game Studios
2012	Minecraft: Xbox 360 Edition	Xbox 360	Microsoft Studios
2013	Minecraft: PlayStation 3 Edition	PlayStation 3	Sony Computer Entertainment
2014	Minecraft: Xbox One Edition	Xbox One	Microsoft Studios
2014	Minecraft: PlayStation 4 Edition	PlayStation 4	Sony Computer Entertainment
2014	Minecraft: PlayStation Vita Edition	PlayStation Vita	Sony Computer Entertainment
2015	Minecraft: Wii U Edition	Wii U	Mojang
2017	Minecraft: Nintendo Switch Edition	Nintendo Switch	Mojang
2023	Manic Mechanics	Nintendo Switch, PlayStation 4, PlayStation 5, Windows, Xbox One, Xbox Series X/S	4J Studios
TBA	Reforj	PlayStation 5, Windows, Xbox Series X/S	4J Studios

=== Cancelled ===
- Goldeneye 007 (Xbox 360, Microsoft Game Studios)
