= Far Lands or Bust =

Online gaming video series

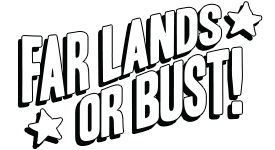
- Current logo for the series
- Created by: Kurt J. Mac
- Country of origin: United States
- Original language: English
- No. of seasons: 12 (Far Lands or Bust); 11 (FLoB-a-Thon); 1 (Far Lands and Beyond)
- No. of episodes: 853 (Far Lands or Bust); 295 (FLoB-a-Thon); 45 (Far Lands and Beyond)

Original release
- Network: YouTube
- Release: March 6, 2011 – present

Far Lands or Bust! (abbreviated FLoB) is an online video series created by Kurt J. Mac in which he plays the video game Minecraft. The series depicts his journey to the "Far Lands", a distant area of Minecraft worlds where, in certain old versions of the game, the terrain generation does not function correctly due to an integer overflow, creating a warped landscape. Kurt began traveling in March 2011, and completed his journey to the Far Lands on October 4, 2025. From season 13 onwards, the series has been renamed to Far Lands and Beyond (abbreviated FLaB), reflecting the changed nature of the series as the initial destination has now been reached.

Episodes of Far Lands or Bust typically act as a sort of podcast, with the game providing a backing track while Kurt discusses recent events in his life, news and science. The show also encourages viewers to donate to charity to reach fundraising goals. This charity of choice was originally Child's Play, for which the show raised over $400,000. From 2018 to 2019 and 2023 to 2024, the charity was Direct Relief. In 2020, the charity was the Progressive Animal Welfare Society (PAWS) in Washington, from which Kurt adopted his own dog, Juno, in 2017. On August 30 of the same year, Kurt announced he would no longer be using PAWS as his charity, mostly due to complications with their donation system, instead switching to supporting the Equal Justice Initiative. Since then, the series has supported the CDC Foundation, Rise Above The Disorder, Equality Texas, and UNRWA. The show holds the Guinness World Record for the longest journey in Minecraft.

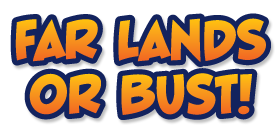
Previous logo used for the first 10 seasons from 2011 to 2022

== Format ==
The Far Lands

=== The Far Lands ===
Minecraft is a sandbox video game which places players in a 3D, procedurally generated world. As a player walks in any direction, the game generates terrain ahead of them, creating (in theory) a virtually infinite world for the player to explore. However, due to computational limits in earlier versions of the game, at a distance of roughly 12,550,821 blocks from the center of the world the terrain generation algorithm behaves unexpectedly, creating a sudden warped landscape. Markus Persson, popularly known as Notch, the original developer of Minecraft, commented that "Walking that far will take a very long time. Besides, the bugs add mystery and charisma to the Far Lands." The name "Far Lands" was adopted by the community to refer to this area. Persson also said it would be "impossible to reach the Far Lands" and Kurt took that as a challenge. However, the Far Lands are not the ultimate edge of the game world, which instead occurs at 2,147,483,647 blocks from the origin (the maximum value of a signed 32-bit integer) and crashes the game if one attempts to venture past it.

Due to changes to the game's code, recent versions of the game do not contain the same error, and terrain continues to generate normally at distances up to 30,000 kilometres (19,000 mi) from the center of the world. Kurt has continued to record his series in version Beta 1.7.3, the latest version of the game in which the Far Lands are still present. Persson estimated in 2014 that walking to the Far Lands would take approximately 800 hours.

Over 30 legitimate journeys to the Far Lands have been verified as of October 2023. About 1/3 have been completed (some using a 1/8th shortcut through the Nether dimension), 1/3 are in progress, and 1/3 have become inactive (including one death, TinfoilChef). For example, in June 2020, this goal was first reached by KilloCrazyMan and, in August 2022, it was reached by MysticalMidget, after 2,500 hours and 32 million blocks of walking.

=== F3 monuments ===
In the game, a debug screen can be opened by pressing the F3 key, which displays the player's current coordinates in the world. In Kurt's journey to the Far Lands, F3 is only pressed once each season's charity donations goal has been met, as a way to conclude the season. Additionally, he builds a monument to commemorate each occasion.

An exception to this was when he crossed a point where the floating-point error grew from two texture pixels to four. On August 8, 2020, Kurt witnessed an increase in the floating-point error jitter during a live stream (listed as episode 793.5). Kurt pressed F3 in the next episode, 794, to confirm he had hit the milestone of 4,194,304 blocks. He built a monument to mark the point. The next time this occurred was April 16, 2024, during that year's FLoB-a-thon, when he noticed the jitter increase again after 8,388,608 blocks of total progress.

=== Completion ===
Kurt reaching the Far Lands on October 4, 2025

In September 2025, AntVenom, a Minecraft YouTuber, predicted that Kurt was within 200,000 blocks of the Far Lands.

On October 4, 2025, Kurt reached the Far Lands during a specially planned Twitch stream. In a post on his YouTube channel, Kurt stated he intends to continue the series after reaching the Far Lands.

On December 31, 2025, the first post-Far Lands episode of the series kicked off season 13, along with a renaming of the series to Far Lands and Beyond going forward.

==== Progress summary ====
Season	F3 press	Episode	Date	Duration of the journey	Distance travelled			World size (MB)	Seasonal donations		Notes
Season	F3 press	Episode	Date	Duration of the journey	In blocks	%	Season progress	World size (MB)	Goal	Total raised	Notes
1	-	1	7 March 2011	-	-	-	-	Unknown	-	-	Creation of the map and beginning of Kurt's adventure.
1	-	11	28 March 2011	0 days	~ 0	~ 0%	-	Unknown	-	-	Beginning of the journey to the far lands.
1	-	30	27 May 2011	60 days	Unknown	Unknown	Unknown	Unknown	-	-	Ending of the first season. F3 was not pressed.
2	1	96	17 November 2011	234 days	292,202	2.33%	292,202	1,991.59	$8,200.00	$11,724.00	Donation goal was initially $820, then raised to $8,200 after it was reached in under a week.
3	2	178	1 September 2012	1 year, 157 days	699,492	5.57%	407,290	5,002.19	$29,220.00	$70,838.39	During this season, Kurt passed the first fairly noticeable jitter milestone at 524,288 (= 2^{19}).
4	3	334	6 March 2014	2 years, 343 days	1,479,940	11.79%	780,448	11,163.05	$100,000.00	$186,649.13	During this season, Kurt passed the jitter milestone at 1,048,576 (= 2^{20}).
5	4	490	28 March 2015	4 years, 0 days	2,266,779	18.06%	786,839	17,861.10	$50,000.00	$66,061.70	During this season, Kurt passed the jitter milestone at 2,097,152 (= 2^{21}).
6	5	640	22 January 2017	5 years, 300 days	3,116,936	24.83%	850,157	23,982.87	$60,000.00	$71,431.83	
7	6	755	31 August 2019	8 years, 156 days	3,857,848	30.74%	740,912	29,098.60	$50,000.00	Unknown	
8	7	794	11 August 2020	9 years, 136 days	4,194,303	33.42%	316,455	31,432.95	$8,200.00	Unknown	Not a season ending. Pressed to confirm the passage of the jitter milestone at 4,194,304 (= 2^{22}).
8	8	815	6 March 2021	9 years, 343 days	4,856,980	38.70%	999,132	36,088.17	$8,200.00	$18,093.04	
9	9	828	1 April 2022	11 years, 4 days	5,765,878	45.94%	908,898	42,359.70	$4,200.00	$4,680.00	
10	10	847	30 May 2023	12 years, 63 days	7,396,358	58.93%	1,630,480	53,605.40	Unknown	Unknown	
11	11	FLoB-a-Thon 2024 (Day 15)	16 April 2024	13 years, 19 days	8,388,608	66.84%	992,250	60,211.20	$7,396.35	Unknown	Not a season ending. Pressed to confirm the passage of the jitter milestone at 8,388,608 (= 2^{23}).
11	12	FLoB-a-Thon 2024 (Day 79)	25 July 2024	13 years, 119 days	9,864,725	78.60%	1,476,117	69,733.12	$7,396.35	$8,134.00	
12	13	FLoB-a-Thon 2025 (Day 69)	4 October 2025	14 years, 190 days	12,550,825	100%	2,686,100	86,603.55	$50,000.00	$42,773.00	Not a season ending. Pressed to show the Far Lands' location, one block inside of them.
12	-	853	4 December 2025	14 years, 251 days	12,550,825	100%	2,686,100	86,875.30	$50,000.00	$50,336.00	F3 was not pressed for this season finale as Kurt had not fundamentally progressed since reaching the Far Lands.
