= Star Trek: Encounters =

2006 video game

- Developer: 4J Studios
- Publishers: NA: Bethesda Softworks; EU/AU: Ubisoft
- Composer: Jason Graves
- Series: Star Trek
- Platform: PlayStation 2
- Release: NA: October 3, 2006; EU/AU: December 7, 2006
- Genres: Shoot 'em up, space simulation
- Modes: Single-player, multiplayer

Star Trek: Encounters is a video game set in the Star Trek fictional universe, which was released in 2006 for the PlayStation 2. The game was developed by Scottish studio 4J Studios for Bethesda Softworks (U.S. and Australia) and Ubisoft (EU).

== Gameplay ==
Encounters is an arcade style shoot 'em up game, and features ships and characters from five of the Star Trek series: Star Trek: The Original Series, Star Trek: The Next Generation, Star Trek: Deep Space Nine, Star Trek: Voyager, and Star Trek: Enterprise.

=== Skirmish ===
In the Skirmish section of the game, single and multiplayer options are available, although objectives remain the same in both modes.

"Head-to-Head" mode gives the player the chance to choose a ship to control, including unlocked ships from enemy factions, and to choose an opponent ship to fight against. The player then sets the score limit, or the number of frags.

In "Battlefest", the player chooses a pre-set group of three ships to fight another group of three ships. The player first starts with Ship 1, as does the enemy. When the first ship of either the player or the enemy is destroyed, the player or enemy respawns with Ship 2, then Ship 3 if Ship 2 is destroyed. The first to destroy all three of the opponent's ships wins.

"Onslaught" allows the player to only choose from the Starfleet ships currently unlocked in the game. Once a starship has been chosen, the player must continuously fight against an unending wave of ships. The goal is to destroy as many waves as possible. Waves become progressively more difficult to defeat, with more powerful ships in greater numbers with each new wave. In some intermittent waves, the player receives the message "Destroy the Station!", in which the player must defeat the Romulan Nestar Station and its probes.

=== Story missions ===
The story portion of the game consists of six sections. Five are based on television series (Star Trek: Enterprise, Star Trek: The Original Series, Star Trek: The Next Generation, Star Trek: Deep Space Nine, and Star Trek: Voyager), whilst the sixth section is based on the Enterprise-E, which first appeared in Star Trek: First Contact.

There is no overall story connecting the different sections (unlike in, say, Star Trek: Legacy); instead, each section has a self-contained storyline.

The Enterprise missions involve defending Earth from the Xindi threat. The first mission is a tutorial, in which the player must fight some Xindi fighters. The second mission involves locating the Xindi planet-destroying super weapon and destroying it before it destroys Earth. The last mission involves destroying construction orbs that make the parts for the super weapon.

The Original Series missions take place between Star Trek II: The Wrath of Khan and Star Trek III: The Search for Spock. The first mission involves the Enterprise escorting a Vulcan ambassador to peace talks with the Klingons. The next few missions see the player pursuing the Klingons. In the last mission, the Klingons are searching for fragments of the Genesis device (featured in Star Trek II) whilst the Genesis Planet explodes and the player must outrun the shockwave.

The Next Generation plot involves the Romulans. The mission starts with the discovery of a wormhole leading from Romulan Space into Federation space. After destroying the invading Romulans, the Enterprise-D enters the wormhole and destroys the Romulans on the other side, preventing them from re-entering. However, the Enterprise is then trapped inside of a giant "living" weapon, but after reactivating the creature's immune system, the Enterprise escapes.

The Deep Space Nine missions are set during the Dominion War. The first of two missions take place in the Badlands as the Defiant sets out to find some missing ships. In the final mission, Jem'Hadar ships warp into the area around Bajor, and the Defiant and Deep Space 9 must destroy them.

The Voyager missions involve the Kazon and the Borg. The first mission sees Voyager attempting to recover four artifacts revealing details about the "origin of life" in the universe. The second mission has Voyager facing the Borg as they attempt to assimilate planets in the Delta Quadrant. The third mission features Species 8472, and their fight against the Borg. The last mission sees Voyager escaping the Borg Queen.

The Enterprise-E missions start off with the Enterprise battling Orion Raiders, who have created a superweapon powered by antimatter. Aided by the Ferengi, the Enterprise prevents the Orion from firing. The last mission involves time travel and every ship from the game. After a battle, everything is put right, and the timeline is restored.

== Reception ==
Reception

Aggregate score
Aggregator	Score
Metacritic	51/100

Review scores
Publication	Score
Computer and Video Games	3/10
Game Informer	7.25/10
GameRevolution	B−
GameSpot	4.3/10
GameSpy	3/5
IGN	4.9/10
PlayStation Official Magazine – UK	2/10
PSM3	32%
X-Play	2/5

The game received mixed reviews. On Metacritic it has a score of 51% based on reviews from 17 critics, indicating "mixed or average reviews". Common criticisms included the lack of an overall storyline, poor graphics and controls, events which did not fit into established Star Trek canon, and repetitive, poorly implemented gameplay.

Juan Castro of IGN felt that the game didn't feel like a Star Trek game, arguing that "it feels much closer to playing a videogame about radio-controlled cars, only with a Star Trek skin. Sure, Encounters has phasers, sensors and photon torpedoes, and they even sound and look like their TV counterparts, but combat is less than riveting," and "Encounters suffers from a dire lack of Star Trek. There's very little point in using the Star Trek license without exploiting its greatest assets. Unfortunately, that's exactly what happens here. Take away the name and there's little here that resembles the long-running franchise at all. And while playing through different eras of the Trek timeline is a great concept, and definitely has its appeal, the actual gameplay doesn't do it justice. It's a bargain title, but even gamers strapped for cash need to know Encounters is Star Trek only in name, not in function."

Greg Damiano of Game Revolution said that "the game itself does nothing to draw you in. William Shatner delivers surprisingly muted, anonymous introductions to each episode before a series of anonymous text boxes explain your objectives. A little radio chatter would punctuate the action, but the game is deadly silent. Encounters throws a few hooks out there, like a planet-killer boss, but it doesn't follow through. If I saw that planet-killer kill a planet, I would be interested in stopping it...but it doesn't, so meh! Who stays with a game that can't follow through like that?"

Benjamin Turner of GameSpy stated that "the controls are surprisingly awkward; this may be by design, but it's certainly not necessary. Tutorials will get you up to speed, but the game is still annoying to control in the heat of combat. Particularly irksome are the target lock-on and firing controls, which occupy R2 and R1. My right hand slowly turned into a twisted claw as I maintained a death grip on the lock-on button while trying to also nudge fire. Eventually I had to hold the controller in a whole new way just to alleviate the hand pain."

Kevin VanOrd of GameSpot was especially critical of the gameplay, stating that "the gameplay is a mishmash of mediocre game design, simply stretching the combat as far as possible. In fact, cheap deaths and empty periods of absolutely nothing extend the missions longer than necessary. It's a short campaign, but it wears on seemingly forever since there just aren't a lot of fun activities to do. There's no exploration in the game, yet you'll be flying for extended stretches to get from point A to point B without anything new to see or eye candy to gawk at. Other attempts to break up the tedium are hit or miss. Objectives requiring you to beam crew members elsewhere or use a tractor beam to escort a damaged ship to safety are fine. Others, like following a rogue enemy's warp trail, are boring and frustrating. Losing the trail for more than a few seconds ends the mission, and the random minefields that just happen to be littering the path provide cheap deaths." He concluded, "No Trekkie wants to hate a game based on his or her favorite universe, but it's impossible to expect even the most stalwart devotee to like Star Trek: Encounters, even at its low price point. It fails at almost every conceivable level, both as a game and as a licensed product. If you've been waiting for a Star Trek game, spare yourself the frustration and keep waiting, since your imagination is bound to be more appealing than this budget-priced fiasco."
