= Minecraft: Story Mode =

2015 video game

- Developer: Telltale Games
- Publisher: Telltale Games
- Composers: Antimo & Welles
- Series: Minecraft
- Engine: Telltale Tool
- Platforms: Android; iOS; iPadOS; Fire OS; Apple TV; Windows; Nintendo Switch; macOS; PlayStation 3; PlayStation 4; Wii U; Xbox 360; Xbox One; Netflix
- Release: Season 1 Episode 1: Windows, macOS, PlayStation 3, PlayStation 4, Xbox 360, Xbox One; WW: October 13, 2015 Android, iOS; WW: October 15, 2015 Wii U; WW: January 21, 2016; Episode 2: Android, iOS, Windows, macOS, PlayStation 3, PlayStation 4, Xbox 360, Xbox One; WW: October 27, 2015; Episode 3: Android, iOS, Windows, macOS, PlayStation 3, PlayStation 4, Xbox 360, Xbox One; WW: November 24, 2015; Episode 4: Android, iOS, Windows, macOS, PlayStation 3, PlayStation 4, Xbox 360, Xbox One; WW: December 22, 2015; Episode 5: Android, iOS, Windows, macOS, PlayStation 3, PlayStation 4, Xbox 360, Xbox One; WW: March 29, 2016; Episode 6: Android, iOS, Windows, macOS, PlayStation 3, PlayStation 4, Xbox 360, Xbox One; WW: June 7, 2016; Episode 7: Android, iOS, Windows, macOS, PlayStation 3, PlayStation 4, Xbox 360, Xbox One; WW: July 26, 2016; Episode 8: Android, iOS, Windows, macOS, PlayStation 3, PlayStation 4, Xbox 360, Xbox One; WW: September 13, 2016; The Complete Adventure: Xbox 360, Xbox One, PlayStation 3, PlayStation 4, Windows; NA: October 25, 2016; EU: October 28, 2016 Wii U; EU: December 16, 2016; NA: December 13, 2016; AU: December 16, 2016 Nintendo Switch; WW: August 22, 2017; Season 2 Episode 1: Windows, PlayStation 4, Xbox One, iOS; WW: July 11, 2017 Android; WW: July 12, 2017 Xbox 360; WW: July 14, 2017 Nintendo Switch; WW: November 6, 2018; Episode 2: August 15, 2017; Episode 3: September 19, 2017; Episode 4: November 7, 2017; Episode 5: December 19, 2017
- Genres: Graphic adventure Interactive film
- Mode: Single-player

Minecraft: Story Mode is a discontinued episodic point-and-click video game developed and published by Telltale Games, based on Mojang Studios' sandbox game Minecraft. The first five episodes were released from October 2015 to March 2016, and an additional three episodes were released as downloadable content (DLC) in mid-2016. A second season consisting of five episodes was released from July to December 2017.

The game follows the same episodic format as other Telltale Games titles, such as The Walking Dead, The Wolf Among Us, Tales from the Borderlands, and Game of Thrones. The story revolves around a player-created character named Jesse, an everyman who is drawn into an adventure to save the world alongside their friends. In the first four episodes, Jesse and their friends attempt to reunite an old group of heroes called the Order of the Stone to save their world from the destructive Wither Storm. The rest of the first season follows Jesse and their friends as the new Order of the Stone on another adventure after discovering an enchanted artifact. In the second season, Jesse faces the powerful Admin.

Minecraft: Story Mode was available for Windows, macOS, PlayStation 3, PlayStation 4, Wii U, Nintendo Switch, Xbox 360, Xbox One, Android, iOS and Apple TV. A retail version was released in December 2016, and the first season, excluding the DLC episodes, was released on Netflix in late 2018. However, both seasons were removed from digital storefronts due to the closure of Telltale Games in late 2018, causing Minecraft: Story Mode to be ultimately discontinued on June 25, 2019. The Netflix release was removed on December 5, 2022. The game received mixed reviews from critics.

== Gameplay ==
Minecraft: Story Mode is an episodic interactive comedy-drama point-and-click graphic adventure video game. It was released as a number of episodes similar to Telltale Games' other games. Players can collect items, solve puzzles, and talk to non-player characters through conversation trees to learn about the story and determine what to do next. Decisions that the player makes affect events in both the current episode and later episodes. However, Minecraft: Story Mode is intended to be a family-friendly title, unlike Telltale's previous games, which tend to carry more mature or emotional overtones (including the deaths of major characters). As such, the decisions are intended to be pivotal and emotional but not to involve mature imagery or themes. Elements of crafting and building were included in the gameplay which are central to Minecraft. Combat and other action sequences are present in the game, carried out through both quick time events and more arcade-like controls, such as steering around debris on a road.

The Netflix version of the first season (excluding the Adventure Pass episodes) was fully pre-rendered, using an enhanced version of the Telltale Tool. It incorporates limited choices compared to other versions and restricts players to picking between two character models for Jesse (one for the male version, and one for the female version).

== Synopsis ==
=== Setting ===
Minecraft: Story Mode takes place in an interpretation of the world of Minecraft, known as the "Overworld", where it is the extent of the characters' universe, and the characters are unaware that they are in a game. The main character, Jesse, is an inexperienced resident of said universe who sets out on a journey with their friends to find the Order of the Stone (Gabriel the Warrior, Ellegaard the Redstone Engineer, Magnus the Rogue, Soren the Architect, and Ivor the Potion Brewer and Enchanter), five legendary adventurers who saved the Minecraft world in the past. The game includes settings that are normally difficult to access from within Minecraft, such as the Nether and the End.

=== Characters ===
The game's protagonist and playable character is Jesse, whose appearance can be customized by the player; six character models are available to choose from, featuring different genders, skin tones, and clothing. Jesse is voiced by Patton Oswalt if male and by Catherine Taber if female. Other main characters within the Minecraft: Story Mode world include Jesse's friends Petra (voiced by Ashley Johnson), Axel (Brian Posehn), Olivia (Martha Plimpton, Natasha Loring), Lukas (Scott Porter), and Jesse's pet pig, Reuben (Dee Bradley Baker).

The first season features several characters in supporting roles, including the Order of the Stone—Gabriel (Dave Fennoy), Magnus (Corey Feldman), Ellegaard (Grey Griffin), Soren (John Hodgman), and Ivor (Paul Reubens), the latter of whom becomes a main character from episode five onwards; former Ocelot member and Blaze Rods leader Aiden (Matthew Mercer); the ruler of Sky City, the Founder (Melissa Hutchison); Milo (Jim Meskimen), the leader of an underground building club; Minecraft YouTubers CaptainSparklez, DanTDM, LDShadowLady, Stampy Cat, and Stacy Plays (all voiced by themselves); Torque Dawg (Adam Harrington); Cassie Rose (Ashly Burch, with Roger L. Jackson voicing the character's "White Pumpkin" disguise); the super-computer PAMA (Jason 'jtop' Topolski); PAMA's creator and former Old Builder Harper (Yvette Nicole Brown); the warrior Emily (Audrey Wasilewski); and the Old Builders—Hadrian (Jim Cummings), Mevia (Kari Wahlgren), and Otto (Jamie Alcroft). The second season introduces new supporting characters, namely Jesse's assistant Radar (Yuri Lowenthal), the famous hero Jack (Fred Tatasciore) and his villager sidekick Nurm (Mark Barbolak), Champion City ruler Stella (Ashley Albert) and her treasure-sniffing llama Lluna, and the sinister Admin, whose real name is Romeo (JB Blanc).

There are also several background characters, such as Maya, Ivy, and a Fangirl (GK Bowes); Owen (Owen Hill); Gill (Phil LaMarr); an EnderCon Usher named Reuben (also Jason 'jtop' Topolski); a Fanboy (Billy West); Lydia (Lydia Winters); and the EnderCon Building Competition Announcer (Erin Yvette). Job Stauffer has stated that the human characters as a whole represent the different types of gamers who play Minecraft. Billy West narrates the first four episodes of the story.

=== Plot ===
This is a broad overview of the plot. Certain decisions made by the player will alter the details of specific events.

==== Season One ====
A flashback narrates the tale of the "Order of the Stone", a group of four legendary heroes (Gabriel, Ellegaard, Magnus, and Soren) who defeated the Ender Dragon many years ago. In the present, Jesse, their (Note: Jesse can be either male or female depending on the player's choice.) friends Axel and Olivia, and their pet pig Reuben prepare for the EnderCon building competition, where the winning team will get to meet Gabriel. The Ocelots, another team led by Jesse's rival Lukas, attempt to sabotage their project, scaring Reuben. While chasing after Reuben, Jesse is rescued from monsters by a mercenary-for-hire, Petra. Petra invites Jesse to join her in selling a Wither skull to a customer named Ivor. While Jesse and their friends are preparing to meet Gabriel, Ivor interrupts the event and constructs a "Wither Storm" monster to attack Gabriel. Gabriel is unable to defeat the monster and attempts to lead Jesse's gang, as well as Lukas, to safety. As the monster catches up with them, Gabriel tells Jesse that they must find and reunite the other three members of the Order of the Stone. The Wither Storm then captures both Petra and Gabriel, with Jesse saving one of them.

After escaping the Wither Storm, the group flee to the Order's abandoned temple, where they discover that Ivor was a member of the Order but was removed from the official stories for unknown reasons. Axel and Olivia then set off to find Magnus and Ellegaard, respectively, with Jesse joining one of them. Once both of them are recruited, the group track down Soren, who is believed to possess an immensely powerful bomb that could destroy the Wither Storm. Jesse uses the bomb and the Wither Storm is ripped apart, although either Magnus or Ellegaard dies in the process. The monster quickly reforms, attempting to capture Jesse, who is rescued by either Petra or Gabriel (whichever the player did not save), although they have developed amnesia. Ivor resurfaces and offers the group his help, taking them to his lab to construct an enchanted weapon to use against the Wither Storm. At the lab, Jesse learns that the Order are frauds and fabricated the story of how they defeated the Ender Dragon. Ivor explains that he fell out with the rest of the Order over their lies, and created the Wither Storm to show the world the truth. Jesse builds the enchanted weapon and destroys the Wither Storm's command block, killing the monster, but not before it mortally wounds Reuben. With Gabriel acknowledging that Jesse's group are real heroes, he crowns them the new Order of the Stone.

Some time later, the new Order have become heroes and, on one of their adventures, stumble upon an enchanted flint and steel that can open portals to other worlds. They show it to Ivor, who believes that the device is the work of a group known as the "Old Builders", who supposedly possess infinite building resources. Jesse, Ivor, Lukas, and Petra investigate, ending up in Sky City, a floating city where building is forbidden due to the limited resources. The group is followed by the remnants of the Ocelots, who are jealous of their old rivals' fame and manipulate Sky City's ruler, the Founder, into turning against the Order. After the Ocelots seize control of the city, the Order defeat them and persuade the Founder to lift the building ban. They then attempt to use the flint and steel to return home, only to find themselves in a portal-filled corridor.

Traveling through the portals, the group arrive at a mansion full of Minecraft YouTubers, who are being systematically murdered by the mysterious "White Pumpkin" in search of the enchanted flint and steel. Jesse solves the mystery and defeats the White Pumpkin, who sought to use the flint and steel to leave the mansion after being stranded there for years. Returning to the portal corridor, the group travel to more worlds, eventually arriving in a desert ruled by PAMA, a supercomputer who has created a hive mind of humans and monsters. With the aid of PAMA's creator, Harper, the group destroy PAMA and free everyone under its control. Harper then reveals herself as a former Old Builder and takes the group to her home world, where the other Old Builders reside. Taking Jesse's friends hostage, the Old Builders force Jesse to partake in a series of dangerous games hosted by them, promising to help the group return home if Jesse wins. After realizing the games are rigged to ensure no one can win them, Jesse stages a rebellion among the players and defeats the Old Builders, rescuing their friends and securing the means to return home.

==== Season Two ====
While adventuring with Petra, Jesse, now the mayor of Beacontown, comes across a bottomless pit with a mysterious Prismarine gauntlet inside, which attaches to Jesse's hand. Seeking a way to remove the gauntlet, the pair travel to an ocean monument alongside Jack, a renowned adventurer, and his villager friend Nurm. There, they encounter a powerful entity known as the "Admin" and narrowly escape, though either Petra or Jack is injured in the process. Returning to Beacontown, the group is followed by the Admin, who takes the form of a Prismarine Colossus and begins destroying the city. Jesse stops the Admin's rampage and destroys the Colossus, but the Admin returns as a snowman. He challenges Jesse and their friends – joined by Jesse's new intern Radar, Stella, the leader of rival town Champion City, and her pet llama Lluna – to retrieve a giant clock from his ice palace. After tackling various challenges and destroying the clock, Vos, Jack's supposed old friend, reveals himself to have been the Admin all along and imprisons Jesse and their friends at the Sunshine Institute.

At the Institute, the group frees former Admin Xara and stages a breakout, though either Nurm or Lluna must remain behind to prevent her cell's trap from triggering. The group then heads to the Oasis, Xara's old town, where she reveals that the Admin's real name is Romeo and that there was a third Admin, Fred, who, prior to his death, created a weapon capable of stripping Romeo of his powers. After helping the people of the Oasis, Jesse, Petra, and Jack head back up in preparation to fight Romeo. As a show of power to the residents of Beacontown, Romeo, who has impersonated Jesse, either destroys Champion City or, if Jesse did not give Xara her bed at the Oasis, strangles her to death when she attempts to attack him.

As Romeo begins to cover the world in bedrock, Jesse's group arrives at the "Terminal Space", the Admin's home, where Jesse obtains Fred's gauntlet. Jesse fights Romeo and strips him of his powers before either leaving him for dead or offering him a chance at redemption. If the player previously left Fred's people for dead, Romeo will sacrifice himself to distract the monsters in the Terminal Space, allowing Jesse and their friends to escape. As the group returns home to Beacontown, Petra decides to leave to go on further adventures; the player can choose to have Jesse accompany her, potentially leaving Radar to act as mayor, or stay in Beacontown.

== Episodes ==
Season	Episodes	Originally released	
Season	Episodes	First released	Last released
1	8	October 13, 2015	September 13, 2016
2	5	July 11, 2017	December 19, 2017

=== Season One (2015–16) ===
The main Minecraft: Story Mode game was separated into five episodes for its first season, released in one month intervals. Three additional episodes were later released.

No. overall	No. in season	Title	Directed by	Written by	Original release date
1	1	"The Order of the Stone"	Dennis Lenart and Graham Ross	Michael Choung and Laura Jacqmin	October 13, 2015
At Endercon, a world-threatening monster known as the Wither Storm is unleashed. It is up to Jesse and their friends to reassemble the Order of the Stone, a group of adventurers famous for slaying the Ender Dragon.
2	2	"Assembly Required"	Jason Latino	Joshua Rubin, Eric Stirpe and Timothy Williams	October 27, 2015
Jesse and their friends must recruit the remaining members of the Order to help defeat the Wither Storm.
3	3	"The Last Place You Look"	Jonathan Stauder	Michael Choung, Laura Jacqmin, Eric Stirpe and Timothy Williams	November 24, 2015
Trapped inside of Soren's fortress, Jesse and their friends must find Soren to build a weapon that can destroy the Wither Storm.
4	4	"A Block and a Hard Place"	Graham Ross and Rebekah Gamin Arcovitch	Brad Kane and Laura Jacqmin	December 22, 2015
After a crushing defeat, Jesse and their friends must go on a long journey to the Far Lands to find the one thing capable of destroying the Command Block at the Wither Storm's core. Along the way, Jesse and friends make a shocking discovery about the Order's history.
5	5	"Order Up!"	Jonathan Stauder	Eric Stirpe and Timothy Williams	March 29, 2016
Jesse, Petra, Lukas, and Ivor find a mysterious portal and wind up in a strange place called Sky City. After being framed for supposed crimes, Jesse and their friends must clear their names and stop an old enemy from destroying an innocent world.
6	6	"A Portal to Mystery"	Sean Manning	Eric Stirpe and Timothy Williams	June 7, 2016
Jesse and their friends end up in a room full of portals and must find a portal leading to the overworld. The first portal they go to leads to a party in a mansion. However, one guest is killing off the others. Can Jesse and friends find the killer? Or will the killer find them? This episode features five Minecraft YouTubers as in-game avatars of themselves: Joseph "Stampy Cat" Garrett, Stacy "StacyPlays" Hinojosa, Daniel "DanTDM" Middleton, Elizabeth "Lizzie" Dwyer, and Jordan "CaptainSparklez" Maron.
7	7	"Access Denied"	Rebekah Gamin Arcovitch and Jason Pyke	Luke McMullen and Eric Stirpe	July 26, 2016
Continuing their portal journey in search of home, Jesse and crew land in a world entirely controlled by PAMA – a sinister "thinking machine" determined to command everyone and everything with redstone mind control chips. Forced on the run to avoid capture and assimilation, Jesse must work with a new ally to defeat the corrupted computer and free the population it has enslaved.
8	8	"A Journey's End?"	Vahram Antonian	Eric Stirpe, Yale Hannon, and Erica Harrell	September 13, 2016
Jesse, Petra, Lukas, and Ivor try to find the Old Builders, who can supposedly help them find their way home. However, if Jesse is to survive the Old Builders' Gladiator Games and get home, he/she must forge new friendships with the other contestants and navigate a labyrinth of lies and deception.

=== Season Two (2017) ===
In July 2017, the first trailer was released for the second season, along with a release date of July 11.

No. overall	No. in season	Title	Directed by	Written by	Original release date
9	1	"Hero in Residence"	Jonathan Stauder	Eric Stirpe	July 11, 2017
As old friends and new responsibilities pull Jesse in different directions, the discovery of a strange Prismarine Gauntlet leads our hero into a whole new world of mystery and danger.
10	2	"Giant Consequences"	Sean Manning	Meredith Ainsworth	August 15, 2017
A powerful foe emerges in Beacontown and subjects Jesse to some bizarre (and deadly) challenges. Friendships will be tested and new alliances formed as Jesse fights to save the world from this mighty enemy.
11	3	"Jailhouse Block"	Christopher Rieser	Adam Douglas	September 19, 2017
Jesse and the gang must brave a dangerous prison and its even more dangerous inmates to reach the secret at the prison's heart... But when the enemy tries to recruit Jesse's friends, will they all be able to resist the call?
12	4	"Below the Bedrock"	Daniel Rosales	Nicole Martinez, Meredith Ainsworth, and Doug Lieblich	November 7, 2017
Our heroes take a journey to a long-forgotten land where nothing is quite what it seems and danger lurks around every corner. Will Jesse's new alliances and friendships withstand the tests they'll face?
13	5	"Above and Beyond"	Mark Droste	Adam Miller, Meredith Ainsworth, Doug Lieblich, and Nicole Martinez	December 19, 2017
The final battle with Jesse's new enemy brings the battle home to Beacontown and the world may never be the same.

== Development and releases ==
The idea for Minecraft: Story Mode came around the end of 2012 when Telltale Games was engaged in work for Tales from the Borderlands, an episodic series based on the Borderlands series. The idea of developing stories around other established video game franchises led the team to brainstorm the idea for a Minecraft-related game, given that Minecraft: Story Mode was essentially a "blank canvas" for storytelling, according to Job Stauffer, and would create an interesting challenge. The two groups recognized the amount of fan-generated narrative content that existed in the way of YouTube videos and other media forms that demonstrated the potential for storytelling. Many on Telltale's staff were also already fans of Minecraft, with a private server that they played on, with some of the incidents that occurred on there becoming ideas for the story. Telltale began negotiations with Mojang in early 2013 and began work on the title shortly thereafter. Stauffer noted that Microsoft's acquisition of Mojang was not a factor in the development, as their interaction with Mojang began well before Microsoft's negotiations.

Telltale opted to create a new main character of Jesse for Minecraft: Story Mode instead of using default "Steve" character from Minecraft, feeling that they did not want to attempt to rewrite how players already saw this character in it. Other primary characters are loosely designed around archetypes of common player-characters for Minecraft, such that those that engage in building, fighting, or griefing other players. Minecraft: Story Mode did not attempt to provide any background for some concepts in Minecraft, such as the creepers, as to avoid the various interpretations that fans have done for these elements, though they are elements of the story.

Stauffer stated that Minecraft: Story Mode's story would be aimed as family-friendly, similar to the films The Goonies or Ghostbusters; their intended content would be equivalent to a PG-13 or PEGI-12 rating. A number of the voice actors are alumni of such films of the 1980s, like Corey Feldman who starred in The Goonies, and the game includes various references to these types of films. Stauffer reflected that while Telltale's more recent games like The Walking Dead were more mature stories, their original adventure games like Sam & Max and Strong Bad's Cool Game for Attractive People were written as family-friendly, and that they consider their approach to Minecraft: Story Mode as "part of our DNA". The story was aimed to be accessible to both existing players of Minecraft – both novice and advanced players – and to new audiences.

Minecraft: Story Mode was formally announced in December 2014 as a collaboration project between Mojang and Telltale; the announcement was presented as an interactive adventure game named "Info Quest II". Its first trailer was released during the Minecon 2015 convention in early July. Minecraft: Story Mode was planned as a five-episode series for release on Android, iOS, Windows, OS X, PlayStation and Xbox consoles in late 2015; Telltale also released it for the Wii U, only a month after the original Minecraft first came to a Nintendo platform. It was also the first time a Telltale title had been released on a Nintendo platform since Back to the Future: The Game. In addition, Minecraft: Story Mode – The Complete Adventure, incorporating both the main episodes and downloadable content, was announced for the Nintendo Switch.

The series released for most systems on October 13, 2015, with the PlayStation Vita and Wii U versions to follow at a later date. A season pass was available for purchase on October 27, 2015, which allows the player to access the other four episodes once they released. Retail versions were released on October 27, 2015.

Netflix and Telltale signed a partnership in June 2018 for Netflix to offer Telltale's games over the service starting later that year, with Minecraft: Story Mode as the first planned title for the service. Amid troubles related to the bankruptcy of Telltale Games in October and November 2018, sufficient staff remained with Telltale to complete work on this version, which was released onto Netflix on November 27 and December 5, 2018. It was removed on December 5, 2022.

=== Season Two ===
The first episode of Minecraft: Story Mode – Season Two was released on July 11, 2017, for Windows, macOS, PlayStation 4, Xbox 360, Xbox One, iOS and Android. It continued the story from the first season, with the player's choices affecting elements within Season Two. Patton Oswalt, Catherine Taber, Ashley Johnson, and Scott Porter were confirmed to continue voicework for the new season. Minecraft: Story Mode supports the new Crowd Play feature that Telltale introduced in Batman: The Telltale Series, allowing up to 2,000 audience members to vote on decisions for the player using Twitch or other streaming services.

On August 3, 2017, Telltale announced that the second episode, "Giant Consequences", would be released on August 15. The rest of the episodes were released on September 19, November 7, and December 19, 2017.

=== Closure of Telltale Games ===
In November 2018, Telltale Games began the process of closing down the studio due to financial issues. Most of its games started to become delisted from digital storefronts, including Minecraft: Story Mode. According to GOG.com, they had to pull the title due to "expiring licensing rights". The Minecraft team stated that even for those that had purchased the titles before their delisting, the episodes would no longer be downloadable after June 2019. Because the Xbox Live Marketplace does not allow for removing games from sale while at the same time allowing existing owners to download Minecraft: Story Mode, each episode of the Xbox 360 version was repriced to $100 in the few weeks ahead of the delisting to deter users from purchasing them.

Following the closure of Telltale, Antimo, one of Minecraft: Story Mode's composers, stated that there was legal confusion as to where the rights to the soundtrack lie, leading to the soundtrack only being available for streaming on SoundCloud and YouTube, where it was released before the closure of Telltale.

== Soundtrack ==
Minecraft: Story Mode features an original soundtrack composed by American duo Antimo & Welles, consisting of Skyler Barto (Antimo) and Andrew Arcadi (Welles). The soundtrack for the first season consists of 42 tracks, while the soundtrack for the second season has 51 tracks. On December 21, 2018, during the closure of Telltale, the duo released Story Mode Archives, an album consisting of 18 unused tracks. Several more tracks were re-released in late 2021.

== Reception ==
Reviews for Season 1
Game	Metacritic
Episode 1: The Order of the Stone	(PC) 71 (PS4) 71 (XONE) 77
Episode 2: Assembly Required	(PC) 59 (PS4) 53 (XONE) 61
Episode 3: The Last Place You Look	(PC) 73 (PS4) 73 (XONE) 75
Episode 4: A Block and a Hard Place	(PC) 68 (PS4) 72 (XONE) 71
Episode 5: Order Up!	(PC) 70 (PS4) 72 (XONE) 69
Episode 6: A Portal to Mystery	(PC) 64 (PS4) 69 (XONE) 71
Episode 7: Access Denied	(PC) 69 (PS4) 68 (XONE) 71
Episode 8: A Journey's End?	(PS4) 69

Minecraft: Story Mode received "mixed" from critics, with the Nintendo Switch version earning a weighted average of 67 based on 5 critics.

=== Season One ===
"Episode 1: The Order of the Stone" received positive reviews. Aggregating review website Metacritic gave the Windows version 71/100 based on 25 reviews, the PlayStation 4 version 71/100 based on 23 reviews and the Xbox One version 77/100 based on 13 reviews. On GameRankings, a score of 78.59% was given based on 11 reviews for the Xbox One version, 77.50% for Wii U based on 4 reviews, 73.53% for the PC version based on 16 reviews, and 73.29% for PlayStation 4 based on 21 reviews.

"Episode 2: Assembly Required" received mixed reviews. Metacritic gave the Windows version 59/100 based on 13 reviews, the PlayStation 4 version 53/100 based on 7 reviews and the Xbox One version 61/100 based on 8 reviews.

"Episode 3: The Last Place You Look" received mixed reviews. Metacritic gave the Windows version 73/100 based on 10 reviews, the PlayStation 4 version 73/100 based on 7 reviews and the Xbox One version 75/100 based on 9 reviews.

"Episode 4: A Block and a Hard Place" received mixed reviews. Metacritic gave the Windows version 68/100 based on 8 reviews, the PlayStation 4 version 72/100 based on 8 reviews and the Xbox One version 71/100 based on 8 reviews.

"Episode 5: Order Up!" received mixed reviews. Metacritic gave the Windows version 70/100 based on 6 reviews, the PlayStation 4 version 72/100 based on 9 reviews and the Xbox One version 69/100 based on 6 reviews.

"Episode 6: A Portal to Mystery" received mixed reviews. Metacritic gave the Windows version 64/100 based on 5 reviews, the PlayStation 4 version 69/100 based on 6 reviews and the Xbox One version 71/100 based on 5 reviews.

"Episode 7: Access Denied" received mixed reviews. Metacritic gave the Windows version 69/100 based on 4 reviews, the PlayStation 4 version 68/100 based on 6 reviews and the Xbox One version 71/100 based on 5 reviews.

"Episode 8: A Journey's End?" received mixed reviews. Metacritic gave the PlayStation 4 version 69/100 based on 6 reviews.

=== Season Two ===
Reviews for Season 2
Game	Metacritic
Episode 1: Hero in Residence	(PC) 71 (PS4) 67 (XONE) 76
Episode 2: Giant Consequences	(PC) 74 (PS4) 73 (XONE) 76
Episode 3: Jailhouse Block	(PC) 71 (PS4) 63 (XONE) 72
Episode 4: Below the Bedrock	(PC) 73
Episode 5: Above And Beyond	(PC) 78

"Episode 1: Hero in Residence" received mixed reviews. Metacritic gave the PC version 71/100 based on 8 reviews, the PlayStation 4 version 67/100 based on 8 reviews, and the Xbox One version 76/100 based on 4 reviews.

"Episode 2: Giant Consequences" received mixed reviews. Metacritic gave the PC version 74/100 based on 8 critics and the PlayStation 4 version a score of 73/100 based on 4 reviews. On GameRankings, the PlayStation 4 version has a rating of 65.00% based on 2 reviews and on the PC version, it has a score of 72.86% based on 7 reviews.

"Episode 3: Jailhouse Block" received mixed reviews. Metacritic gave the PC version 71/100, based on 8 reviews, and the PlayStation 4 63/100 based on 4 reviews.

"Episode 4: Below the Bedrock" received mixed reviews. Metacritic gave the PC version a score of 74/100 based on 5 critics.

"Episode 5: Above and Beyond" received mixed reviews. Metacritic gave the PC version a score of 78/100 based on 4 critics.
