= Stampy =

English YouTuber (born 1990)

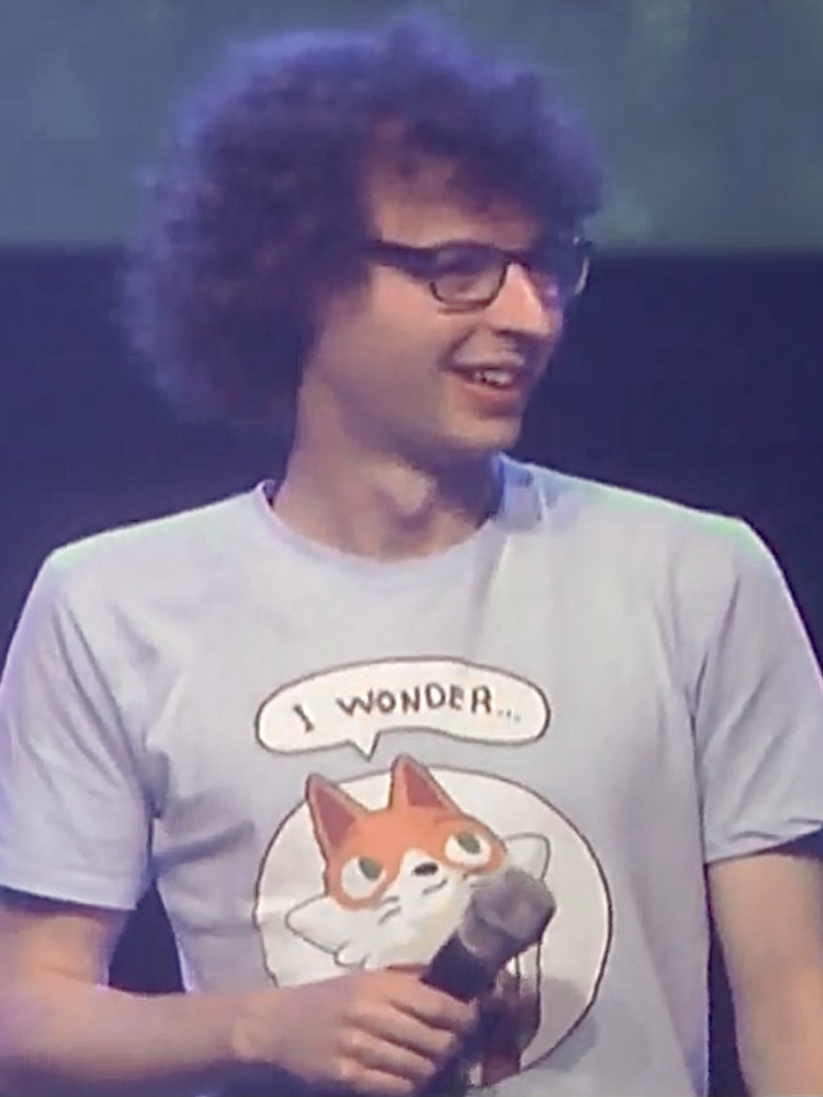
- Garrett in 2015
- Born: Joseph Garrett; 13 December 1990 (age 35); Portsmouth, Hampshire, England
- Other names: Stampylongnose; Stampy Cat
- Education: Southampton Solent University
- Occupations: YouTuber; video game producer; actor; author
- Known for: Minecraft Let's Play videos
- Spouse: Kye Bates (m. 2019; sep. 2024)

YouTube information
- Channel: stampylonghead
- Years active: 2006–present
- Genre: Gaming
- Subscribers: 10.9 million
- Views: 8.18 billion
- Last updated: 23 October 2026

Joseph Garrett (born 13 December 1990), better known as Stampylonghead, Stampylongnose, Stampy Cat, or simply Stampy (/ˈstæmpi/), is an English YouTuber, video game producer, actor, and author best known for his Minecraft video game commentaries as the character of Stampy Cat. He is well known for his child-friendly demeanour and incorporating storytelling and education into the Let's Play format. In 2014, he was one of the ten most-watched YouTube channels in the world.

In 2015 Garrett created a scripted edutainment series called Wonder Quest in collaboration with Maker Studios and Disney. The show was filmed in Minecraft and features educational content designed for children to watch in school. It aired two seasons from 2015 to 2016. Garrett has voiced the Stampy character in the video game Minecraft: Story Mode and has made guest appearances on several television programmes with CBBC and Disney XD. He has also released two children's books, and is in the process of writing a series of young adult novels.

As of May 2026, Garrett's main channel, Stampylonghead, has gained over 8.16 billion video views and over 10.9 million subscribers. In 2015 his channel received 200 million monthly views, with each video averaging 1.87 million views. In 2023, Garret ended his long-running Minecraft YouTube series Stampy's Lovely World. In January 2024, he began working for 4J Studios in the development of a game named Reforj.

== Early life and education ==
Joseph Garrett was born on 13 December 1990, in the city of Portsmouth, in Hampshire, England, and grew up in Havant. He has two older sisters, Rachel and Annette, the latter of whom also has a Minecraft YouTube channel.

Garrett studied TV and video production at Solent University in Southampton. He enjoyed creating stop-motion films and wanted to be an editor or vision mixer, wanting to work on projects entirely by himself.

== YouTube career ==
In August 2006, Garrett created his first YouTube channel, the Stampylongnose channel. Initially, his channel consisted of live-action comedy skits and animations he made with his friends. He later transitioned to Let's Play videos of video games. Garrett eventually removed this older content from the channel. He resumed uploading on this channel in 2016, where he created primarily non-gaming videos such as vlogs, 'Behind The Scenes' videos, and later 'Book Diary', where Garrett would talk about his progress on writing his novels.

=== Minecraft ===
"Crazy Golf Course" is one of the oldest episodes of the Stampy's Lovely World series, uploaded on 22 September 2012.

Garrett launched his second channel, the Stampylonghead channel, on 29 July 2011. He began making Minecraft Let's Play videos in 2012, including his most popular series, Stampy's Lovely World. Garrett has described the channel as a "complete accident," saying his original aim was to become a video game journalist. He attributed some of his popularity to his then-daily upload schedule, saying that this ensured his audience knew they could return regularly to find new content to watch. In 2014, he reported to record, edit, and upload his videos himself, while delegating his business affairs to Maker Studios. The Stampylonghead channel was once mistakenly terminated by YouTube in December 2013 due to false reports of community guidelines violations. After widespread campaigning under the Twitter hashtag "#savestampy" began to trend, the channel was reinstated a day later. Garrett attended San Diego Comic-Con for the first time in 2014. In 2014, Garrett's channel was the fourth most-viewed on the entire platform, behind Katy Perry and ahead of Shakira.

On 25 April 2015, Garrett launched a spin-off edutainment YouTube series, Wonder Quest, in collaboration with Maker Studios. The series is told through Minecraft and is designed for educational use in classrooms. American author Jordan Shapiro praised the show for demonstrating the educational potential of Minecraft. Garrett, upon being asked if he would be interested in transitioning to television, stated that he was happy remaining on YouTube. Garrett was a featured panellist at Minecon in July 2015. He attended Minecon again in 2016. In September 2015, Garrett signed a two-book deal with Egmont Publishing. Stampy's Lovely Book, released on 22 October 2015, is a children's activity book themed around Stampy Cat. Stampy's Lovely Book was followed by a sticker book titled Stampy Cat: Stick with Stampy! and released on 28 July 2016.

In October 2018, Garrett announced he would be taking a break from his Minecraft content to spend more time writing books. He returned briefly in 2019, with the release of episode 658 of Stampy's Lovely World, "Mirror World". The series returned to a weekly upload schedule on 19 August 2020. On 21 October 2023, Garrett released the final episode of Stampy's Lovely World, titled "Thanks For Watching". The video marked the end of the 823-episode series, and it received 1.7 million views in a day. Garrett stated that although his personal channels would be inactive following the series' conclusion, he would continue working on his podcast The Bonus Points. The Bonus Points would continue to produce episodes until the end of 2025.

=== Other ventures ===
In 2018, Garrett broke a Guinness World Record for the fastest time to make and display ten cakes in Minecraft, which he did in three minutes and 51 seconds. In January 2024, Garrett was hired by 4J Studios to help develop a video game called Reforj, using their new proprietary voxel engine called Elements Engine.

== Content ==
His avatar is a character called Stampy Cat, an orange and white cat (depicted by a commercially available Minecraft skin based on the character Fidget from the video game Dust: An Elysian Tail). Garrett describes the character as "a bigger, brighter, better version" of himself. Other characters in the videos (who are referred to as Stampy's "helpers") include iBallisticSquid, the YouTube name of Garrett's friend David Spencer, and Sqaishey Quack, a duck character played by Garrett's former spouse Kye Bates. When Garrett started making content about Minecraft, which 'blew up', he noticed that his audience mostly consisted of children. Upon this realisation, he began to make his content more family-oriented. Garrett's Minecraft series adds a story to a game which has none, while giving viewers ideas for activities to pursue with their friends in their own Minecraft games.

Once Garrett became aware of his young audience, he started placing more energy into his voice to keep their attention. This voice is high-pitched, and has a 'trademark laughter', which The Independent described as a "helium honk". Caroline Knorr of Common Sense Media describes Stampy's presentation as best for younger children, and that "Stampy feels like a cross between Pee-wee Herman and Mr. Rogers". Lee Bear was a bear character who was prominent in the earlier Stampy's Lovely World episodes as a helper, played by the Minecraft YouTuber Lee Carson. In 2015, it was alleged that Carson sent threatening messages and explicit images of himself to women online. Garrett removed Carson from the series in September 2015, doing so in a manner that concealed the truth of Carson's actions from Garrett's young fanbase.

=== Viewership ===
In February 2014, the Stampylonghead channel received 159.3 million views. At the time, he had 2.3 million subscribers and 845 million channel views overall. In March 2014, Garrett was in the top 10 most-viewed YouTube channels worldwide. That year, his audience consisted largely of 6 to 14-year-olds, about 60% of whom were girls. In May 2015, he was the 32nd most-viewed YouTube channel of all time, with 3.5 billion views and 5.8 million subscribers. His YouTube channel surpassed 10 million subscribers on 8 February 2021.

== Personal life ==
Garrett has described himself as being shy and "a very big introvert". On 28 July 2019, Garrett married Kye Bates, a fellow Minecraft YouTuber known online as Sqaishey Quack. They have a cat named Ori, and two dogs named Alyx and Mei. On 29 January 2025, Bates announced that the two had ended their relationship the previous autumn.

== Bibliography ==
- Stampy's Lovely Book (Egmont, 2015), ISBN 978-1405281560
- Stampy Cat: Stick with Stampy! (Egmont, 2016), ISBN 978-1405284219

== Filmography ==
=== Television ===
Year	Title	Role	Notes	Ref.
2014	BBC Breakfast	Himself	Guest star, "7 March 2014"	
2015	Good Morning Britain	Himself	Guest star, "Episode #2.73"	
2016	Diddy TV	Himself	Guest star for episodes three, seven and fourteen	
2017	BBC Breakfast	Himself	Guest star, "13 September 2017"	

=== Web ===
Year	Title	Role	Notes	Ref.
2012–2023	Stampy's Lovely World	Stampy Cat	Creator	
2014	Meet Me at the Reck	Stampy Cat	Guest star, "Cat in Black Ft. Stampylonghead & Jack Black"	
2015	Good Mythical Morning	Himself	Guest star, "Ultimate Minecraft Quiz ft. StampyCat"	
2015	Good Mythical MORE	Himself	Guest star, "Corn Dogs With Stampycat"	
2015	Gamer's Guide to Pretty Much Everything	Stampy Cat	Guest star, episode one	
2015–2016	Wonder Quest	Stampy Cat	Creator and writer	
2015–2016	I Wonder	Stampy Cat	Creator	

=== Video games ===
Year	Title	Role	Notes	Ref.
2016–2017	Minecraft: Story Mode	Stampy Cat	In episodes "A Portal to Mystery", "Hero in Residence" and "Giant Consequences"	
TBA	Reforj	N/A	Game designer	

== Awards and nominations ==
Year	Award	Category	Result	Ref.
2014	The Game Awards	Trending Gamer	Nominated	
2014	4th Annual Streamy Awards	Gaming	Nominated	
2015	2015 Kids' Choice Awards	UK Favourite Tipster	Nominated	
2015	5th Annual Streamy Awards	Gaming	Nominated	
2016	2016 Kids' Choice Awards	UK Favourite Tipster	Nominated	
