= Sarah Elmaleh =

American voice actor

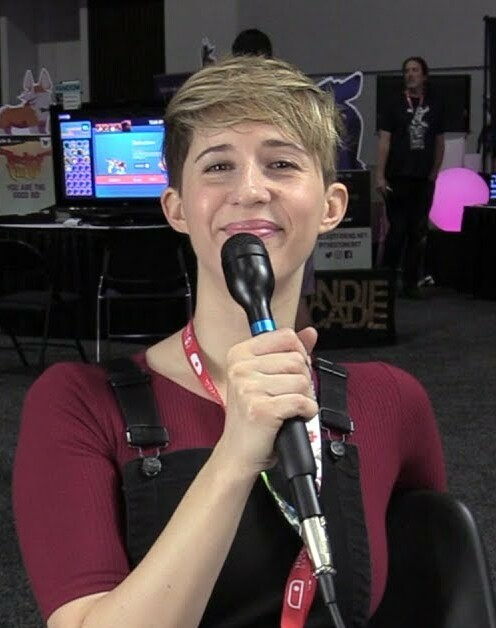
- Elmaleh in 2019
- Born: Sarah Horn Elmaleh
- Occupation: Voice actor

Sarah Horn Elmaleh is an American voice actor. She is known for her work in the indie video games Gone Home (2013) and Where the Water Tastes Like Wine (2018) and AAA titles such as Final Fantasy XV (2016), For Honor (2017), Gears 5, and Anthem (both 2019). Elmaleh became involved with the SAG-AFTRA union after she moved from New York City to Los Angeles in 2015. In 2019, she founded the multilingual, online games conference gamedev.world with game developer Rami Ismail.

== Early life ==
Sarah Horn Elmaleh practiced dancing from the age of three until she was fourteen, when an injury led her to become involved in theater in high school. She attended Wesleyan University, located in Middletown, Connecticut, where she performed in radio dramas, which she felt drew on her childhood experiences of playing video games, especially adventure games by LucasArts and games by BioWare. She graduated in 2007.

== Career ==
Elmaleh performed in theater in New York for a few years after she graduated from university and found that auditions for voice-over roles were "less stressful and more fun, more playful, more casual" than other types of auditions. She also worked at Kill Screen magazine. Her credits for video game voice work go back to 2011. After she moved from Brooklyn to Los Angeles in 2015 to voice AAA video games, she became involved with union organizing in the video game industry. Elmaleh became more involved with AAA games after obtaining a talent agent in California with the help of referral by Jennifer Hale, known for her voice work in the Mass Effect series. Elmaleh has since acted in voice roles in the indie video games Gone Home (2013) and Where the Water Tastes Like Wine (2018), and the AAA titles Final Fantasy XV (2016) and For Honor (2017).

Elmaleh provided the voice of the female player character in BioWare's 2019 video game Anthem. A review by the National Post praised the game's acting, among other features, singling out Elmaleh's performance as "instantly likeable, infusing our hero with roguishness, confidence, friendliness and authentic wit." Before she was hired to work on the game, she provided the voices for characters in a mod of the BioWare-produced game Dragon Age: Origins. After allegations of Anthem's protracted development timeline were reported after the game's release, in early 2019, Elmaleh spoke to Variety on the game's development and her favorable personal experiences during the process; she also said she was recording lines for a planned update to the game.

=== Union activities ===
As a member of the labor union SAG-AFTRA, in 2015, Elmaleh voted in favor of strike action by video game voice actors against eleven video game developers and publishers to receive compensation through residuals in addition to other requests on working conditions. She participated in the strike, which began in October 2016, following failed contract negotiations with publishers through the previous year, and lasted until 2017. In late October 2018, the union released a contract which addressed the issues of compensation and working conditions for unionized voice actors, motion-capture performers, and singers, and also provided a way for actors to work on small game productions under the union. The agreement was developed through a two-year process led by voice actors including Elmaleh, Crispin Freeman, Jennifer Hale, and Courtenay Taylor. Elmaleh told Gamasutra at the time: "The only apprehension I had in joining the union was missing out on this whole burgeoning space of ambitious artistic expression. Coming out of indies and loving them, and not wanting to lose them as I scale up." Elmaleh voice acted under the new contract in the 2018 titles Where the Water Tastes Like Wine by Good Shepherd Entertainment and Exapunks by Zachtronics.

In 2018, Elmaleh, Jennifer Hale, and Cissy Jones created Specialized Workshops And Actor Tactics (SWAAT), a free service to improve video game scripts held with the Los Angeles-based company The Halp Network. Although actors involved with SWAAT were members of the SAG-AFTRA union, SWAAT did not require the game developer's project be under the union.

Elmaleh was chair of SAG-AFTRA's Interactive Media bargaining unit when the union voted in September 2023 to authorize a possible strike against video game companies, amid a strike by SAG-AFTRA's film and television actors alongside one by the Writers Guild of America. Elmaleh and fellow bargaining unit member Zeke Alton said they were interested in securing workplace measures that were, according to Polygon, "standard elsewhere in Hollywood — five-minute breaks per hour, for instance." In 2024, after SAG-AFTRA made an agreement with Replica Studios to allow union members to manage a digitally replicated version of their voices generated by artificial intelligence (AI) techniques, Elmaleh stated she had "always been one of the more conservative voices" on the topic of AI voice clones, but now felt more "agnostic".

=== gamedev.world ===
Elmaleh previously worked "game-maker relations" for the IndieCade games festival, a position in which she says she acted as the "single bottleneck" between the festival and participating game developers. She recalled meeting a game developer at her job who struggled to communicate with her in English, which motivated her to meet game developer Rami Ismail after reading a blog post by Ismail on language barriers in the video game industry. Ismail and Elmaleh eventually organized the online, multilingual games conference gamedev.world in 2019, supported by an advisory board made from Gwen Frey, Houssem Ben Amor and Gabriel Dal Santo, in order to "diversify" the video game industry. The conference features a series of presentations by developers broadcast with closed captioning and translations in eight languages. It followed an initial showcase of the format organized by Ismail and Elmaleh for the 2015 Games for Change Festival held in New York City.

== Personal life ==
On her personal website, Elmaleh states she is bisexual and gender-expansive and that her ethnicity is a combination of "English, German, French, Irish and French-Canadian, as well as 1/4 Moroccan (Sephardic Jewish) and 1/8 Japanese (yonsei)." Her father, Antonio Osato Elmaleh (1950–2020), was an investor and former restaurateur and film producer. Her mother (d. 2013) worked for American Airlines as a flight attendant.

== Voice-over filmography ==
List of voice performances in video games
Year	Title	Role	Notes	Source
2012	Resonance	Anna Castellanos		
2013	Skulls of the Shogun			
2013	Gone Home	Katie Greenbriar		
2013	Codename Cygnus			
2014	Children of Liberty	Ally		
2015	Gravity Ghost			
2015	Galak-Z: The Dimensional			
2015	2064: Read Only Memories			
2015	Call of Duty: Black Ops III			
2016	Final Fantasy XV			
2017	For Honor	The Raider		
2017	Pyre			
2018	Where the Water Tastes Like Wine	Rose		
2018	Call of Duty: Black Ops 4			
2018	Exapunks			
2019	Anthem	Female Player		
2019	Gears 5	Lizzie Carmine		
2019	Afterparty	Apollyon		
2020	Spider-Man: Miles Morales			
2020	Star Wars: Squadrons	Specialist A (Imperial pilot)		
2021	Halo Infinite			
2021	Fortnite	Cube Queen		
2023	Hi-Fi Rush	Korsica		
