= Astra Logical =

American video game publisher

- Company type: Private
- Industry: Video games
- Predecessor: Astra Fund
- Founded: 2024
- Headquarters: Torrance, California
- Services: Video game publishing
- Website: astralogical.org

Astra Logical is a video game publisher that specializes in indie puzzle and strategy games.

== History ==
Originally announced in 2022 as a philanthropic fund named Astra Fund, it re-launched as a mission-driven for-profit publisher in 2024 under managing director Heather Jackson. In 2025, Astra published Kaizen: A Factory Story, the first game made by Zach Barth's new studio Coincidence after Zachtronics was dissolved.

== Games funded as Astra Fund ==
Year	Title	Platform(s)	Developer
2023	Puzzmo	Web browser	Zach Gage, Orta Therox
2023	Rytmos	Windows, macOS, Switch	Floppy Club
2024	Arranger: A Role-Puzzling Adventure	Windows, macOS, PS5, Switch, iOS, Android	Furniture & Mattress
2024	Paper Trail	Windows, macOS, PS4, PS5, Xbox One, Xbox Series X/S, iOS, Android	Newfangled Games
2024	Star Stuff	Windows, macOS	Ánimo Games Studio
TBA	Schrodinger's Cat Burglar	Windows	Abandoned Sheep

== Games published as Astra Logical ==
Year	Title	Platform(s)	Developer	Ref.
2023	Snakebird Complete	Windows, macOS, Switch	Noumenon Games	
2024	Rebots	Windows	FlatPonies	
2024	Star Stuff	Windows, macOS	Ánimo Games Studio	
2025	Castle Craft	Windows	Twin Earth	
2025	Dawn Apart	Windows	Industrial Technology and Witchcraft	
2025	Dawnfolk	Windows, Linux, macOS	Darenn Keller	
2025	Kaizen: A Factory Story	Windows, Linux, macOS	Coincidence	
2025	Modulus	Windows	Happy Volcano	
2025	Nebuchadnezzar (Note: Nebuchadnezzar was initially released in 2021. In 2025, Nepos Games entered into a partnership with Astra Logical to further promote and support the game.)	Windows, Linux	Nepos Games	
TBA	Recur	Windows	kaleidoscube	
TBA	SkyRig	Windows	Rocket Flair Studios	
