= Fages =

Fages may refer to:

- Pedro Fages (1734–1794), Spanish soldier and explorer
- Pascal Fages, French rugby player
- Carles Fages de Climent (1902–1968) Spanish writer, poet and journalist

== See also ==
- Fage (disambiguation)
- Phage (disambiguation)
