= Phage (disambiguation) =

Phage is the shortened form of bacteriophage, a virus that infects bacteria.

Phage may also refer to:

- "Phage" (Star Trek: Voyager), an episode of Star Trek: Voyager
- Phage (comics), a supervillain from the Spider-Man comic books
- Phages (EP), an EP by the Most Serene Republic
- Phages, fictional monsters in Shadow Galactica group of characters in Sailor Moon
- Phages, fictional genetically-engineered humans in Dances on the Snow
- The Phage, a fictional disease in Exapunks

== See also ==
- Fage (disambiguation)
- Macrophage, a large phagocyte that originates from a monocyte
- Page (disambiguation)
- Phagocyte, a cell that ingests foreign cells, viruses, and debris
