= Infiniminer =

2009 video game

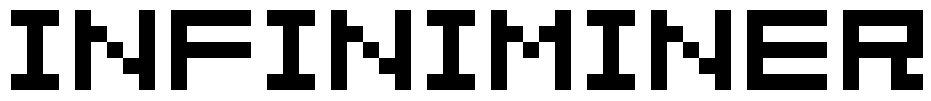
- Developer: Zachtronics Industries
- Publisher: Zachtronics Industries
- Engine: Microsoft XNA
- Platform: Windows
- Release: April 29, 2009
- Genre: Strategy; Sandbox
- Mode: Multiplayer
- License: MIT

Infiniminer is an open-source multiplayer sandbox game developed by Zachtronics, centered on voxel-based construction and excavation. Players assume the role of miners on a team, aiming to collect the highest amount of money by mining ore while avoiding and fighting the opposing team. According to its creator, Zachary Barth, the game was built on the engine of Infinifrag 2, and inspired by Team Fortress 2 and Motherload by XGen Studios. The game has been cited as an influence on the development of Minecraft.

== Gameplay ==
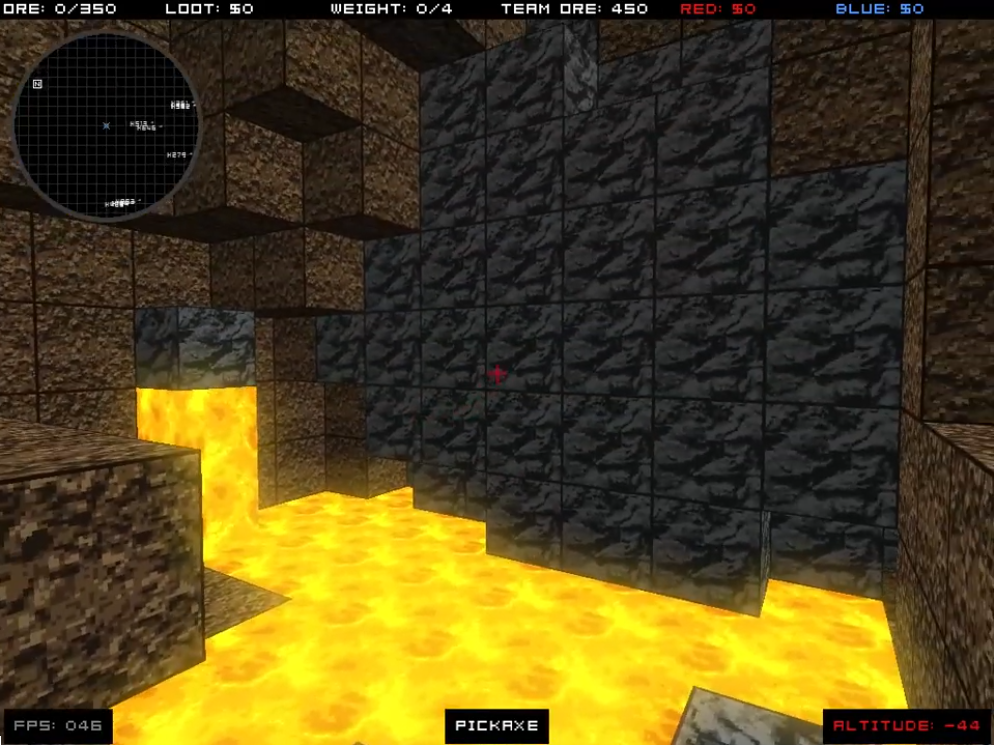
A lava-filled cave in Infiniminer

Players are placed into teams within a procedurally generated landscape and are equipped with mining tools. The primary objective is to collect the most money by mining ore while avoiding or fighting an opposing team. The team that earns the most money by the end of the round is declared the winner. During development, Zachary Barth, the creator of Infiniminer, observed that players began using its mechanics for building and item collection, deviating from its original competitive design. This behavior led to the emergence of sandbox-style gameplay.

== Development ==
Zachary Barth had early experience with programming games in his youth but honed his skills more formally while attending Rensselaer Polytechnic Institute in New York. After graduating, he worked as a game programmer at Microsoft, continuing independent development in his spare time. In April 2009, he released Infiniminer, a multiplayer game that initially focused on competitive mining objectives. However, players soon began using its sandbox mechanics to construct structures.

Despite the game's growing popularity, Infiniminer generated no revenue. Barth had not obfuscated the game's source code, which led to it being decompiled and spread online. As a result, unauthorized modifications and hacks became common. Due to the lack of monetization and control over the game's code, Barth open sourced the game and discontinued development.

== Legacy ==
In May 2009, Swedish indie developer Markus Persson began early development on the project that would eventually become Minecraft, initially titled Cave Game. Infiniminer significantly influenced the project, particularly in its block-based visual style, first-person perspective, and building mechanics. However, Persson aimed to incorporate additional gameplay elements, such as role-playing features, to distinguish his game from its predecessor.

Following the rise in popularity of Minecraft, Barth reflected on the game's impact in an interview with Cascade PBS. He stated, "It was never my plan to have what happened, happen. You don't plan things in life." Although initially shocked by Minecraft's success, Barth acknowledged the game's popularity. Barth later found commercial success with the release of SpaceChem, a puzzle game that grossed over US$1 million on a development budget of just US$4,000. The game's financial success enabled him to leave his position at Microsoft and establish his own studio, Zachtronics, which eventually employed four people. By 2012, however, the studio faced financial difficulties and turned to contract work with the education company Amplify to develop educational games.

On 15 March 2014, Infiniminer was featured on the British television program Fresh Meat. According to Barth, a Channel 4 production coordinator informed him of the inclusion. He initially assumed the reference was to Minecraft due to its broader popularity, but the episode featured footage and references from Infiniminer.

In 2015, Barth released Infinifactory, a puzzle game incorporating elements of both Infiniminer and SpaceChem.
