= Kaizen: A Factory Story =

- Developer: Coincidence
- Publisher: Astra Logical
- Platforms: Windows; Linux; macOS
- Release: July 14, 2025
- Genre: Puzzle
- Mode: Single-player

Kaizen: A Factory Story is an automation puzzle video game developed by Coincidence, a studio formed by Zach Barth after the closure of Zachtronics, and published by Astra Logical. It was released for Windows, Linux and macOS in July 2025.

The player takes the role of an American engineer in the 1980s during the Japanese asset price bubble, hired by a Japanese company to help create assembly systems for a variety of electronic items. Like Barth's previous games, Kaizen gives the player open-ended sets of tools and commands to create these assemblies, with the player then rated on global scoreboards based on how efficient their solution is based on certain criteria.

== Gameplay ==
In this level, a camcorder has to be built.

Within Kaizen, the player takes the role of an American engineer hired by a Japanese manufacturing company in the 1980s to help design assembly processes for various products. The game's narrative follows as the engineer becomes accustomed to the Japanese approach to manufacturing, with the story progressing as the player finishes each assembly design.

Within each puzzle level, the player is given a set of manipulators, such as arms that can push, pull, or rotate parts, or devices that establish connections between parts. The goal is to program these manipulators and controls as to correctly assemble a final product from several subcomponents. The game uses a visual programming language along a timeline so that the player can coordinate the actions of these manipulators and controls. When the player's assembly has successfully built a number of the desired product correctly, they complete that level and move onto the next level; they are shown how efficient their assembly is based on several metrics and how these compare to others using global scoreboards.

Like most of Barth's past games, there is an added solitaire mini-game, with the one in Kaizen based on a solitaire and pachinko mashup.

== Development ==
Following the release of Last Call BBS in mid-2022, Zach Barth, the founder of Zachtronics, announced that he was shutting down Zachtronics, saying "We felt it was time for a change. This might sound weird, but while we got very good at making ‘Zachtronics games’ over the last twelve years, it was hard for us to make anything else." By 2025, Barth had formed much of the same team of Zachtronics under a new studio called Coincidence, which Barth called a "flexible business framework". Before announcing Kaizen, the studio had already published two physical card games, as well as an edutainment game, Add Astra, that was released in 2024. Coincidence announced Kaizen in March 2025.

Barth said that their approach with Kaizen was to make their previous style of games from Zachtronics to be more approachable from a broader audience. The item-creating gameplay of previous Zachtronics games was refined to help players review what exactly went wrong with their assemblies, and how to improve them.

Barth had wanted to set a game during the Japanese electronic boom of the late 1980s, since a number of key products still remembered in the present were created during that period. Matthew Burns, writer and producer for Coincidence and who is half Japanese, wanted to create a main character with American-Japanese nationality to address anti-Japanese sentiment in the United States during that time. Burns claims that works like 1993's Rising Sun played to misconceptions of how the Japanese had become so efficient, and based most of Kaizen's narrative on research from a book, Inventing Japan, that documents the continuous improvement that Japan utilized after the end of World War II; the game's title Kaizen derives from the Japanese term for this practice.
