= Shenzhen I/O =

2016 puzzle video game

- Developer: Zachtronics
- Publisher: Zachtronics
- Designer: Zach Barth
- Artist: Matthew Seiji Burns
- Platforms: Windows, Linux, macOS
- Release: November 17, 2016
- Genres: Puzzle, programming
- Mode: Single-player

Shenzhen I/O is a puzzle video game and programming game developed by Zachtronics for Microsoft Windows, Linux, and macOS-based personal computers. The game was released in November 2016.

== Gameplay ==
Shenzhen I/O is a puzzle video game set in the near future in which players assume the role of an electronics engineer who has immigrated to Shenzhen, China to work for fictional technology company Shenzhen Longteng Electronics. The player is tasked with creating products for clients, which involves constructing circuits and then writing code to run them. The programming language used in the game is similar to assembly language and the circuit elements resemble simplified versions of real-world electronics.

The game allows players to create their own challenges by writing Lua scripts.

== Development and release ==
Shenzhen I/O was developed by Zachtronics. The game is seen as a spiritual successor to their previous title TIS-100, a coding puzzle game released in 2015. Shenzhen I/O was designed with the same niche audience in mind, specifically people interested in programming. The idea of using the city of Shenzhen, which is a major electronics and high technology manufacturing center in China, as the setting came from Barth reading blogs from Andrew "bunnie" Huang about his experiences there.

The game features a more approachable user interface than TIS-100 and a cast of characters. Zachtronics was reluctant to include a tutorial to teach players how to play Shenzhen I/O. Instead they opted to include a dense manual containing helpful information. Narrative elements are woven into the manual and gameplay by tasking the player to create fictional products.

Zachtronics announced Shenzhen I/O in September 2016, and released an in-development version of the game via Steam Early Access in October 2016. The game launched out of early access for Linux, macOS, and Windows on November 17, 2016. The release was at the conclusion of about six months of development work.

From players' feedback, Zachtronics also released Shenzhen Solitaire, a mini-game within Shenzhen I/O, as a separate, standalone title on December 16, 2016.

== Reception ==
Shenzhen I/O was received favourably by Rock, Paper, Shotgun writer Brendan Caldwell.

Although Shenzhen I/O has a higher price tag than its predecessor TIS-100, Zachtronics observed that the game was selling faster during its early access period.

The game was nominated for "Excellence in Design" at the Independent Games Festival Competition Awards.
