= Snakebird (video game) =

2015 puzzle video game

- Developer: Noumenon Games
- Publisher: Noumenon Games
- Platforms: Linux; macOS; Windows; Android; iOS
- Release: Linux, macOS, Windows; 4 May 2015; Android, iOS; 21 July 2016
- Genre: Puzzle

Snakebird is a 2015 puzzle video game developed by Swedish studio Noumenon Games. The player controls one or more "snakebirds" which move around a grid and collect fruit prior to reaching the goal. Versions have been released for PC, mobile platforms, and Nintendo Switch. The sequels Snakebird Primer and Snakebird Complete were released in 2019 and 2023, respectively.

Snakebird received positive reviews from critics, who described the game as very challenging. It has been cited as an influence for later games including the 2019 game Baba Is You.

== Gameplay ==
In each of the game's 53 levels, the player controls one or more characters, known as "snakebirds". Each is a combination of a snake and a bird, but cannot fly. The gameplay consists of moving the snakebirds around a 2D grid, with movement similar to Snake games, except with gravity along the y-axis. The objective of each level is to maneuver the snakebirds to a goal while collecting fruit that increases the length of the snakebirds. The challenge lies in finding the particular movements required to control the snakebirds in such a way that builds towards reaching the goal.

== Development ==
Snakebird development began in March 2013. Development of a prototype continued for the Ludum Dare 27 game competition in August 2013, but the game was not submitted to the competition. The game was released for PC on May 4, 2015. It was later released on mobile platforms in 2016.

== Sequels ==
Snakebird Primer
- Developer: Noumenon Games
- Publisher: Noumenon Games
- Platforms: Windows; Linux; macOS; Android; iOS
- Release: Android, iOS; 18 February 2019; Windows, Linux, macOS; 20 February 2019
- Genre: Puzzle

Snakebird Primer was released on 20 February 2019. The sequel contains 70 levels, and is regarded as having been made substantially easier than the original to appeal to a wider audience.

Snakebird Complete
- Developer: Noumenon Games
- Publisher: Astra Logical
- Platforms: Nintendo Switch; Windows; macOS
- Release: Nintendo Switch; 24 November 2023; Windows, macOS; 29 December 2023
- Genre: Puzzle

Snakebird Complete, which contains all the levels from Snakebird and Snakebird Primer, was released for the Nintendo Switch on 24 November 2023, and for PC and Mac on 29 December 2023.

== Reception ==
Snakebird received positive reviews, with critics citing its visual design, describing it as "cute" while contrasting that aspect with its difficulty. Kotaku described the game as a "wolf in sheep's clothing", and Pocket Gamer called it "the Dark Souls of puzzle games". Touch Arcade rated Snakebird's iOS release five out of five stars, praising its visual design, animations, backgrounds, and mobile device controls. On its difficulty, they described it as "tough" and stated that it was not for everyone. Eurogamer praised Snakebird Complete for its level design, the conciseness and trickiness of its puzzles, and its nonlinear level selection map.

In 2019, Baba is You developer Arvi Teikari described Snakebird as "probably the singular title that has most affected Baba Is You's design".

== Other mentions ==
A team of researchers in 2020 found that small changes on the game levels can have a large impact on the length of a solution.

== See also ==
- List of puzzle video games
- Snake (video game genre)
