= Nebuchadnezzar (video game) =

2021 video game

- Steam header
- Developer: Nepos Games
- Publishers: Nepos Games; Astra Logical
- Platforms: Windows, Linux
- Release: February 17, 2021
- Genre: City-building
- Mode: Single-player

Nebuchadnezzar is a city-building game developed and published by Nepos Games for Windows and Linux on December 3, 2020. The game takes place in Ancient Mesopotamia. The game has been compared to Impressions Games' City Building series, especially the fourth entry, Pharaoh.

== Gameplay ==
The game's campaign tasks the player with building some of the cities in ancient Mesopotamia like Ur, Nineveh and Babylon.

== Release ==
Nebuchadnezzar was announced on November 2, 2019, for release in 2020. On November 19, 2020, the game was delayed to February 17, 2021. A DLC campaign, The Adventures of Sargon, was released on February 7, 2023. In 2025, Nepos Games entered into a partnership with Astra Logical to further promote and support the game.

== Reception ==
Reception

Aggregate score
| Aggregator | Score |
|---|---|
| Metacritic | 73/100 |

Review scores
| Publication | Score |
|---|---|
| 4Players | 80/100 |
| GameStar | 70/100 |
| PC Gamer (US) | 64/100 |
| PC Games (DE) | 7/10 |
| CD-Action | 7/10 |
| Gamepressure | 7/10 |
| Vortex | 8/10 |

Nebuchadnezzar received "mixed or average" reviews according to review aggregator Metacritic.

PC Gamer summarized: "Nebuchadnezzar isn't lacking for class, but needs to dial up the fun factor." Rock Paper Shotgun criticized the lack of content: "There are temples, but there's no religion. There's no entertainment. No war. No disease. No taxes, even." Eurogamer praised the historical accuracy but described the campaign missions as repetitive.

At the 2021 Czech Game of the Year Awards, Nebuchadnezzar won the Best Technological Solution award.
