= Last Call BBS =

2022 video game

- Developer(s): Zachtronics
- Publisher(s): Zachtronics
- Platform(s): Microsoft Windows; MacOS
- Release: August 4, 2022
- Genre(s): Puzzle
- Mode(s): Single-player

Last Call BBS is a puzzle video game developed by Zachtronics. Released on August 4, 2022, it was the studio's final game before its closure.

== Gameplay ==
Set on a Z5 Powerlance, a fictional 1990s PC, Last Call BBS features eight small puzzle games with distinct gameplay. To install the games, the player needs to dial an in-game BBS. All games contain elements of previous works developed by Zachtronics. For instance, 20th Century Food Court, a factory simulation game where the player arranges machines to make food, incorporates the assembly line elements of SpaceChem. With point-and-click controls, the games begin with easy introductory levels, before increasing in difficulty as new gameplay elements are introduced. In addition to the puzzle games, the game contains a circuit creation game, model-building simulator and a retro-style minigame of solitaire, similar to those present in previous Zachtronics games.

== Development and release ==
The closure of Zachtronics was announced in June 2022, along with the announcements of Last Call BBS and a compilation of all solitaire minigames in the studio's previous works. Last Call BBS' official trailer was released online later that month. The game was released on Steam via early access on July 5, and its final version was released on August 4. In an interview with Kotaku, Zach Barth, Zachtronics' founder and lead designer, said that the reason for their breakup was that they "felt it was time for a change." The team officially disbanded following the release of The Zachtronics Solitaire Collection, though some of its members, including Barth, are still active in game development. Last Call BBS received favorable reviews from critics upon release.
