= Möbius Front '83 =

2020 video game

- Developer: Zachtronics
- Publisher: Zachtronics
- Platforms: Microsoft Windows, Linux, macOS
- Release: WW: November 5, 2020
- Genre: Computer wargame
- Modes: Single-player, multiplayer

Möbius Front '83 is a computer wargame developed and published by Zachtronics. It was released in November 2020.

== Gameplay ==
In 1983, the United States is invaded by an alternate dimension version of itself. Players initially control the defenders, though they can play as the aggressor once they complete the single-player campaign. In multiplayer games, another player can control the Soviet Army. It is turn-based and uses a hex grid, as in tabletop tactical wargames. Units do not have variable action points, but most units must choose between moving and attacking.

== Development ==
The game was inspired by US military manuals. It was released November 5, 2020, and multiplayer was added in January 2021.

== Reception ==
Reception

Review score
Publication	Score
PC Gamer (US)	74/100

Tom Hatfield of PC Gamer wrote that Möbius Front '83 is accessible and makes wargames easy to understand, but it lacks exciting battles. Joe Robinson of PCGamesN wrote, "Competent and challenging but not especially deep, this Cold War tactical romp also tends to get a bit dry and repetitive at times."
