= Eliza (video game) =

2019 visual novel by Zachtronics

- Developer: Zachtronics
- Publisher: Zachtronics
- Producer: Matthew Seiji Burns
- Platforms: Windows, macOS, Linux, Nintendo Switch
- Release: Windows, macOS, Linux; August 12, 2019; Nintendo Switch; October 10, 2019
- Genre: Visual novel
- Mode: Single player

Eliza is a visual novel game developed by Zachtronics, released on Windows, macOS, and Linux on August 12, 2019, with a Nintendo Switch version on October 10, 2019.

== Gameplay ==
Eliza is a visual novel. The player takes the role of Evelyn, a young woman who was initially successful in the high-tech industry of Seattle before burning out, and was mostly disconnected from life for about three years. In the present, she serves as the human proxy for Eliza, a virtual counselling program named after the real-life ELIZA, one of the earliest attempts at artificial intelligence in the 1960s. Evelyn reads off what the program produces to tell the clients. Evelyn is required to stay on script produced by Eliza, but this creates difficult choices for her in how she talks to the clients and to others including old friends. Later, Evelyn is given the opportunity to read "off-script", creating scenarios that may affect herself directly. The player has the ability to choose how Evelyn behaves in some cases, affecting how the story progresses. After finishing the game, the player can go back to previous chapters and make different decisions to see how this affects the various endings.

Like most of Zachtronics' recent games, the game also includes a variation of a solitaire game with kabufuda cards should the player need to take their mind off the game.

== Development ==
Unlike most of Zachtronics' other games, where founder Zach Barth has led development, Eliza's production was led by Matthew Seiji Burns (Matt Burns), who had joined Zachtronics as writer and music composer. Prior to joining Zachtronics, Burns had worked at Treyarch and 343 Industries, and had gone through a "crunch culture" there that he felt himself burning out, and thus joined with the smaller Zachtronics.

With the studio between titles, Burns had been inspired to develop a game about burnout to reflect his own experiences. He recalled a demo for SimSensei and MultiSense, a DARPA project at the University of Southern California that was a virtual therapist to be used for soldiers returning from overseas to see if they have symptoms of PTSD, the program asking the soldiers questions though a computer-generated avatar and monitoring their facial and body responses. He found the demo "unsettling" as it "was just so strange to see this computer analyzing someone with such a human problem" and thought how that could apply to a larger scale. Burns was also inspired by other wellness mobile apps such as BetterHelp that had similar virtual counselling. Many of these apps were based on the simplicity of ELIZA, one of the first natural language processing demonstrations developed in the 1960s to simulate a virtual therapist; Eliza was named in honor of this program. Burns also considered how many of these virtual wellness apps collected users' private data to use for seemingly unknown purposes or sharing with other companies without users' knowledge, drawing this into the story within Eliza.

Burns was initially planning on developing the game himself, but after talking on his ideas with Barth, was convinced to let it be developed as a Zachtronics title. While vastly different in gameplay from Zachtronics' usual style of games, Barth considered the story that Burns has come up with to be on theme with other Zachtronics games. As both Barth and Burns have lived in the Seattle area for years, they opted to use Seattle as the setting for the game. Burns felt that Seattle was a high-technology driven city, both by Microsoft and Amazon.com, but has gone through several boom-and-bust cycles reflecting the burnout exhibited in the game.

Eliza was announced a couple of days before its release on August 12, 2019, on Microsoft Windows, macOS, and Linux. A version for the Nintendo Switch followed suit on October 10, 2019.

== Reception ==
Reception

Aggregate score
Aggregator	Score
Metacritic	PC: 85/100

Review scores
Publication	Score
4Players	PC: 84%
USgamer	PC: 4/5

Eliza received "generally favorable" reviews according to review aggregator Metacritic.

=== Accolades ===
The game was nominated for "Best Storytelling" at the 2019 Golden Joystick Awards, and for the Seumas McNally Grand Prize and Excellence in Narrative at the Independent Games Festival Awards.
