= Fage (disambiguation) =

Fage is a Greek dairy company and one of the major dairy brands in the country.

Fage of FAGE may also refer to:

== Places ==
- Fage, Albania, a village in Tirana municipality, Tirana County, Albania
- La Fage-Montivernoux, a commune in the Lozère department in southern France
- La Fage-Saint-Julien, a commune in the Lozère department in southern France
- Saint-Pierre-de-la-Fage, a commune in the Hérault department in southern France

== Other uses ==
- Fédération de l'Administration Générale de l'État, a French trade union

== People with the surname ==
- Antoinette Fage (1824–1883), French Catholic nun
- Ernie Fage (1953–2026), Canadian politician
- John Fage (1921–2002), British historian of African history
- Louis Fage (1883–1964), French arachnologist

== See also ==
- Fages (disambiguation)
