= Infinifactory =

2015 video game

- Developer: Zachtronics
- Publisher: Zachtronics
- Designer: Zach Barth
- Composer: Matthew Burns
- Engine: Unity
- Platforms: Microsoft Windows, OS X, Linux, PlayStation 4
- Release: Linux, OS X, Windows; June 30, 2015; PlayStation 4; December 22, 2015
- Genre: Puzzle
- Mode: Single-player

Infinifactory is a puzzle video game developed and published by Zachtronics, initially released on Microsoft Windows, OS X, and Linux on June 30, 2015. The game was later released on PlayStation 4 in December 2015. In the game, the player takes the role of a human abducted by aliens and forced to construct assembly lines to create certain objects for apparently-nefarious purposes. The game combines elements of Zachtronics' previous SpaceChem and Infiniminer, with the assembly lines being built from blocks in a three-dimensional space.

== Gameplay ==
Infinifactory is a puzzle game, structured as several sets of puzzles based on various tasks. The player takes the role of a human that is abducted by an alien race and is put to work to help the aliens construct equipment; the character does not appear to be the first one that has been taken for this purpose as throughout the levels are the corpses of other abducted humans, which the player can find and listen to their last audio log. The game is divided into six worlds with several puzzles per world. Completing a specified quota of puzzles on a world lets the player advance to the next one, as well as advancing the story. By successfully completing all the puzzles, the player's character is rescued from the alien race by other abductees to a hidden base on the alien homeworld, and begins to work with the other abductees to find a way to escape the planet and return home. Additional chapters have since been added during the game's time in Early Access, adding in new block types and furthering the story of the abductees' escape attempts.

Within each puzzle, the player is tasked to deliver a number of objects, constructed from one or more types of cube, to one or more delivery points by directing and assembling the individual cubes from their spawning point. The player has an unlimited amount of time to set up the various components that make up the assembly line, including conveyor belts, welders to attach pieces to each other, and sensors to trigger devices like pushers. This construction process is similar to other block-building games like Minecraft, though there are no limits on the number of blocks that can be placed. The player's view is from a first-person perspective and can be freely moved about the puzzle's landscape, including vertically by using a jetpack. The player may also be constrained by pre-set objects that may help or hinder their assembly line construction and cannot be removed. The player can start the factory at any time, checking for faults and other issues should the process fail, including pausing the line to track down specific problems. Once the player has constructed an assembly line that successfully meets the delivery requirements, they can to move on to the next puzzle. The player's solution is scored on three criteria: footprint (the total floor space enclosed by the assembly line), cycles (the time taken between starting the assembly line and the requirements being met) and blocks (the number of non-platform type blocks used). The scores for each criterion are presented on a histogram of all players worldwide, encouraging the player to improve and optimize solutions to already-completed puzzles.

The game includes support for Steam Workshop, which allows users to create their own puzzle challenges to share with other players once they have completed the game's story mode. Players cannot submit a puzzle to the Workshop until they can build their own factory that successfully solves the puzzle, assuring that the puzzle is solvable.

== Development ==
Infinifactory is considered by Zachtronic's lead developer Zach Barth as a reworking of his first game, Manufactoid, in three dimensions. Though Barth did not feel this game was very good, it would help set up the mechanics of other games he developed, including the popular SpaceChem, which has the player developing manipulators to create chemical molecules. Barth wanted to develop a game that has the same flavor of mechanics of SpaceChem without making a direct sequel, and turned back to the original idea of Manufactoid to build on. Further, the game is based on the block mechanic approach that Barth had developed for his title Infiniminer, itself a basis for many other block-building games like Minecraft. The success of Minecraft led Barth to realize that basing a puzzle game on the block construction mechanics would make the game's fundamentals easy to grasp. Barth was also given suggestions by fans of his titles to return to the puzzle game genre after the release of his Ironclad Tactics.

A significant difference in Infinifactory compared other block-building games is the integration of supporting blocks to allow for blocks to fall when they are disconnected from other block structures. This was necessary to get the mechanics of the 3D conveyor belt system to work correctly and appropriately for their envisioned game.

The alien "language", which in-game appears as horizontal blocks of pixel-style glyphs, is a completely fake language that Barth created for the game. The glyphs were based on envisioning an idea of a 5x5 pixel block using visual rules that are common among other real pictorial alphabets, including the idea of punctuation, which he felt was appropriate for the alien race that built everything out of cubes. While Barth uses consistency in placing this glyphs into the game, using a limited font set he entitled Overlord, there was otherwise no intended meaning. Barth had run a small alternate reality game that demonstrated this glyph alphabet but intentionally without any meaning, so that players would be confused about the results.

The game's music was composed by Matthew Burns, who aimed to produce tracks using relatively low beats-per-minute that would work well as ambient music without putting additional pressure on the player as they worked through the puzzles.

The game was released to Steam Early Access on January 19, 2015. Barth was wary of an early-access release considering issues of other games released in that manner. Based on the development process they used for Ironclad Tactics—where after releasing the first final version of the game to the public, they found they needed to improve some parts of the game due to critical feedback—Barth planned to use early access to release a near-complete version of the title to the public. From there, they would use feedback to improve some of the gameplay mechanics and develop more puzzles and content for the title prior to a full final release, so that the product would appear complete. Barth likened this approach to a "living game", in which regardless of when the player buys the game, they will get one that is fully complete, but can help develop additional content and other improvements by buying in at the earlier stages. Barth considered his approach comparable to that used by Kerbal Space Program, Dwarf Fortress, and Minecraft. During early access, players were presented with a brief survey after each puzzle, asking for their thoughts on the level of difficulty and enjoyment; these responses were used to tune the puzzles that would be included with the final release of the game. The early-access period was also used to determine how far to develop the story elements of the game once the game's main engine was complete. Ironclad Tactics had a large amount of internal story, which took considerable time and effort to develop, and Barth found that players did not even respond to the story positively. As such, for Infinifactory, Barth opted for a more minimal story to release with Steam Early Access and used feedback to determine if more story needed to be added to the title. The game left early access and was fully released on June 30, 2015, and a PlayStation 4 version was released on December 22, 2015.

== Reception ==
Reception

Aggregate score
Aggregator	Score
Metacritic	(PS4) 70/100

Review scores
Publication	Score
Eurogamer	Recommended
PC Gamer (US)	93/100
Push Square	5/10

Infinifactory was well-received during its early access period. Commentators positively compared the game to SpaceChem, citing that the nature of Infinifactory being in three dimensions and the intuitive building approach that mimics games like Minecraft help to make the game more accessible. These commentators also noted the quality of the title even at its early access stage. Barth's approach for Infinifactory was stated to be a strong example of how to use early access effectively.

Infinifactory was nominated for the Excellence in Design award for the 2016 Independent Games Festival.
