= Opus Magnum =

2017 video game

- Developer: Zachtronics
- Publisher: Zachtronics
- Designers: Zach Barth; Keith Holman
- Programmers: Keith Holman; Zach Barth
- Artists: Kyle Steed; Jonathan Stroh; Steffani Charano
- Writer: Matthew Burns
- Composer: Matthew Burns
- Platforms: Windows, Linux, Mac, Nintendo Switch
- Release: December 8, 2017
- Genres: Puzzle, programming
- Mode: Single-player

Opus Magnum is a puzzle-based programming game developed by Zachtronics. It was released for Microsoft Windows, Linux, and Mac in December 2017, following about two months of early access. In the game, the player must assemble a series of machines using various tools and program them to complete alchemy-related tasks. The player can advance with any working solution to each problem, but is challenged through leaderboards to produce a machine that does the task in the shortest time, with the lowest cost of materials or the smallest occupied area. Opus Magnum is based on The Codex of Alchemical Engineering, one of the earliest Flash games made by Zach Barth prior to establishing Zachtronics.

== Gameplay ==
Opus Magnum has the player take the role of an alchemist to create required products by manipulating reagents, alchemical elements that resemble atoms. This features the use of an alchemical technology called the transmutation engine. The engine is represented as a hex grid which the player arranges various mechanisms and glyphs on. Mechanisms include arms that can grab, drop, rotate and pivot, with some being able to extend and retract, and tracks that the arms can travel on. Glyphs can bond and unbond elements, calcify basic elements into elemental salt, or project metals into their higher forms using quicksilver, even being able to turn lead into gold. Each item has a cost in G, though the player is not limited to a total cost, number of item, or space the solution uses in crafting their solution, save certain puzzles where there is a limited space in which the product must be made.

In addition to arranging mechanisms and glyphs, the player must provide each arm with instructions that take reagents from input spaces and assemble the product to be delivered to the output space. Arms each act under their own set of instructions, and run simultaneously once the program is started. The goal for most puzzles is to deliver a fixed number of products, thus testing the machine's operation over several cycles. Should the engine encounter an invalid scenario (collision between atoms, collision of an atom and an arm or two arms trying to move an atom in two different directions), the program will stop and require the player to readjust it.

Once the player has successfully delivered the desired products, they are ranked against other players based on three factors: speed in cycles, cost in G, and area in tiles. Players can combine these figures to create an unofficial statistic called sum. They can then attempt alternate solutions that optimize any of these statistics. Completed machines can be exported into an animated GIF to be shared on social media.

The game is structured through several chapters, providing the player with multiple puzzles they can work on and come back to as needed, though all puzzles within a chapter must be completed to progress to the next. The game includes Steam Workshop support to allow users to supply their own puzzles, given they have shown that a solution exists for the puzzle.

== Development ==
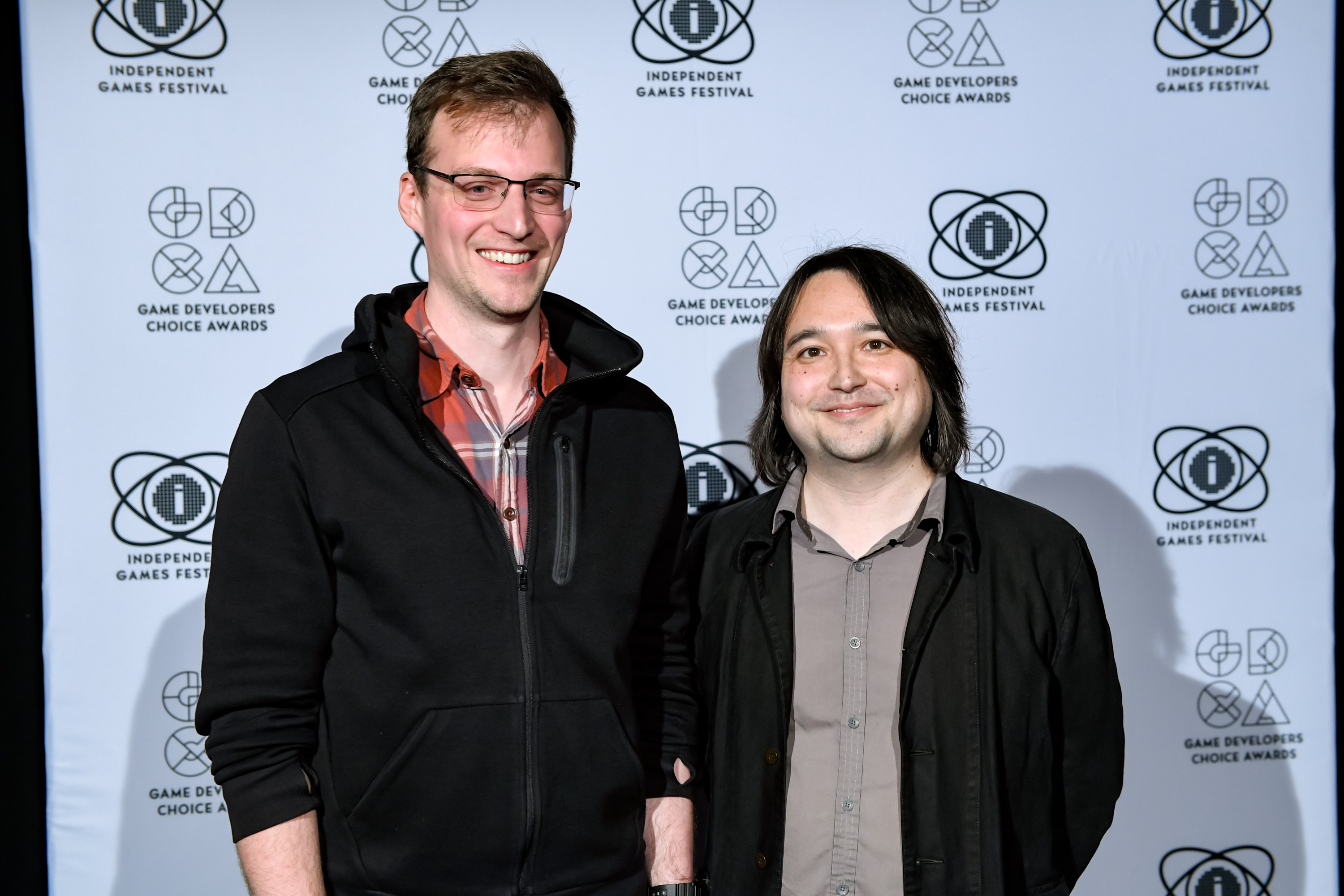
Zach Barth (left) and Matthew Burns, at the 2019 Game Developers Choice Awards

Zach Barth is the primary developer behind Zachtronics and has created a number of puzzle-driven programming games. Opus Magnum is a refined version of Barth's first game, The Codex of Alchemical Engineering, which was a 2008 browser game programmed in Adobe Flash. Codex was popular enough for Barth to create an expansion, also written in Flash, called Magnum Opus Challenge. While Barth led the programming effort, Matthew Burns wrote the game's dialog and composed its music. For Opus Magnum they wanted to create a narrative to motivate players to complete puzzles, but wanted to avoid the steampunk nature that seemed to be a clear fit for the game's mechanics.

One driving factor in developing Opus Magnum was ensuring players could make animated GIF images of their solutions to share. Barth had included the ability for players to record their solution for Infinifactory, a three-dimensional block-based game, but these images required viewers to have some spatial concept of how the solution was laid out. One user had produced a looping GIF of one of their factory solutions, which Barth and his team found strangely satisfying. This led Barth to design Opus Magnum to generate solution GIFs with seamlessly repeating loops that looked appealing and required little context for players to understand.

As with several of Barth's recent titles, he opted to release a near-completed version of the game on early access via Steam prior to issuing a full release. The game was first put onto early access on October 19, 2017. It was fully released on December 8, 2017. While previous games from the developer were sold on both Steam and GOG.com, the latter initially declined to distribute Opus Magnum due to its resemblance to a mobile game. While GOG representatives initially claimed that the game had failed the site's internal curation system, and that its user base would not want to purchase it, on January 31, 2018, the site reversed its position after a fan outcry, and began offering it for sale, stating that their initial perception of the game's quality and community demand had been incorrect.

=== Opus Magnum: De Re Metallica ===
On February 19, 2026, 8 years after the initial release and more than 3 years after Zach Barth declared "Zachtronics is over", the studio announced Opus Magnum: De Re Metallica, a DLC adding three prequel chapters to the story and a total of 17 new puzzles. De Re Metallica was released on March 17, 2026 for Linux, MacOS and Windows and on the same day with the base game as Opus Magnum: The Complete Edition for Nintendo Switch.

== Reception ==
Reception

Aggregate score
Aggregator	Score
Metacritic	(PC) 90/100

Opus Magnum received "universal acclaim" according to review aggregator Metacritic.

The game was nominated for "Best Puzzle Game" in IGN's Best of 2017 Awards, and for "Best Indie Game" and "Best PC Game" at the 2018 Golden Joystick Awards, and won the award for "Excellence in Design" at the Independent Games Festival Awards, whereas its other nomination was for the Seumas McNally Grand Prize.
