= Arranger: A Role-Puzzling Adventure =

2024 video game

- Developers: Furniture & Mattress
- Publishers: Furniture & Mattress
- Engine: Unity
- Platforms: Android; iOS; macOS; Nintendo Switch; PlayStation 5; Windows
- Release: WW: July 25, 2024
- Genre: Puzzle
- Mode: Single-player

Arranger: A Role-Puzzling Adventure is a 2024 puzzle video game developed and published by Furniture & Mattress. Players solve sliding puzzles to move the protagonist on a grid.

== Gameplay ==
Jemma, a misfit, seeks to escape from her small town and to go on adventures. Arranger is a puzzle video game in which players move Jemma and other objects by sliding the rows or columns of a grid, though some barriers can not be moved. For example, players can slide a sword up so it is across from an immovable monster, then slide the sword until it collides with the monster and kills it. Rows and columns wrap around. Each level has a puzzle that must be solved, and they become more difficult. Players who become stuck can bypass most levels if they wish.

== Development ==
Furniture & Mattress received financial support from Astra Fund for the development of Arranger: A Role-Puzzling Adventure.

The game was released for Android, iOS, macOS, Nintendo Switch, PlayStation 5, and Windows on July 25, 2024. The iOS and Android versions are available at no additional cost to users with an active Netflix subscription.

== Reception ==
Reception

Aggregate scores
Aggregator	Score
Metacritic	PC: 82/100; PS5: 81/100; NS: 81/100
OpenCritic	75% recommend

Review scores
Publication	Score
Eurogamer	4/5
Nintendo Life	8/10
Push Square	8/10
TouchArcade	5/5

Arranger received positive reviews on Metacritic. Rock Paper Shotgun said that although it seems simple at first, the puzzles can be complex and fun. They enjoyed the story but criticized the ending for being more heavy-handed and predictable. The ability to bypass puzzles caused them to feel safe in recommending it to newer players. Eurogamer called it "a lovely mixture of puzzling and exploration" in which puzzle solutions feel simple and logical despite being difficult to explain to others. Push Square said the puzzles are "simple but well designed" and varied enough to keep them fresh. Although they criticized the story for leaving some parts unresolved, they enjoyed the writing overall. Praising its story, Nintendo Life recommended it to people looking for more than just a puzzle game. Polygon called it "not to be missed" for its combination of puzzles and story. TouchArcade said it is "a gorgeous and essential puzzle game" and the reviewer's favorite puzzle game so far of 2024.
