= Exapunks =

2018 programming video game

- Developer: Zachtronics
- Publisher: Zachtronics
- Designer: Zach Barth
- Writer: Matthew Burns
- Platforms: Windows, Linux, macOS
- Release: October 22, 2018
- Genre: Programming
- Mode: Single player

Exapunks is a programming game developed by Zachtronics. It was released into early access on August 9, 2018, and fully released on October 22, 2018.

== Gameplay ==
Exapunks takes place in an alternate timeline in the year 1997. The fictional world of Exapunks is heavily computerized, and a disease called "the phage" is ravaging the population, turning the bodies of those affected into computerized components. The player takes on the role of Moss, a hacker who breaks into computer systems in order to afford a $700/day drug to slow the progress of his phage affliction. His hacking missions are given to him by a mysterious artificial intelligence known as EMBER-2.

Each mission takes place inside a network of interconnected and specialized computer systems. Using programmable software agents called EXAs, the player must accomplish each given task by writing computer code to cleverly manipulate the data stored on the network's systems. The EXAs' instruction set features a few simple opcodes for movement, data processing, network messaging, and interfacing with files and registers. Due to their limited memory capacity, these tasks often require several agents working together in a highly coordinated fashion. EXA units also have the ability to replicate themselves inside the network. Typical missions include retrieving data from secured storage systems, hacking into company databases, and causing an automated teller machine to dispense free cash. Some puzzles also require the player to hack Moss's body to maintain his health. Some puzzles challenge the player to hacker battles, where they must pit their EXAs against an opponent's agents, for example altering a television station's program to broadcast Moss' content instead.

Players are generally free to write code for EXAs with as many EXAs as necessary, those are often limited by the number of opcodes that can be used. The player's solution must satisfy 100 different case scenarios iterating on the same problem. When the player demonstrates a successful solution, the game records how many cycles the solution took, the size of their code across all EXAs, and the number of movement and kill commands executed by the solution. These are tracked against other players' scores via histograms and friends' scoreboards, allowing players to try to optimize their solutions. Instructions for EXAs as well as additional useful information for some of the simulated systems are provided by issues of "Trash World News", a fictional zine; players can view these issues digitally, print them out, or buy a physical copy from Zachtronics. After completing a number of puzzles, the player gains access to both a puzzle editor to make new puzzles that can be uploaded to the Steam Workshop, as well as access to an in-game handheld game console, called Redshift, and program games for it. A free Redshift player was released by Zachtronics allowing any player, even those who had not purchased Exapunks, to play other players' Redshift creations. There is also a simple solitaire game and a tile-matching game unlocked through progression of the main story.

== Development ==
Zach Barth, the founder of Zachtronics, was inspired to create Exapunks after reading about the Stuxnet viruses that had impacted a nuclear facility in Iran in 2010. Barth said that Stuxnet "sparked the idea of these malicious programs that are designed to unfold like origami into a specific network and manipulate it in some way". He developed Exapunks's lore on the cyberspace culture envisioned by William Gibson, though with more focus on the "punk" side of the 1980s and 1990s - small-time hackers fighting against large corporations. He also took inspiration from 2600: The Hacker Quarterly and attended various DEF CON events, while the game's writer, Matthew Burns, also considered cyberculture works like Wired, Transmetropolitan and Tom Clancy's Net Force Explorers influential. Barth also considered how films like Hackers made the hacking culture cool.

In terms of developing the EXA's opcodes, Barth borrowed concepts common to many real operating systems like Unix for file operations and links, and envisioned the EXAs as elements of the Magic Cap metaphor for computing systems.

Zachtronics announced Exapunks on July 18, 2018; the studio said it would follow a similar release approach they had done for previous games Shenzhen I/O and Opus Magnum by using an early access period for a nearly feature-complete game to gain and implement feedback from players before releasing the final game. The Early Access was to start August 21, 2018, but Zachtronics released the game earlier on August 9, 2018. The full version of Exapunks out of Early Access was released on October 22, 2018.

== Reception ==
Initial reception of the game was positive. Rock Paper Shotgun included Exapunks on its list of "10 Best Hacking Coding and Computing Games", calling it "...an accurate portrayal of the decade (the ’90s)." while Jeff Gerstmann of Giant Bomb said "It's awesome."
