= Where the Water Tastes Like Wine =

2018 video game

- Developers: Dim Bulb Games; Serenity Forge
- Publishers: Good Shepherd Entertainment; Serenity Forge; PM Studios
- Composer: Ryan Ike
- Engine: Unity
- Platforms: Linux; macOS; Microsoft Windows; Nintendo Switch; PlayStation 4; Xbox One
- Release: Linux, macOS, Microsoft Windows; February 28, 2018; Nintendo Switch, PlayStation 4, Xbox One; November 29, 2019
- Genre: Adventure
- Mode: Single-player

Where the Water Tastes Like Wine is an adventure game developed by Dim Bulb Games and Serenity Forge, and published by Good Shepherd Entertainment. It was released for Linux, macOS, Microsoft Windows in February 2018. In November 2019, Serenity Forge announced that Where the Water Tastes Like Wine would also be released on the Nintendo Switch, PlayStation 4, and Xbox One. In August 2021, PM Studios published a physical version of the game for the Nintendo Switch and PlayStation 4.

== Gameplay ==
Where the Water Tastes Like Wine is a narrative-driven adventure game. Players explore a Great Depression-era United States, hearing and collecting oral stories and passing them along. Stories are used as a form of progression, with characters gradually opening up to the player in response to the provided stories, which in turn allows one to learn their true stories. The player may purchase goods to replenish their hunger or tiredness, with money being earned and then spent on the aforementioned goods, or in faster means of transportation. Several means of transport are available, including walking, hitchhiking and freighthopping.

== Development and release ==
Where the Water Tastes Like Wine was developed by Dim Bulb Games and Serenity Forge. "[Going] where the water tastes like wine" is an excerpt from the traditional American folk song "Going Down the Road Feeling Bad" (also known as the "Lonesome Road Blues"). The game was published by Good Shepherd Entertainment. The game was released for Linux, macOS and Microsoft Windows on 28 February 2018. According to the developer, the game's initial release was a commercial disaster.

On November 8, Serenity Forge announced the game would be coming to the Nintendo Switch, PlayStation 4, and Xbox One on November 29.

In August 2021, PM Studios published a limited physical version of the game for the Nintendo Switch and PlayStation 4 via Limited Run Games.

== Reception ==
Reception

Aggregate score
Aggregator	Score
Metacritic	PC: 74/100; NS: 69/100

Review scores
Publication	Score
Destructoid	8.5/10
Edge	5/10
Eurogamer	Recommended
Game Informer	9/10
GameSpot	6/10
Hardcore Gamer	4.5/5
PC Gamer (US)	58/100
Polygon	7.5/10
USgamer	2.5/5
VentureBeat	75/100

Where the Water Tastes Like Wine received "mixed or average" reviews according to review aggregator Metacritic with the Switch version receiving slightly worse reviews than the PC version. It was awarded the Developers Choice Award along with Walden, a game at the 2017 IndieCade Festival. However, in the months following release, creator Johnnemann Nordhagen wrote in his postmortem, "I can't discuss exact numbers, but in the first few weeks fewer people bought the game than I have Twitter followers, and I don't have a lot of Twitter followers," and "At the end of the day it's astounding that a game that got this much attention from the press, that won awards, that had an all-star cast of writers and performers, that had a bizarre celebrity guest appearance [by the musician Sting] failed this hard." Nordhagen writes, "Basically, I'm not sure that games like this one can continue to be made in the current market."

=== Soundtrack ===
The soundtrack of Where the Water Tastes Like Wine gained praise as an authentic representation of Americana: The 30-track compilation spans folk, jazz, country, blues, bluegrass, and more. The soundtrack was licensed and released by video game music label Materia Collective. A limited edition vinyl was pressed by Laced Records.

=== Awards ===
Year	Award	Category	Result	Ref
2017	SXSW Gamer's Voice Awards	Gamer's Voice (Single Player)	Nominated	
2018	Independent Games Festival Awards	Excellence in Narrative	Nominated	
2019	New York Game Awards	Herman Melville Award for Best Writing	Nominated	
2019	National Academy of Video Game Trade Reviewers Awards	Song, Original or Adapted ("White Rider")	Nominated	
2019	National Academy of Video Game Trade Reviewers Awards	Writing in a Drama	Nominated	
2019	SXSW Gaming Awards	Matthew Crump Cultural Innovation Award	Nominated	
2019	2019 G.A.N.G. Awards	Best Original Soundtrack Album	Nominated	
2019	2019 G.A.N.G. Awards	Best Original Song ("Heavy Hands")	Nominated	
