= Ironclad Tactics =

2013 strategy video game

- Developer: Zachtronics
- Publisher: Zachtronics
- Designers: Zach Barth; Keith Holman
- Programmers: Keith Holman; Collin Arnold
- Artists: Derek Blair; Kyle Steed; Steffani Charano
- Writer: Hillary Barth
- Composer: Evan LE NY
- Platforms: Microsoft Windows; OS X Linux; Android; PlayStation 4
- Release: Microsoft Windows, OS X, Linux; September 18, 2013; Android; October 6, 2014; PlayStation 4; January 20, 2015
- Genre: Strategy
- Modes: Single-player, multiplayer

Ironclad Tactics is a strategy-based video game created by independent developer Zachtronics. The game takes place in an alternate history at the onset of the American Civil War where robot-like "ironclad" machines are used alongside human troops by both sides in the war. The game incorporates elements of collectible card games, whereby the player constructs a deck of cards earned from previous matches for the deployment, outfitting, and tactics of human and ironclad troops to achieve specific victory conditions. The game features single player and co-operative multiplayer campaign modes as well as skirmishes between two players. The game was released for Microsoft Windows, OS X, and Linux-based computers in September 2013, and later for Android devices and the PlayStation 4.

== Plot ==
The game is set in an alternate history at the onset of the American Civil War in 1860, and follows the story of Maxwell and Joseph, who are both employed by the United States Navy's Bureau of Steam Engineering. They have developed robotic units called "ironclads" (supplanting the ironclad warship). They learn that after the Battle of Fort Sumter that the Confederate forces also have ironclad units, and they are ordered to help fight the Confederate forces with their ironclad forces.

== Gameplay ==
Ironclad Tactics is a strategy game where the player deploys and controls a number of human and ironclad units across a grid-like battlefield divided into a number of lanes, using actions determined from their current five-card hand. The game is turn-based, giving time for players to play cards before resolving all actions for that turn, but these turns are on a brief timer, simulating a real-time strategy game. All players and computer opponents play their cards simultaneously.

Prior to a given mission or round, the player assembles a deck of twenty cards from those they have earned from previous missions. The player starts the match with 3 cards and a new card is automatically drawn each turn; the player is limited to a hand of five cards and if a card is not used in five turns, it is discarded. The player's draw deck is reshuffled from played and discarded cards when empty. Each card costs a number of action points (AP) to play. The player's AP accumulates each turn at a rate of approximately 1 AP per turn but can be influenced by a number of factors, such as if there are other cooperative players working alongside them, or if the player holds specific spots on the current battlefield.

Cards fall into four categories: human troops, ironclad units, parts to equip on ironclads, and tactics. Once either human or ironclad units are deployed in a specific lane, they will continue forward until they hit an obstacle or another unit, ordered by the player to stop, moved to another lane, or reaches the far end of the map. Most ironclad units can be equipped with parts such as weapons or armor to help in combat. Tactics are used to maneuver units to new lanes on the battlefield, heal ironclads, or one-time effects. Many cards have a means to gain more powerful version of the cards by completing certain goals through the game's campaign. For example, veteran riflement troops can be obtain by deploying a minimum number of normal riflemen troops.

The goal in each match is typically to earn a number of victory points before the other side. Most often, this is done by having ironclad units successfully cross the battlefield, earning a number of points depending on the unit type. There are other means of earning victory points that may be specific to the battlefield, for example by holding onto mortars spaces for the duration of a turn earns a point. Other maps may feature different goals such as holding out against an enemy barrage for a number of turns, preventing the opposite side from scoring enough victory points to win.

In addition to the game's campaign mode which can be played alone or in cooperative multiplayer, certain maps have puzzle challenges, where the player must find a way to achieve victory with a specific set of cards given to them. Other matches feature skirmishes where players can challenge others with each side using the same card deck.

== Development ==
Zachtronics announced the game in August 2012, and was released through Steam for Windows, OS X, and Linux computers on September 18, 2013.

== Reception ==
Ironclad Tactics was met with mixed reviews upon release and has a Metacritic rating of 69.

PC Gamer said "A clever reworking of the card-based strategy game formula, which could stand to be just a little more rewarding" and awarded the game a 70/100.
