= Zachtronics =

American video game developer

Zachtronics LLC
- Industry: Video games
- Founded: 2011; 15 years ago
- Founders: Zach Barth
- Defunct: 2022; 4 years ago
- Headquarters: Redmond, Washington, United States
- Products: SpaceChem; Infinifactory; Opus Magnum; TIS-100; Shenzhen I/O
- Parent: Alliance Media Holdings
- Website: zachtronics.com

Zachtronics LLC was an American video game developer, best known for engineering-oriented puzzle video games and programming games. It was founded by Zach Barth in 2011, who served as its lead designer. Their games include SpaceChem, Opus Magnum, Infinifactory, TIS-100, Shenzhen I/O and Infiniminer, the last of which inspired the creation of Minecraft.

== History ==
=== Early games ===
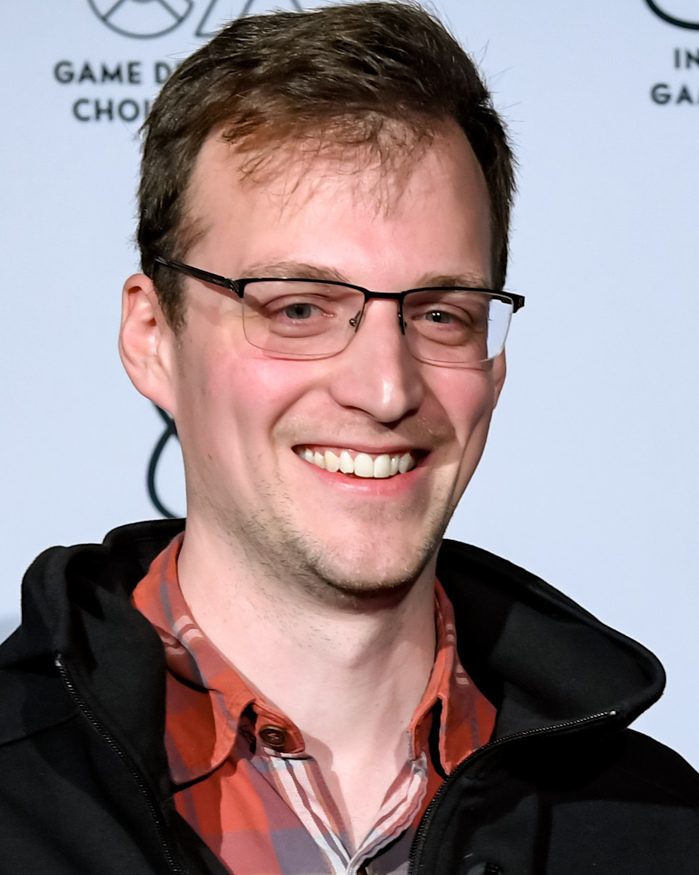
Zachtronics' founder Zach Barth in 2019

Zach Barth started creating games early in life and further developed his programming skills at Rensselaer Polytechnic Institute (RPI), where he joined the game development club. Barth studied computer systems engineering and computer science at RPI. He was one of three students leading the interdisciplinary team of the CapAbility Games Research Project, a collaboration of RPI with the Center for Disability Services in Albany, New York. In 2008, the team produced Capable Shopper, a shopping simulation game for players with various degrees of disability.

Barth's initial games were generally free browser games offered on his website, Zachtronics Industries. One of these was Infiniminer, the block-building game which inspired Markus Persson to create Minecraft. His earlier, non-commercial, games included twenty that were published on his old website and "five good ones" which he transferred over to the new site. Four of these use Adobe Flash to make them cross-platform, in spite of Flash's development environment. The other one is based on .NET Framework for greater programming convenience. SpaceChem also used .NET, as Barth considers C# to be his favorite programming language. For marketing reasons, Barth decided against Microsoft XNA with its capability to cross-publish to Xbox 360, and switched to OpenGL, which allowed him to target the three operating systems required for inclusion in the Humble Indie Bundle.

=== Commercial titles ===
After completing The Codex of Alchemical Engineering and getting positive feedback from it, Barth decided to pursue making commercial games. In 2011 Barth founded Zachtronics LLC for the release of his first commercial title SpaceChem. SpaceChem was also the first game where he took in a number of collaborators to help. The game was critically praised, which led Barth to continue developing commercial games. A few ideas failed to come to light, and with expectations for the studio to make another game, he opted to make Ironclad Tactics, which was more a real-time based card game rather than a puzzle game. Before the release of Ironclad Tactics the studios name was shortened from Zachtronics Industries to Zachtronics. Ironclad Tactics did not do as well as SpaceChem, and Barth realized there was more a market for the puzzle games that he had previously developed, and turned back to his Flash-based games. Initially he looked to take The Codex of Alchemical Engineering to make it a full commercial release, but instead ended up producing Infinifactory and later TIS-100.

In 2015, Barth joined Valve to work on SteamVR. He worked there for 10 months before departing. Near the time he started to work at Valve, Barth had been considering shutting down Zachtronics due to stress of running the business alongside the new responsibilities at Valve. Sometime between the release of TIS-100 and Shenzhen I/O, Barth had come into contact with Alliance Media Holdings who offered to buy the studio and to manage the publishing of the games, while allowing Barth to retain his creative lead and control. Since the studio's acquisition, it has published Shenzhen I/O, Opus Magnum, and Exapunks.

In June 2019, the studio published the book Zach-Like that includes design documents and other reference material used by Barth and his team during the development of his games. Zachtronics used Kickstarter to produce physical copies of the book by early 2019, and by June 2019 released the title as a free eBook on Steam along with a bundle of Barth's older titles. The studio launched Zachademics in July 2019, a program to allow educational and non-profit institutions to freely download and use several of his games for educational purposes.

With the release of Last Call BBS in July 2022, Zachtronics announced that that would likely be the last game they develop, as they "felt it was time for a change." Barth also said the decision was motivated by the fact that Zachtronics was only making games of a similar puzzle nature, keeping them "locked into doing something we didn't feel like doing forever," whereas moving on would allow him and other members of the team to work on other types of games.

=== Post-Zachtronics ===
After the closure of Zachtronics, Barth and others from the company formed Coincidence, which describes itself as a "flexible business framework" that allowed them to produce a variety of creative products such as card games and educational games. Coincidence announced Kaizen: A Factory Story in February 2025, a puzzle game similar to those released under Zachtronics, in which players are tasked with assembling machines inspired by the Japanese asset price bubble in the 1980s and 1990s.

More than three years after Zach Barth declared "Zachtronics is over" in 2022, Opus Magnum: De Re Metallica, a new DLC for Opus Magnum was announced on February 19, 2026. A representative for the studio said "the future of Zachtronics and revisiting and expanding on other titles is unknown at this time."

== Games developed ==
Zachtronics' games have generally been focused around engineering puzzle games, designing machines or the equivalent to take input and make output; these are generally part of the broader class of programming games. These games, including SpaceChem, Infinifactory, and Opus Magnum, feature multiple puzzles that are open ended in solution; as long as the player can make the required output, the game considers that puzzle solved and allows the player to access the next puzzle. Atop their solution, the player is shown statistics related to their solution which relate to some efficiency - how fast their solution completed the puzzle, how few parts they used, and the like. These stats are given with histograms from other players, including their friends via the game's storefront, that have also completed that puzzle. This gives a type of competitiveness to the game for players to find ways to optimize their solutions and improve their relative scores. Newer games also feature support for user-created puzzles.

Year	Title	Notes
2009	Infiniminer	Published for free on Zach Barth's website
2009	KOHCTPYKTOP: Engineer of the People	
2011	SpaceChem	Published under the name Zachtronics Industries
2013	Ironclad Tactics	
2015	Infinifactory	
2015	TIS-100	
2016	Shenzhen I/O	
2017	Opus Magnum	
2018	Exapunks	
2019	Eliza	
2019	MOLEK-SYNTEZ	
2020	Möbius Front '83	
2021	Nerts! Online	
2022	Last Call BBS	
2022	The Zachtronics Solitaire Collection	
2024	Add Astra	Developed under Coincidence Games
2025	Kaizen: A Factory Story	Developed under Coincidence Games
2026	U.V.S. Nirmana	Developed under Coincidence Games
