= Son of the Guardsman =

- Directed by: Derwin Abrahams
- Screenplay by: George Plympton; Harry Fraser; Lewis Clay
- Produced by: Sam Katzman
- Starring: Bob Shaw; Daun Kennedy; Robert (Buzz) Henry; Jim Diehl; Hugh Prosser; Leonard Penn
- Narrated by: Knox Manning (uncredited)
- Cinematography: Ira Morgan
- Edited by: Earl Turner
- Music by: Lee Zahler (musical direction)
- Distributed by: Columbia Pictures Corporation
- Release date: October 24, 1946
- Country: United States
- Language: English

Son of the Guardsman (Gallant Fighter of the Greenwood) is an American film serial released in 1946 by Columbia Pictures. It was the 31st of the 57 serials produced by that studio.

Son of the Guardsman is a rare serial with a period setting, in this case 12th century England. The serial is largely based on the Robin Hood legends, to the extent of including outlaws from Sherwood Forest, but it does not include or reference Robin Hood himself.

The serial was produced by the notoriously cheap Sam Katzman and directed by Derwin Abrahams. Bob Shaw starred as the heroic noble-turned-outlaw David Trent with Charles King as his villainous uncle Sir Edgar Bullard.

== Plot ==
Set in the High Middle Ages, Sir Edgar Bullard conspires to conquer England. In doing so, he kidnaps the daughter of his rival, Lord Markham. This causes his nephew, David Trent, to turn against him and join the outlaws in Sherwood Forest, who are led by Allan Hawk. Meanwhile, the outlaws of the forest support Prince Richard as the rightful ruler of England, who has been usurped by the regent Lord Hampton.

== Cast ==
- Bob Shaw as David Trent, nobleman turned outlaw
- Daun Kennedy as Lady Louise Markham, daughter of Lord Markham
- Robert (Buzz) Henry as "Roger Mowbry", really Prince Richard in disguise
- Jim Diehl as Allan Hawk, leader of the Sherwood Forest outlaws
- Hugh Prosser as Red Robert
- Leonard Penn as Mark Crowell

Uncredited:

- Jock Mahoney as Captain Kenley
- Charles King as Sir Edgar Bullard, David Trent's evil uncle
- John Merton as Lord Hampton, the evil regent

== Production ==
Son of the Guardsman is based on the Robin Hood legends, although it does not include Robin Hood, just the period and Sherwood Forest setting. The serial was made to use costumes and sets left over from feature films, amortising the costs of all the productions involved. Costume drama serials were rare productions for any producer. The serial's subtitle was "Gallant Fighter of the Greenwood".

=== Stunts ===
- Jock Mahoney

== Chapter titles ==
1. Outlaws of Sherwood Forest
2. Perils of the Forest
3. Blazing Barrier
4. The Siege of Bullard Hall
5. A Dagger in the Dark
6. A Fight for Freedom
7. Trial by Torture
8. Mark Crowell's Treachery
9. Crushed to Earth
10. A Throne at Stake
11. Double Danger
12. The Secret of the Treasure
13. Into the Depths
14. The Lost Heritage
15. Free Men Triumph

_{Source:}

== See also ==
- List of film serials by year
- List of film serials by studio

Preceded by Chick Carter, Detective (1946)	Columbia Serial; Son of the Guardsman (1946)	Succeeded by Jack Armstrong (1947)
