= Critical Path (book) =

1981 book by Richard Buckminster Fuller

- First edition
- Author: R. Buckminster Fuller
- Language: English
- Subject: history of civilization, Economic Ideology, Globalization
- Publisher: St Martins Press
- Publication date: 1981
- Publication place: United States
- Media type: Print (Paperback)
- Pages: 471
- ISBN: 0-312-17491-8
- OCLC: 8051709
- Dewey Decimal: 909 19
- LC Class: CB19 .F84 1981

Critical Path is a book written by US author and inventor R. Buckminster Fuller with the assistance of Kiyoshi Kuromiya. First published in 1981, it is alongside Operating Manual for Spaceship Earth one of Fuller's best-known works. Vast in its scope, it describes Fuller's own vision of the development of human civilization, economic history, and his highly original economic ideology based, amongst other things, on his detailed description of why scarcity of resources need no longer be a decisive factor in global politics.

== Overview ==
The following is a list of the main claims and opinions presented in the book, reported without discussion or criticism.

=== Part One ===
The first part of the book explains the history and present state of the global economy.

==== Chapter 1 - Speculative Prehistory of Humanity ====
Human life began in the atolls of the South Pacific, where the average sea temperature is closest to that of the human body (p. 6). Rather than evolving from simpler organisms, humanity was of extraterrestrial origin and other organisms evolved from us (p. 7). From this base, humanity developed boat-building in Southeast Asia and colonised the rest of the planet (p. 15). There is evidence that the Bronze Age began in Southeast Asia (p. 17). Fuller's Dymaxion World Map is used to show the distribution of humanity over the Earth's surface. Over half the population lives in the regions watered by the Himalayan glaciers (p. 20).

==== Chapter 2 - Humans in Universe ====
Our knowledge of the spherical shape of the Earth is central to our understanding of ecology (p. 34). This knowledge probably originated in prehistoric times, was certainly known to the Ancient Greeks, but was then suppressed for centuries by organised religion because it was incompatible with the official story of a Heaven above and a Hell below (p. 43). There has been an evolution of religious ideas from those of the Egyptian pyramid-builders, whose ambition was to deliver a single individual, the pharaoh, into the afterlife, to the modern belief that everybody has a right to enjoy life on Earth (p. 51).

==== Chapter 3 - Legally Piggily ====
Fire is the Sun unwinding from the tree's log.

— Fuller, p.62

Human history has been shaped by the continual growth and success of greed. City-states were the first institutions to make organised use of extortion (p. 68). This was then followed by the growth of international trade, which appropriates the wealth of the planet for its own ends. Corruption in the form of "lawyer-capitalism" has led the US to become effectively bankrupt (p. 114), with the common people obliged to fund the profitmaking activity of corporations. (p. 101)

Eventually the U.S. taxpayers will be asked to make "free-of-risk" bail-outs of "private" enterprises

— Fuller, p.87

=== Part Two ===
The second part of the book explains Fuller's getting a perspective.

==== Chapter 4 - Self-Disciplines of Buckminster Fuller ====
Fuller's diary, the "Chronofile", is intended to show how much a single human being with little money can do to influence world affairs (p. 128). The mechanical principle of precession is used as a metaphor for the ability of a person to influence the world by applying pressure in an unconventional direction (p. 144). Fuller's religious beliefs are explained (p. 151).

Fuller observed that when he did things for the benefit of others, it had a positive effect on his life, but when he did things merely for his personal benefit, the outcome was negative. This eventually led him to the proposition that if he dedicated his life to the betterment of humanity, he would achieve the greatest positive outcome. So he decided to live his entire life as an experiment to prove or disprove this proposition. He writes (p. 145):

I assumed that nature would "evaluate" my work as I went along. If I was doing what nature wanted done, and if I was doing it in promising ways, permitted by nature's principles, I would find my work being economically sustained—and vice versa, in which latter negative case I must quickly cease doing what I had been doing and seek logically alternative courses until I found the new course that nature signified her approval of by providing for its physical support. Wherefore, I concluded that I would be informed by nature if I proceeded in the following manner:

(A) committed myself, my wife, and our infant daughter directly to the design, production, and demonstration of artifact accommodation of the most evident but as-yet-unattended-to human-environment-advantaging physical evolutionary tasks, and (B) paid no attention to "earning a living" in humanity's established economic system, yet (C) found my family's and my own life's needs being unsolicitedly provided for by seemingly pure happenstance and always only "in the nick of time," and (D) being provided for "only coincidentally," yet found (E) that this only "coincidentally," unbudgetable, yet realistic support persisted, and did so (F) only so long as I continued spontaneously to commit myself unreservedly to the task of developing relevant artifacts, and if I (G) never tried to persuade humanity to alter its customs and viewpoints and never asked anyone to listen to me and spoke informatively to others only when they asked me so to do, and if I (H) never undertook competitively to produce artifacts others were developing, and attended only to that which no others attended

then I could tentatively conclude that my two assumptions were valid: (1) that nature might economically sustain human activity that served directly in the "mainstream" realization of essential cosmic regeneration, which had hitherto been accomplished only through seeming "right-angled" side effects of the chromosomically focused biological creatures; and (2) that the generalized physical law of precessional behaviors does govern socioeconomic behaviors as do also the generalized laws of acceleration and ephemeralization.

==== Chapter 5 - The Geoscope ====
The Geoscope is a large-scale, animated globe of the Earth intended to help people visualise the spatial and temporal patterns of human activity, either in real time or replayed at different speeds. If the human mind is presented with all of this information at once, it should be able to use its visual pattern-detecting abilities to solve complex problems such as weather-forecasting, resource conflicts, and wars (p. 183). Data for the Geoscope can come from the world maps produced by the US, using radio triangulation, during and after World War II (p. 184). Geodesic domes will be built to enclose entire cities (p. 179). Afghanistan was the heartland of the Cold War world, as it gave the USSR the potential of a route through Iran to the Indian Ocean (p. 194).

==== Chapter 6 - World Game ====
The World Game is a simulation of global economic activity. Computers can be used to calculate the optimal answer to any economic, technological or social question. The computers will tell us that the true cost to the environment of using fossil fuels is prohibitive, and renewable energy should be used instead. The true energy cost of a gallon of gasoline is more than one million (1980) US dollars. The amount of scrap metals in circulation means that no more mining is necessary (p. 205). A global electrical supply grid will enable more efficient use of energy, and make intermittent renewable energy more practical (p. 202).

Experience can only increase

— Fuller, p.198

We have four billion billionaires aboard our planet, as accounted by real wealth

— Fuller, p.199

It costs ... more than a million dollars to produce each gallon of petroleum when the amount of energy as heat and pressure used for the length of time necessary ... is charged for at [1980 U.S. retail rates for electrical energy]

— Fuller, p.200

There can be no planetary equity until all the sovereign nations are abolished and we have but one accounting system [i.e. electrical energy]

— RBF, p.202

The world's population will stop increasing when and if the integrated world electrical energy grid is realized.

— Fuller, p.206

It has been found that within a 100 mile radius a wind is always blowing.

— Fuller, p.208

=== Part Three ===
This part of the book explains Fuller's plan to set humanity on the path to a sustainable existence with no need to fight over resources.

==== Chapter 7 - Critical Path: Part One ====
Education is key to improving humanity's living conditions (p. 232). The USSR tried to destabilise the US education system by inciting its students to riot (p. 236). The Apollo Project had a critical path of two million tasks, one million of which required new technological solutions (p. 248). Fuller has applied a similar project-planning approach to the saving of humanity, and has created a list of critical-path items (p. 248).

by 1985 we should be able to transmit humans around the globe by radio scanning or an equivalently unexpected means

— Fuller, p.245

We are being taught by all the foregoing to assume as closely as possible the viewpoint, the patience, and the competence of God.

— Fuller, p.251

==== Chapter 8 - Critical Path: Part Two ====
Unlike the Apollo Project, the critical-path items in the project to save humanity can all be accomplished with existing technologies (p. 253). A global video education system must be developed (p. 265).

I am certain that none of the world's problems...have any hope of solution except through total democratic society's becoming thoroughly...self-educated.

— Fuller, p.266

==== Chapter 9 - Critical Path: Part Three ====
Corn is wasted in generating unnecessarily fatty but more profitable beef (p. 272).

Billions of dollars of government subsidies now go to the conglomerate farmland owners.

— Fuller, p.274

The drive to make money...seeks to monopolize order while leaving...disorder to overwhelm others.

— Fuller, p.276

In Los Angeles, private-incinerator and later car-pollution laws were passed to shift the blame for smog from industry to citizens (p. 279).

Today, big business ... is completely transnational. Now only the world's people are left bound within their respective 150 national pens.

— Fuller, p.285

In 1929 the USSR used its gold wealth relative to the USA's poverty to pay United States industry to set up industries in USSR, in USSR's first three 5-year plans (p. 289).

==== Chapter 10 - Critical Path: Part Four ====
Having committed ourselves to solving humanity's problems with artifacts...

— Fuller, p.309

The first task in humanity's critical path is to build a global electricity grid (p. 309). The second task is to provide movable dwellings for all - city-sized and family-sized domes (p. 310). Fuller has the following designs ready for production: the Fly's Eye Dome (p. 311); Old Man River's City project, East St. Louis (p. 315); Raleigh cotton mill (p. 325); Growth House - sustainable greenhouse (p. 329); O-Volving shelves (p. 331); tetrahedral floating city (p. 333); Cloud Nines - spherical floating cities (p. 336); 8,000-foot Tokyo Tower (p. 338); containerised passenger air travel (p. 340).

=== Appendices ===
- Appendix I - Chronology of Scientific Discoveries and Artifacts
- Appendix II - Chronological Inventory of Prominent Scientific, Technological, Economic, and Political World Events: 1895 to Date

== Concepts ==
- Critical path. The title of the book is a term used in project planning. To estimate the completion date of a project, a chart is drawn showing all of the necessary sub-tasks and their durations, placed in chronological order. The last task cannot begin until all of tasks on which it depends have been completed. These tasks depend, in turn, on other tasks. It is usually possible to draw numerous paths through the chart from beginning to end, but it is the longest path, called the critical path, that determines the time that the project will take to complete. The book refers frequently to the Apollo Project, which was planned using this method. Fuller's plan to reorganise the global economy in a sustainable way also has a critical path, which is identified in the book.
- Spaceship Earth. The Earth's material resources, like those of a spaceship, are finite. The book explains that early humans did not understand this, because the Earth seemed like a boundless flat surface. We now know that the Earth is a sphere, and this fact should inform all of our decisions.
- Personal integrity. Critical Path is part manifesto, part autobiography. Fuller admits in one place that this is "egostistical" (p. 378), but excuses this by saying that he wants to show not just his conclusions, but also the thought processes that led to them. He believes that every person must think for himself and take as little as possible on trust (p.xi).

== Criticism ==
Mr. Fuller has always made himself easy to dismiss by wandering off the deep end of optimism, but a reading of Critical Path shows that the author, like Karl Marx, arrived at his vision of the ideal only after a serious attempt to understand the evolution of human affairs.

— James Traub, "Nonfiction in Brief", The New York Times, published April 19, 1981; accessed 2010-07-21

== See also ==
- Operating Manual for Spaceship Earth
- Technocracy movement
