= Amada (company) =

Japanese manufacturing company

Amada Co., Ltd.
- Type: Public
- Traded as: TYO: 6113
- Industry: Manufacturing
- Founded: May 1946; 80 years ago
- Headquarters: Kanagawa, Japan
- Products: Metal Working Machines
- Revenue: €2.1 billion (2013)
- Number of employees: 7,678 (2013)
- Website: www.amada.co.jp/en/

Amada Co., Ltd. (株式会社アマダ, Kabushiki-gaisha Amada) is a large Japanese manufacturer of metal processing equipment & machinery based in Kanagawa. Tsutome Isobe is the chairman of the company. The company manufactures metal cutting, forming, shearing, and punching machines. The company also develops factory automation systems and electronic equipment in addition to machine tools. Amada's products are used in fields such as the auto, computer, camera, and electric appliance industries.

== History ==
The company was incorporated in 1946. The company stocks are listed in Tokyo and Osaka Stock Exchanges.

In March 2013, Amada Co completed an approved takeover of Miyachi Corporation (MHC), making Miyachi America a consolidated subsidiary.
