= Monrovia Airport, California =

Airport in California, US, 1928 to 1952

Coordinates: 34.137°N 117.99°W

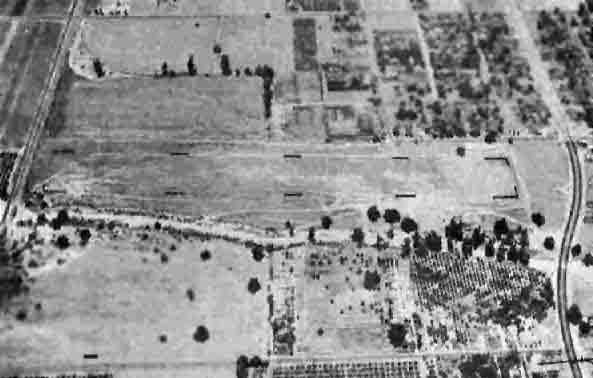
Monrovia Airport in 1945

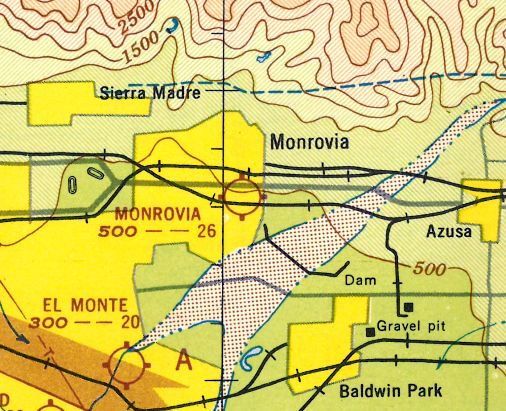
Monrovia Airport in 1946 map

Monrovia Airport, also called the Foothill Flying Field, was an American airport in Monrovia, California, active from 1928 to 1952.

== History ==
The airport was founded by the Monrovia Airport Club and Don Robertson on 35 acres (14 ha) of leased land. The spot was flat, level, and no work was needed to open the airport. The airport had a single 2,700-foot (820 m) north–south runway. The club built a hangar and owned two planes. In November 1930 the Foothill Flying Field became a commercial-municipal airport and three more hangars were built. The airport had a repair shop and by 1932 had flown 12,000 passengers.

Florence Lowe "Pancho" Barnes, an early movie stunt pilot, pioneer aviator, member of the Barnes Happy Bottom Riding Club and founder of the movie stunt pilots' union, used the Monrovia Airport. Kalman Irwin, an airshow pilot and TWA captain, was a frequent guest at the airport. Aviation pioneers the Riley Brothers, Eleanor and Elmer Riley, also used the airport.

With Hollywood only 25 miles (40 km) away, Monrovia Airport became a popular spot to shoot movies. The 1935 movie The Fighting Pilot, directed by Noel M. Smith and starring Richard Talmadge, Gertrude Messinger and Robert Frazer, was shot at the airport. In 1939 the film 20,000 Men a Year was shot at the airport, directed by Alfred E. Green, starring Randolph Scott, Preston Foster, Margaret Lindsay, Mary Healy, Robert Shaw and George Ernest. In 1940 The Great Plane Robbery was shot at the airport, directed by Lewis D. Collins and starring Jack Holt, Stanley Fields and Noel Madison. A review in the book VideoHound's Golden Movie Retriever gave The Great Plane Robbery one and a half stars. In 1944 The Big Noise starring Laurel and Hardy was shot at Monrovia Airport. The airport liked to call itself "America's Friendliest Airport" and used the slogan "See the Valley from the Air, Monrovia Airport Inc."

In 1934 Don Robertson sold the airport operations to Wymann Ellis and Dan Moran. The first airmail flight at Monrovia Airport was on May 19, 1938, by Moran. About 1941 Al Blackburn became the operator of the airport. Blackburn would do stunt flying in his Waco Aircraft biplane, NC-11490, at the airport. During World War II the Monrovia Civil Air Patrol operated out of the airport, and three more hangars were built. The Squadron Commander of the Monrovia Civil Air Patrol was Kenny McComb, who went on to become an instructor for the C.A.A. After the war, the airport incorporated, and Monrovia Aircraft Repair, Reliance Flight Academy, and Riley Flying Service operated out of the airport.

Monrovia Airport closed in 1952, and on February 26, 1952, the land was sold by Al Blackburn and Ruth Blackburn to Consolidated Engineering Corporation for redevelopment. The site now is car dealerships and Pink's Transfer, just north of the Foothill Freeway (I-210), between Shamrock and Mountain Avenue, south of Huntington Drive (Route 66), at an altitude of 500 feet (150 m). The hangars, repair shop and office were on Shamrock at Route 66.

== First McDonald's ==
The Airdrome restaurant was built by the brothers Richard and Maurice McDonald next to Monrovia Airport on Route 66. It was a small wooden octagonal building that was moved to 1398 North E Street in San Bernardino in 1940. The small restaurant was later renamed "McDonald's", thus becoming the first one of the company's long list of restaurants around the world. In 1953 the McDonald's restaurant was purchased by Ray Kroc and franchised. Those from the airport helped the Airdrome restaurant do very well selling hamburgers, hot dogs and fresh orange juice. Soon the McDonald brothers opened two more restaurants and brought their parents from New Hampshire to California.

== See also ==
- Oldest McDonald's restaurant
- T. Claude Ryan
- Ryan Aeronautical
