= 20,000 Men a Year =

1939 film by Alfred E. Green

- Theatrical release poster
- Directed by: Alfred E. Green
- Screenplay by: Lou Breslow; Owen Francis
- Story by: Frank Wead
- Produced by: Sol M. Wurtzel (Executive producer)
- Starring: Randolph Scott; Preston Foster; Margaret Lindsay; Mary Healy; Robert Shaw; George Ernest; Jane Darwell; Kane Richmond; Maxie Rosenbloom
- Cinematography: Ernest Palmer
- Edited by: Fred Allen
- Music by: Samuel Kaylin (Musical director)
- Production company: A Cosmopolitan Production
- Distributed by: 20th Century Fox
- Release date: October 27, 1939
- Running time: 84 minutes
- Country: United States
- Language: English

20,000 Men a Year (aka Air Story and Aviation Story) is a 1939 American action film directed by Alfred E. Green and written by Lou Breslow and Owen Francis. The film stars Randolph Scott, Preston Foster, Margaret Lindsay, Mary Healy, Robert Shaw, George Ernest, Jane Darwell, Kane Richmond and Maxie Rosenbloom. It was the fourth and last film produced by Cosmopolitan Pictures in its final year of operation.

Long before the attack on Pearl Harbor, the U.S. government had encouraged Hollywood to produce films designed to encourage a buildup of the aviation industry as well as the military. The release of 20,000 Men a Year on October 27, 1939, by 20th Century Fox reflected the spirit of the times. (Note: 20,000 Men a Year joined other Hollywood "patriotic" films such as Give Us Wings (1940), Keep 'Em Flying (1941), I Wanted Wings (1941), Flying Cadets (1941) and Thunder Birds (1942).)

== Plot ==
Brad Reynolds is a respected pilot for Pacific Airlines. On a flight from Salt Lake City to Los Angeles, his aircraft hits a thick bank of fog. Reynolds and his co-pilot, Al Williams, are told by their dispatcher to re-route to Saugus, California, but Brad safely lands in Los Angeles, anyway. Jim Howell, the Southwestern representative for the Civil Aeronautics Authority (CAA), and Brad's old nemesis, suspends Brad for 60 days who angrily quits. Brad buys the Comet Airport in Riverdale, California. The airport mechanic Walt Dorgan is its only asset.

Ann Rogers tells Brad that her brother Skip, Brad's top student, is flying without his family's consent. Brad is forced to return Skip's deposit just when the bank is about to foreclose on the airport. Brad tries to return to Pacific Airlines to ask for his old job, but is told that he is too old.

Meanwhile, the CAA begins a Civilian Pilot Training Program at selected universities, with local airports being used. Unknown to Brad, Jim Howell convinces Riverdale banker Crandall to back Brad's airport, as nearby Western Institute of Technology is chosen. Brad becomes an instructor and begins selecting and training his students. Transferring to Western from Texas State is Tommy Howell, Jim's little brother.

Skip, unable to get his sister's permission to fly, becomes Tommy's roommate, and arranges a meeting between Brad and Ann. Skip is allowed to take a ground crew course. During flight training, Tommy admits to Brad that he is afraid to fly and does so only to please his older brother. Brad gives Tommy early morning lessons in secret.

Jim thinks that Brad is unfair to his brother, but during one of Tommy's secret lessons, the aircraft's oil line breaks. Brad is forced to knock him out in order to release his hands on the throttle.

Tommy, thinking the aircraft is crashing, parachutes out over a cavernous mountain range. Brad lands the aircraft safely and convinces a farmer to drive him back to the airport. He takes a second aircraft up to search for Tommy, with Skip joining him.

Tommy is found hanging by his parachute from a tree over a cliff, and when Brad climbs the tree to release Tommy, a branch breaks, throwing Brad to the ground. With both legs injured, Brad is now unable to fly. When the group does not return, Walt is forced to tell Dean Norris all.

Norris calls Jim, and a search begins. The next morning, however, Skip tells Brad he must fly the aircraft out himself if the two are to survive. Brad agrees, giving Skip strict instructions on how to fly the aircraft out of the canyon. Skip takes off, but knocks off his left landing gear, trying to clear a mountain top.

At Comet Airport, Jim and his boss, Gerald Grant, await word from the search parties. Seeing Skip try to land, Walt blocks the runway with his jeep until Jim can take another aircraft up to warn Skip and Brad about their damaged aircraft.

Learning about the problem, Brad instructs Skip how to execute a safe landing, even on only two wheels. On his second pass at the runway, Skip successfully lands the aircraft.

Later, Tommy, Skip and the others finish their pilot training, as Brad and Ann are now together, planning their own futures.

== Cast ==
- Randolph Scott as Brad Reynolds
- Preston Foster as Jim Howell
- Margaret Lindsay as Ann Rogers
- Mary Healy as Joan Marshall
- Robert Shaw as Tommy Howell
- George Ernest as Skip Rogers
- Jane Darwell as Mrs. Allen
- Kane Richmond as Al Williams
- Maxie Rosenbloom as Walt Dorgan
- Douglas Wood as Crandall
- Sen Yung as Harold Chong
- Paul Stanton as Gerald Grant
- Tom Seidel as Wally Richards
- Edward Gargan as Dunk
- Harry Tyler as Joe Hungerford
- Sidney Miller as Irving Glassman
- Holmes Herbert as Dean Norris (uncredited)

== Production ==
Based on a story by veteran pilot and screenwriter, Frank "Spig" Wead, 20,000 Men a Year was the first film to document the Civilian Pilot Training Program. The sequences on both the ground and in the air serve as a semi-documentary of the program.

The film was shot at various locations including, in Zion National Park, the Grand Canyon, Cedar City, Utah and at Occidental College, Los Angeles, as well as the Monrovia Airport in Monrovia, California. Principal photography for 20,000 Men a Year took place on location from August 26 to October 1938.

The aircraft used in 20,000 Men a Year were provided by stunt pilot Paul Mantz, who acted as the "air boss" and coordinated aerial photography. The aircraft included his Stearman C3 as a camera platform.

== Reception ==
Film reviewer for The New York Times, Frank Nugent, described 20,000 Men a Year as "Never more than a sleeper jump behind the times, the screen has hurried around to the Roxy with a melodramatic salute to the aviation training program instituted not so long ago by the Civil Aeronautics Authority. '20,000 Men a Year', which is a statistical reference to the number of civil pilots the CAA hopes to be turning out ..."
