= Monrovia, California =

City in the United States

- City
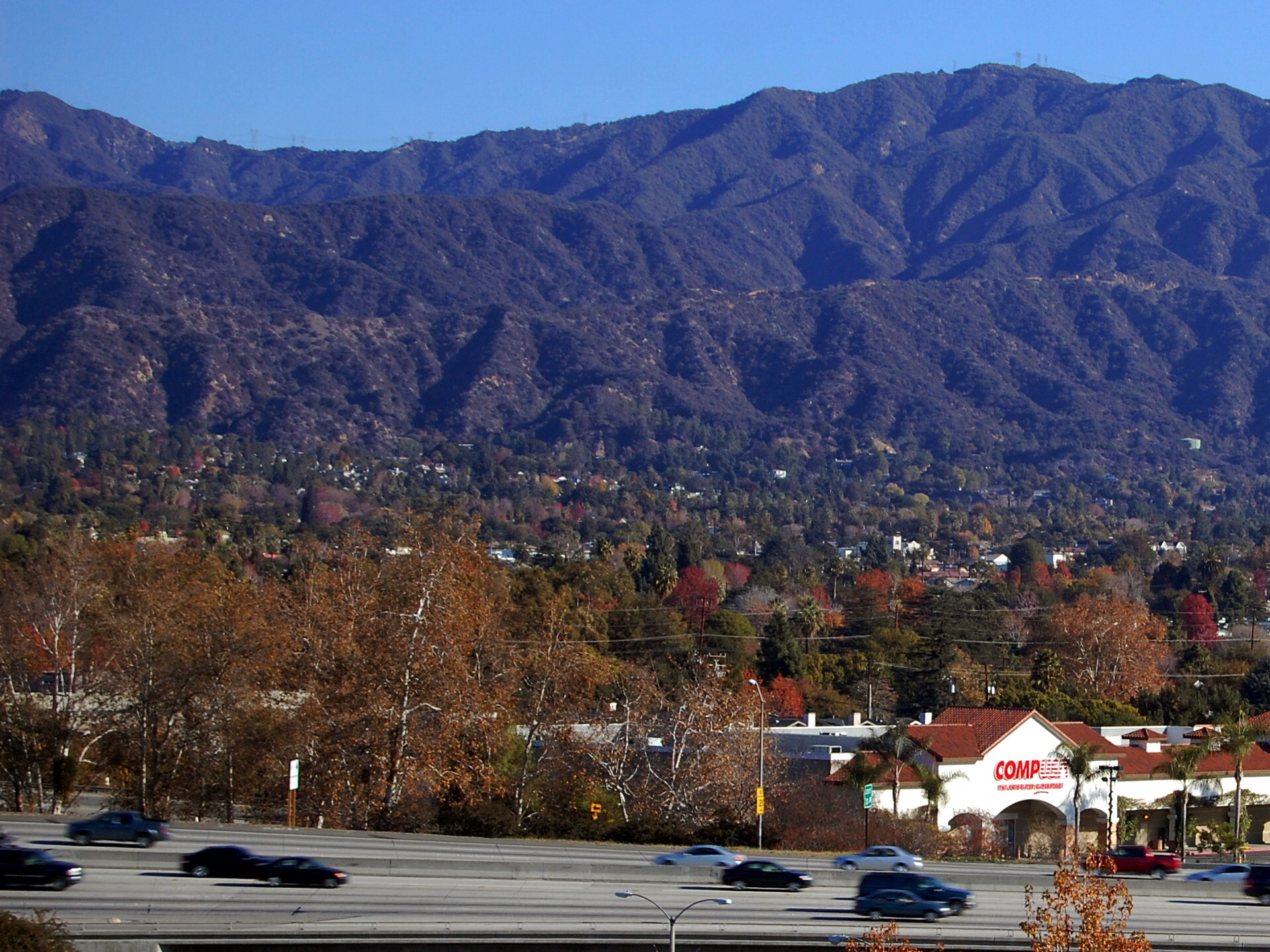
- I-210 in Monrovia with San Gabriel Mountains in the background

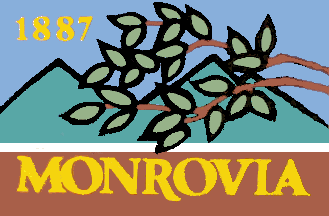
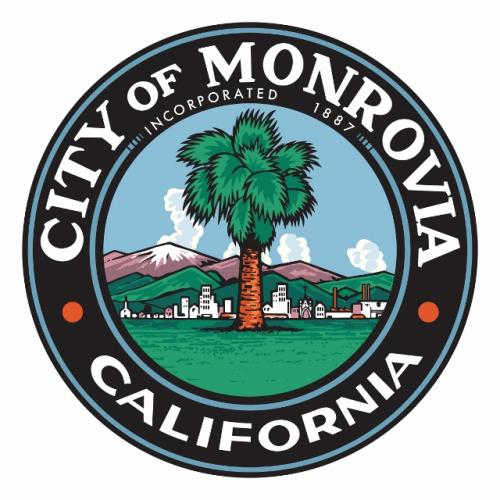
- Flag Seal
- Interactive map of Monrovia, California
- Location in the United States
- Coordinates: 34°8′45.28″N 118°0′3.42″W
- Country: United States
- State: California
- County: Los Angeles
- Incorporated: December 15, 1887

Government
  - Type: Council-Manager
  - Mayor: Becky A. Shevlin
  - Mayor Pro Tem: Dr. Tamala P. Kelly
  - City Council: Larry Spicer; Sergio Jimenez; Edward Belden
  - City Manager: Dylan Feik
  - City Treasurer: Janet Wall

Area
  - Total: 13.74 sq mi (35.59 km^{2})
  - Land: 13.63 sq mi (35.31 km^{2})
  - Water: 0.11 sq mi (0.28 km^{2}) 0.79%
- Elevation: 571 ft (174 m)

Population (2020)
  - Total: 37,931
  - Density: 2,782/sq mi (1,074.2/km^{2})
- Time zone: UTC−8 (PST)
  - Summer (DST): UTC−7 (PDT)
- ZIP Codes: 91016–91017
- Area code: 626
- FIPS code: 06-48648
- GNIS feature ID: 1661049
- Website: monroviaca.gov

Monrovia is a city in the foothills of the San Gabriel Mountains in the San Gabriel Valley of Los Angeles County, California, United States. Monrovia is the fourth-oldest general-law city in Los Angeles County and the L.A. Basin (after Los Angeles, Santa Monica, and Pasadena, all now charter cities). Incorporated in 1887, it has grown from a sparse community of orange ranches to a residential community of over 37,000. The population was 37,931 at the 2020 census.

== History ==
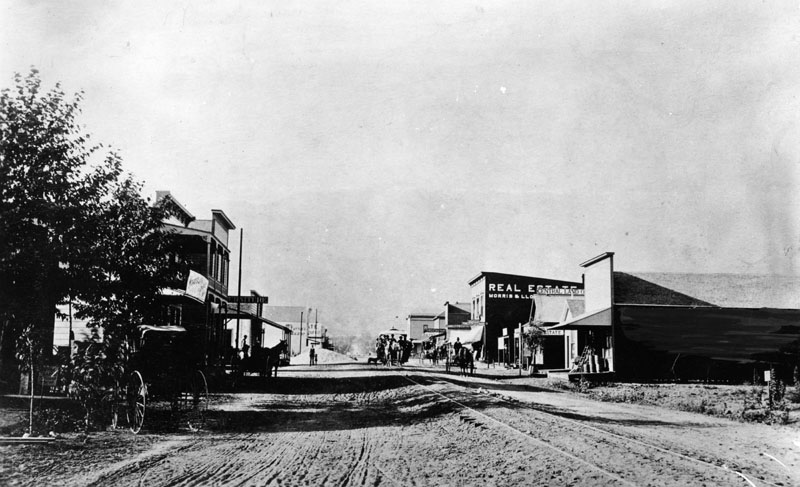
Monrovia, 1886 (Myrtle Avenue, looking north)

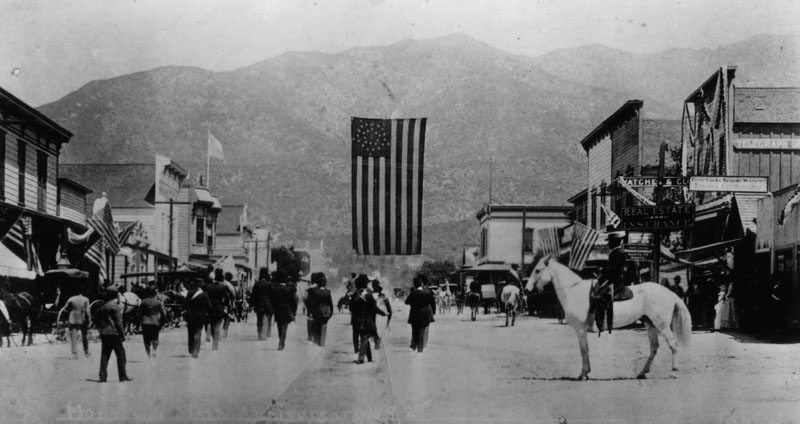
Monrovia, 1892 (Myrtle Avenue, looking north)

The San Gabriel Valley was first inhabited by the Tongva whose traditional lands extended throughout the area of modern-day greater Los Angeles. While Juan Rodríguez Cabrillo first discovered California for Spain in 1542, Spanish colonization did not begin until 1769 with the Portolá expedition. In 1771, the entire valley, including present-day Monrovia, came under the domain of the newly established Mission San Gabriel, initially located along the San Gabriel River near the southern edge of the valley. The mission utilized the lower portion of the valley for raising cattle and farming while the uplands, including Monrovia, remained untouched.

Following Mexico's independence from Spain and the Mexican Congress's enactment of secularization laws in 1833, the government of Alta California began the process of secularizing missions and dispersing their property. On April 16, 1841, Hugo Reid, a naturalized Mexican citizen from Great Britain, was provisionally granted ownership of Rancho Santa Anita, which included most of present-day Monrovia to the west of Norumbega Drive, and received a fee simple title to the land in 1845. Rancho Santa Anita then changed hands several times before Lucky Baldwin acquired it on April 8, 1875. In 1884, William N. Monroe purchased a 120-acre plot from Baldwin in present-day Monrovia that encompassed both sides of White Oak Avenue (now Foothill Boulevard). Monroe acquired an additional 90 acres in 1885.

In 1886, Monroe partnered with Edward F. Spence, John D. Bicknell, and James F. Crank to form a 120-acre town centered around Myrtle Avenue and present-day Colorado Boulevard; the first sale of townsite lots began on May 17, 1886. Within nineteen months, several banks, hotels, churches, and schools were built. In 1887, Monrovia reached a population of 500 and was incorporated on December 15, making it the fourth incorporated city in Los Angeles County after Los Angeles, Santa Monica, and Pasadena. Monrovia was connected to Los Angeles by rail in 1888 through the efforts of the San Gabriel Valley Rapid Transit Railroad Company. The Los Angeles Terminal Railway briefly assumed control over the rail line in 1892 before selling the railway to Southern Pacific in 1893.

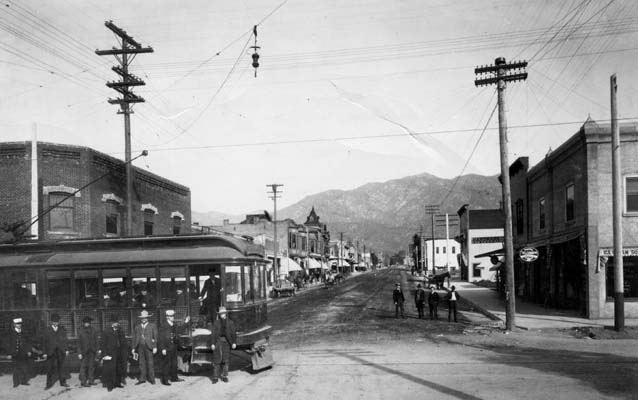
Pacific Electric in Monrovia, 1903

In 1903, the Pacific Electric railway opened a line to Monrovia. The expansion of this interurban railway, which served the greater Los Angeles area, allowed residents to visit the beach for the day, commute to downtown Los Angeles, and travel the region. It also contributed to Monrovia's growth with the population nearly tripling over a decade to 3,576 in 1910. After construction stagnated during World War I, it increased in the post-war years with a record number of building permits being issued in 1923. From 1920 to 1930, Monrovia's population increased from 5,480 to 10,890.

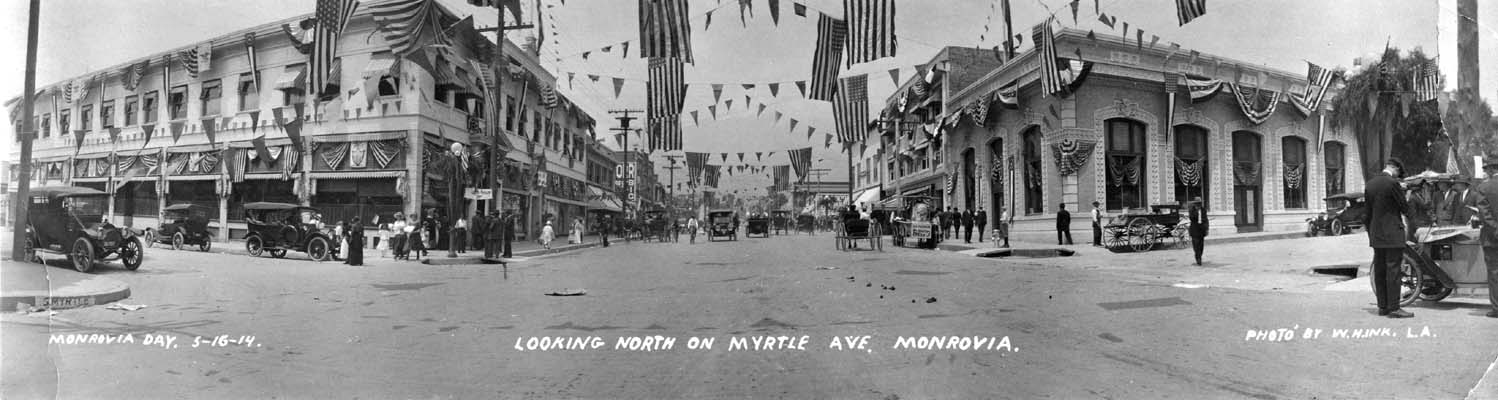
Monrovia, 1914 (Myrtle Avenue, looking north)

In 1905, Carnegie funds became available and, with the help of the Board of Trade (forerunner to the Chamber of Commerce) and the Monrovia Women's Club, a bond issue was passed to purchase the Granite Bank Building to be used as a city hall, and to acquire property for a public park. The Granite Building has served as the city hall, fire and police department facilities since 1961 and the fire department since 1974. In 1956, the old Carnegie library building was torn down and a new library was constructed. In March 2007, a new library was voted on by the people of Monrovia. It won with 70% yes votes. The library now has 190,000 books, a heritage room for historical documents, and areas for children, teens, and adults.

A city council–manager type government was instituted in 1923.

In 1930, the Monrovia Airport, also known as the Foothill Flying Club, was commercially established. The small airstrip claimed to have had 12,000 paying customers use the airfield in 1932 and on May 19, 1938, the first airmail flight took off from Monrovia Airport. Ownership of the airport changed hands several times while it was in operation; pilots remembered it as "the friendliest little airport in the country." Apart from usage by Riley Brothers, TWA Captain and former airshow pilot Kalman Irwin, and Pancho Barnes, the airfield is well known for its use as a movie-filming location. The first movie filmed at the Monrovia Airport was The Fighting Pilot. Other films shot at the airfield include 20,000 Men a Year, The Great Plane Robbery, and most notably, The Big Noise, featuring Laurel and Hardy. The 35-acre airfield, used as a runway as well as an airplane repair and storage service, was forced to close in 1953 after being sold to Consolidated Engineering Corporation for redevelopment as a result of increased land values.

Monrovia was the home to the precursor to McDonald's. In 1937, Patrick McDonald opened a food stand on Huntington Drive (Route 66) near the old Monrovia Airport called "The Airdrome" (hamburgers were ten cents, and all-you-can-drink orange juice was five cents); it remained there until 1940, when he and his two sons, Maurice and Richard, moved the building 40 miles (64 km) east to San Bernardino to the corner of West 14th Street and 1398 North E Street, renaming it "McDonald's".

In 1995, Monrovia received the All America City Award from the National Civic League.

== Geography and ecology ==
According to the United States Census Bureau, the city has an area of 35.5 square kilometers (13.7 mi^{2}), of which 13.6 square miles (35 km^{2}) is land and 0.1 square miles (0.26 km^{2}) (0.79%) is water.

Wildlife is abundant in the adjacent San Gabriel Mountains, including mammals like black bears, bobcats, coyotes, gray foxes, mountain lions(although seen much less frequently than other wildlife), and mule deer, many of which roam area neighborhoods and visit backyards. In 2024, a mother black bear and her young cubs began regularly visiting a home in Monrovia situated close to the mountains to cool-off and play in the property's swimming pool. By May, the bear family had become such regular visitors, with the homeowners posting numerous videos online, that it was reported on by multiple local, national and international news outlets, including Sky News Australia. Her story is somewhat similar to that of "Samson the Hot Tub Bear" who lived in Monrovia during the late 20th century.

=== Surrounding areas ===
unincorporated Los Angeles County
unincorporated Los Angeles County Duarte
Arcadia Bradbury
Arcadia Duarte
Mayflower Village / South Monrovia Island

== Demographics ==
Historical population
Census	Pop.	Note	%±
1890	907		—
1900	1,205		32.9%
1910	3,576		196.8%
1920	5,480		53.2%
1930	10,890		98.7%
1940	12,807		17.6%
1950	20,186		57.6%
1960	27,079		34.1%
1970	30,562		12.9%
1980	30,531		−0.1%
1990	35,761		17.1%
2000	36,929		3.3%
2010	36,590		−0.9%
2020	37,931		3.7%
U.S. Decennial Census; 1860–1870 1880–1890; 1900 1910 1920; 1930 1940 1950; 1960 1970 1980; 1990 2000 2010; 2020

Monrovia first appeared as a town in the 1890 U.S. Census; and as a city in the 1900 U.S. Census.

=== Racial and ethnic composition ===
Monrovia city, California – Racial and ethnic composition Note: the US Census treats Hispanic/Latino as an ethnic category. This table excludes Latinos from the racial categories and assigns them to a separate category. Hispanics/Latinos may be of any race.
Race / Ethnicity (NH = Non-Hispanic)	Pop 1980	Pop 1990	Pop 2000	Pop 2010	Pop 2020	% 1980	% 1990	% 2000	% 2010	% 2020
White alone (NH)	21,048	20,409	17,211	15,023	12,903	68.94%	57.07%	46.61%	41.06%	34.02%
Black or African American alone (NH)	2,841	3,443	3,074	2,346	1,955	9.31%	9.63%	8.32%	6.41%	5.15%
Native American or Alaska Native alone (NH)	254	137	133	89	66	0.83%	0.38%	0.36%	0.24%	0.17%
Asian alone (NH)	780	1,530	2,531	3,997	6,210	2.55%	4.28%	6.85%	10.92%	16.37%
Native Hawaiian or Pacific Islander alone (NH)	780	1,530	34	69	30	2.55%	4.28%	0.09%	0.19%	0.08%
Other race alone (NH)	9	65	73	93	227	0.03%	0.18%	0.20%	0.25%	0.60%
Mixed race or Multiracial (NH)	x	x	861	930	1,553	x	x	2.33%	2.54%	4.09%
Hispanic or Latino (any race)	5,599	10,177	13,012	14,043	14,987	18.34%	28.46%	35.24%	38.38%	39.51%
Total	30,531	35,761	36,929	36,590	37,931	100.00%	100.00%	100.00%	100.00%	100.00%

=== 2020 census ===
As of the 2020 census, Monrovia had a population of 37,931 and a population density of 2,782.5 inhabitants per square mile (1,074.3/km^{2}).

The age distribution was 19.4% under the age of 18, 7.8% aged 18 to 24, 29.1% aged 25 to 44, 27.9% aged 45 to 64, and 15.8% aged 65 or older. The median age was 40.5 years. For every 100 females, there were 91.3 males, and for every 100 females age 18 and over there were 88.3 males age 18 and over.

The census reported that 99.4% of the population lived in households, 0.4% lived in non-institutionalized group quarters, and 0.2% were institutionalized. There were 14,556 households, of which 30.5% had children under the age of 18 living in them. Of all households, 45.6% were married-couple households, 6.6% were cohabiting couple households, 30.2% were households with a female householder and no spouse or partner present, and 17.6% were households with a male householder and no spouse or partner present. About 26.4% of households were one person households, 10.6% had someone living alone who was 65 years of age or older, and the average household size was 2.59. There were 9,635 families (66.2% of all households).

There were 15,241 housing units at an average density of 1,118.0 units per square mile (431.7 units/km^{2}), of which 14,556 (95.5%) were occupied. Of occupied housing units, 46.4% were owner-occupied and 53.6% were occupied by renters. The homeowner vacancy rate was 0.6% and the rental vacancy rate was 3.9%.

99.7% of residents lived in urban areas, while 0.3% lived in rural areas.

=== 2023 estimate ===
In 2023, the US Census Bureau estimated that the median household income was $97,083, and the per capita income was $47,622. About 7.0% of families and 10.5% of the population were below the poverty line.

=== 2010 census ===
The 2010 United States census reported that Monrovia had a population of 36,590. The population density was 2,668.1 inhabitants per square mile (1,030.2/km^{2}). The racial makeup of Monrovia was 21,932 (59.9%) White (41.1% Non-Hispanic White), 4,107 (11.2%) Asian, 2,500 (6.8%) African American, 279 (0.8%) Native American, 76 (0.2%) Pacific Islander, 5,818 (15.9%) from other races, and 1,878 (5.1%) from two or more races. Hispanic or Latino of any race were 14,043 persons (38.4%).

The census reported that 36,434 people (99.6% of the population) lived in households, 61 (0.2%) lived in non-institutionalized group quarters, and 95 (0.3%) were institutionalized.

There were 13,762 households, out of which 4,725 (34.3%) had children under the age of 18 living in them, 6,295 (45.7%) were opposite-sex married couples living together, 2,073 (15.1%) had a female householder with no husband present, 778 (5.7%) had a male householder with no wife present. There were 793 (5.8%) unmarried opposite-sex partnerships, and 131 (1.0%) same-sex married couples or partnerships. 3,649 households (26.5%) were made up of individuals, and 1,276 (9.3%) had someone living alone who was 65 years of age or older. The average household size was 2.65. There were 9,146 families (66.5% of all households); the average family size was 3.24.

The population was spread out, with 8,514 people (23.3%) under the age of 18, 3,084 people (8.4%) aged 18 to 24, 10,733 people (29.3%) aged 25 to 44, 10,018 people (27.4%) aged 45 to 64, and 4,241 people (11.6%) who were 65 years of age or older. The median age was 37.9 years. For every 100 females, there were 91.6 males. For every 100 females age 18 and over, there were 87.0 males.

There were 14,473 housing units at an average density of 1,055.4 units per square mile (407.5 units/km^{2}), of which 6,809 (49.5%) were owner-occupied, and 6,953 (50.5%) were occupied by renters. The homeowner vacancy rate was 1.3%; the rental vacancy rate was 4.9%. 18,478 people (50.5% of the population) lived in owner-occupied housing units and 17,956 people (49.1%) lived in rental housing units.

According to the 2010 United States census, Monrovia had a median household income of $71,768, with 9.8% of the population living below the federal poverty line.

=== Mapping L.A. ===
Mapping L.A. reported that in 2000, Mexican (27.0%) and German (7.9%) were the most common ancestries. Mexico (48.1%) and the Philippines (8.6%) were the most common foreign places of birth.

== Economy ==
Original Tommy's, Trader Joe's, Green Dot and Naked Juice are based in Monrovia. Monrovia has a "Technology Corridor", which includes AeroVironment, Tanner Research, Parasoft, Xencor, and ITT Deep Space Division.

=== Top employers ===
According to the city's 2021 Annual Comprehensive Financial Report, the top employers in the city are:

#	Employer	# of employees
1	Monrovia Unified School District	724
2	Trader Joe's	341
3	STAAR Surgical	254
4	Sierra Autocars	244
5	City of Monrovia	238
6	WorleyParsons	218
7	Home Depot	209
8	Ducommun	182
9	Vinyl Technology	179
10	Amada Myachi America	164

== Arts and culture ==
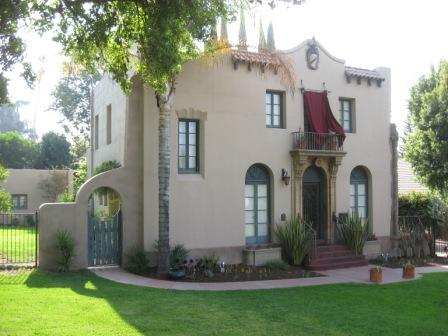
Upton Sinclair House

Upton Sinclair House, home to author Upton Sinclair, is in Monrovia and is a National Historic Landmark.

== Government ==
In the California State Legislature, Monrovia is in the 25th senatorial district, represented by Democrat Sasha Renée Pérez, and in the 41st Assembly district, represented by Democrat John Harabedian. A small portion of the city is in the 48th Assembly district, represented by Democrat Blanca Rubio.

In the United States House of Representatives, Monrovia is mostly within California's 31st congressional district, represented by Democrat Gil Cisneros with a small portion of the city in California's 28th congressional district, represented by Democrat Judy Chu.

== Education ==
=== Public schools ===
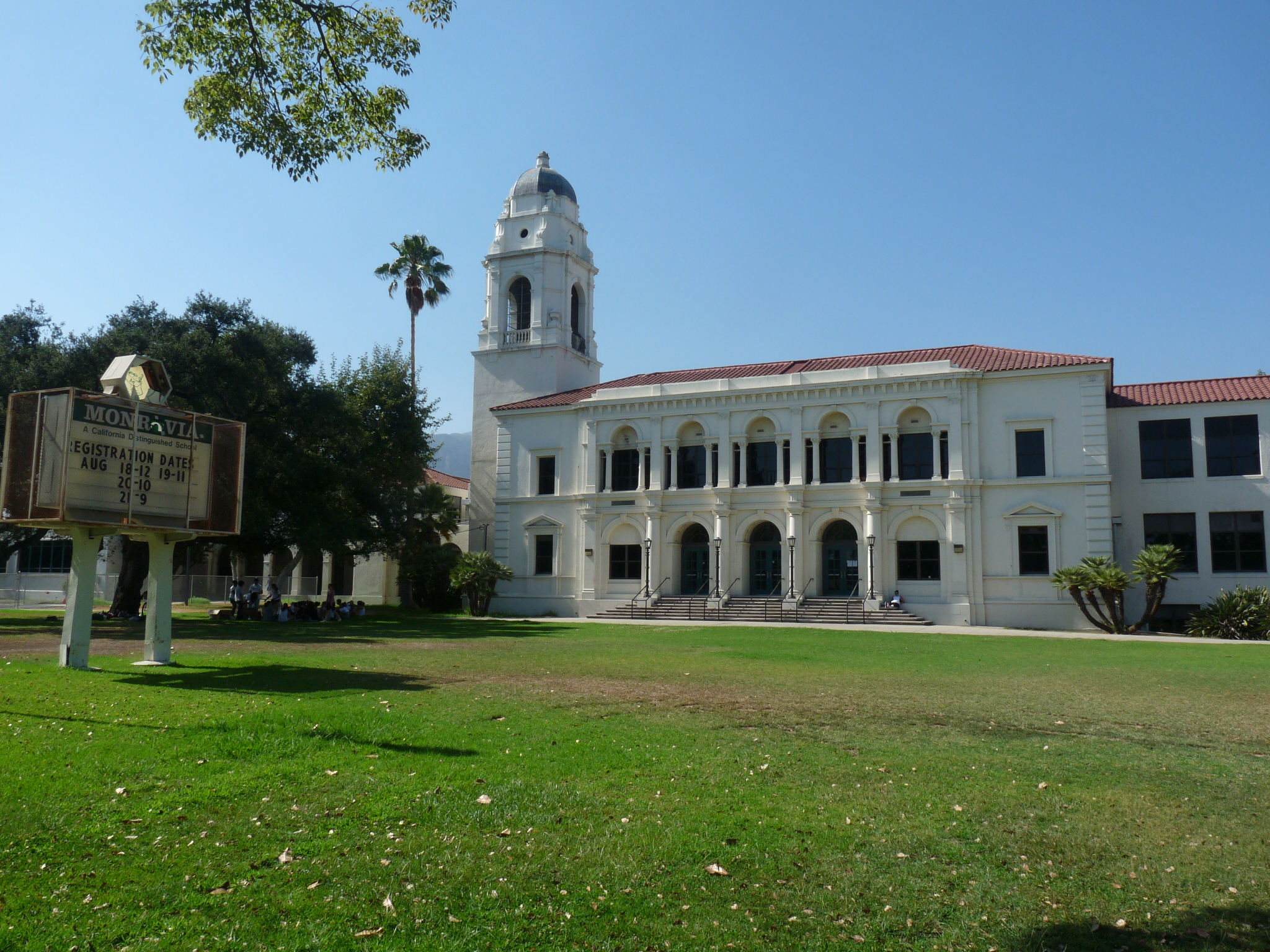
Monrovia High School

The Monrovia Unified School District operates 12 public schools, consisting of 5 elementary schools, 2 middle schools, 1 alternative school, 1 independent study school, and 1 adult school:

=== Preschools (Pre-K) ===
- Canyon Early Learning Center

=== Elementary schools (TK–6th) ===
- Bradoaks Elementary Science Academy
- Mayflower Elementary School
- Monroe Elementary School
- Plymouth Elementary School
- Wildrose School of Creative Arts

=== Middle schools (7th–8th) ===
- Clifton Middle School
- Santa Fe Computer Science Magnet School

=== High schools (9th–12th) ===
- Monrovia High School (MHS)

=== Alternative schools (7th–12th) ===
- Canyon Oaks High School

=== Independent-study schools (K–12th) ===
- Mountain Park School

=== Adult schools ===
- Monrovia Community Adult School

=== Colleges and universities ===
The city is a part of the Citrus Community College District.

== Media ==
Newspapers with offices in Monrovia include the San Gabriel Valley Tribune, which publishes community news, and Monrovia Weekly, a community newspaper. Public access television is provided by KGEM-TV, which is available primarily to cable viewers, with some content online.

== Infrastructure ==
=== Transportation ===
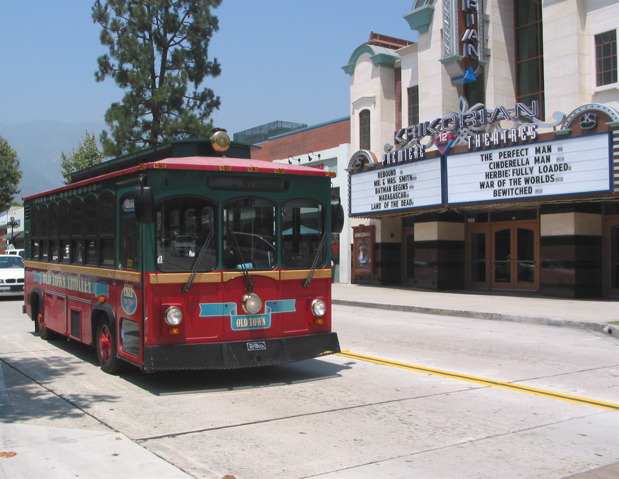
Monrovia Trolley Bus in front of the Krikorian Theater (2005)

Monrovia's main roads include Foothill Boulevard and Huntington Drive (historic Route 66). It is also served by the Foothill Freeway (I-210).

In 2016, Metro opened a new at-grade light rail station in Monrovia, Monrovia station, at the intersection of Myrtle Avenue and Duarte Road. It is served by the Metro A Line. It is at the location of the former Santa Fe Depot, which still stands.

=== Health care ===
The Los Angeles County Department of Health Services operates the Monrovia Health Center in Monrovia.

== Notable people ==
- Eleanor Abbott, game designer known for Candy Land
- Allen Allensworth, American chaplain, colonel, and founder of Allensworth, Tulare County
- Kenny Baker, singer and actor
- Corie Blount, basketball player, Los Angeles Lakers, Chicago Bulls
- Cisco Carlos, Major League Baseball pitcher
- Jason Earles, actor
- Mary Ford, vocalist and guitarist
- Jim Fuller, guitarist for The Surfaris (of "Wipeout" fame)
- Prince Gomolvilas, playwright
- Dean R. Hirsch, president of World Vision International
- Ernie Johnson, former baseball player and member of the New York Yankees first World Series championship team 1923
- Ian Johnson, American football player
- Katie Johnson, Mexican-American soccer player for the San Diego Wave in the NWSL
- Anna H. Jones, African American educator and activist
- Kiyoshi Kuromiya, gay rights activist
- Ellis McCarthy, defensive tackle for Miami Dolphins
- Corky King, founder of Summum
- Scott Land, puppeteer/actor
- Don Mankiewicz, screenwriter and novelist
- Francis M. Pottenger, Jr., nutrition researcher
- Kim Rhode, three-time Olympic gold medalist (six medals total) in trap and skeet shooting
- Marissa Roy, attorney and politician
- Ashley Sanchez, professional soccer player for the Washington Spirit in the NWSL
- Thomas J. Sargent, 2011 Nobel Prize in Economics, graduated from Monrovia High School in 1961
- Upton Sinclair and Mary Craig Sinclair, authors and producers
- Jacob Smith, actor
- William A. Spinks (1865–1933), champion carom billiards pro, co-inventor of modern billiards cue chalk, oil investor, and flower and avocado farmer (developer of the Spinks avocado cultivar); also maintained home and farm in nearby Duarte
- Leslie Van Houten, Monrovia High School graduate, Charles Manson follower
- Henry B. Walthall (1878–1936), actor
- The Fabulous Wonder Twins, entertainers

== In popular culture ==
- The house seen in the 1986 horror-comedy cult film House is at 329 Melrose Avenue in Monrovia.
- The exterior house seen in the 2018 post-apocalyptic horror thriller film Bird Box, which was streamed worldwide on Netflix, is at 304 North Canyon Boulevard and the corner of East Greystone Avenue in Monrovia.
- Miranda July's novel All Fours is set in large part in a Monrovia motel.
- The 1997 feature film Eight Days a Week was entirely shot on location in Monrovia.

== See also ==
- Baseball Reliquary
