= Operating Manual for Spaceship Earth =

Book by Richard Buckminster Fuller

- Author: Buckminster Fuller
- Publication date: 1969
- Media type: Print

Operating Manual For Spaceship Earth is a short book by R. Buckminster Fuller, first published in 1969, following an address with a similar title given to the 50th annual convention of the American Planners Association in the Shoreham Hotel, Washington D.C., on 16 October 1967.

The book relates Earth to a spaceship flying through space. Noting the lack of any user manual to help Earthians steward this ship, Fuller offers some reflections, prognostications, and guidance, based on contemporary concepts of linked relationships, that may help in the understanding, management, sustainment, and creation of a plan to preserve spaceship earth for the future of humanity. The spaceship has a finite amount of resources and cannot be resupplied.

== Chapters ==
- Comprehensive propensities
- Origins of specialization
- Comprehensively commanded automation
- Spaceship Earth
- General systems theory
- Synergy
- Integral functions
- The regenerative landscape

== Main themes ==
=== History ===
Fuller describes two epochs within modern and contemporary history.

The first epoch was one run by "Great Pirates" or "great outlaws." The source of their power is that they are the only masters of global information in a time where people are focused locally. They were aware that resources weren't evenly distributed around the world, so that items which are abundant in one area are scarce in another. This gives rise to trade which the Great Pirates exploit for their own advantage. They established sea-trade routes to connect previously isolated populations throughout the globe. As these people took to the sea they left the local, regional laws of their original communities and entered a transitional space where they invented their own laws based on their interests in retaining special access to the Earth's dispersed resources and to gaining power through trade. The Great Pirates had a special ability to comprehend and activate a wide range of skills and knowledges required to generalize, translate, navigate, and integrate existing systems.

Fuller posits that these Great Pirates established governments in various areas and supported leaders who will defend their trade routes. By providing the leaders with special access to global resources, the Great Pirates controlled regional politicians, military, and leaders; these puppet leaders served the role of facilitating the Great Pirates' work, and in exchange for providing the Great Pirates with special privileges the Great Pirates would reward them with a cut of their profits. This historical era found a vast increase in the circulation and advancements of tools, goods, and services.

Power struggles for waterways ensue, requiring people such as Leonardo da Vinci and Michelangelo to design better defenses for the Great Pirates. As engineers become involved with the Great Pirates many new concepts appear, but the main one was of the Navy. As the size of the people in the Great Pirates' employment grow, training becomes a necessity, and the beginnings of schools and colleges ensue. Monarchs are encouraged to develop civil service systems to provide secure but specialized employment for their brightest subjects, which prevents them from competing with the Great Pirates in their lucrative global trading. Thus the Great Pirates guarded the advantages that their unique global perspective revealed.

This previous epoch set in place the current system of political organization rooted in the concept of sovereign nations which control the planet's natural resources and distribution networks. Fuller describes this as an outdated and illogical structure. This structure is based on colonization, imposing servility on anyone born outside of the borders of the privileged nations, and installing "identity classification" based on race, birth-nation, and citizenship as a status quo, and encouraging competitive ideologies based on politics, science, and religion.

Fuller describes that these separate sovereign nations with their competitive identities led to World War I and continued through World War II. World War I emerged from the struggle between the 'out-pirates' (electronic and chemical warfare) and the 'in-pirates' (electromagnetics). This change from the visible to the invisible forced the Great Pirates to rely on experts, which causes the end of the Great Pirates (who previously had been the only ones that were truly multi-disciplined). The public is unaware that Great Pirates had been ruling the earth, and the role falls back to kings and politicians, though the frameworks of trade, rating and accounting remain. Fuller declares that the Great Pirates society became extinct as a result of advances in industrial production and technology. Yet the systems that they had created were not altered. National leaders assumed the role of the Great Pirates, without having the necessary skills and experiences of a generalized world view. By default they reinforced the outdated systems of sovereignty.

In the current era, Fuller predicts that "planners, architects, and engineers take the initiative".

=== Education ===
==== Specializations ====
One of the strategies used by the Great Pirates to control individuals by disconnecting them from comprehending the whole picture was the concept of specializations. Schools, colleges, and intellectual associations encourage individuals to devote themselves to a specialization at a young age. Fuller describes that "specialization is... only a fancy form of slavery wherein the 'expert' is fooled into accepting his slavery by making him feel that in return he is in a socially and culturally preferred, ergo, highly secure, lifelong position." Specializations were used as a way to fragment society by dividing individuals into only having one place in society, and to discourage them from understanding how their job relates to other disciplines and feeds into the larger picture. This form of control is used to limit one's experience, knowledge, focus, viewpoint, and network within only one segment, subservient to their specific organized societies. Specialists are discouraged from comprehension; Wide-ranging ambitions that span across larger networks, and are controlled by their superiors. Specialization is described as a loss of general adaptability, and leads to extinction.

==== Life fellowship ====
Since many jobs will be replaced by automation, and the sustainability of human life would no longer be dictated by labor, humans could be free to engage in other pursuits. To realize potential wealth each person who is or becomes unemployed should be provided with a life fellowship in research and development, or just simply have the freedom to experience and experiment. Fuller states that for every 100,000 fellowships given out one person will come up with something so valuable that it will pay for the remaining 99,999 fellowships.

=== Economics ===
The economic accounting systems that are most widely in use only measure physical matter, which is only actually one quality of wealth.

==== Access to vital resources ====
Fuller critiques the prevalence of poverty throughout the entire publication. He states that one of the qualities that make humans unique is their inventiveness. Human inventiveness is driven by curiosity, desire to communicate, adaptability, resourcefulness, and intellectual capabilities. Poverty injures all of Earth's population, by limiting a large percentage of the population's ability to realize their potential and engage in the furthering and betterment of the world's population. So far many of the solutions activated have been short-sighted and superficial, aimed at removing poverty from view.

It is also an outdated concept that tries to dictate which people are allowed to live the fullest lifespan possible.

==== Wealth ====
Energy cannot be created or destroyed, it is only ever transformed. Thus the concept that energy is "spent" and that the universe could run out of energy is outdated. There is a finite amount of energy available to us that lives within a closed system where it cannot be expended with. The concepts of "spending" energy and of entropy are used to support outdated systems of thought which believe that in order for one group of lifeforms to survive, others must be made extinct.

Fuller argues instead that "Wealth is the product of the progressive mastery of matter by the mind." Wealth is rather better defined as the potential that one has to survive.

There is enough wealth in the world to satisfy all of the world's needs.

==== Industry ====
Contemporary industry requires the coordination of international networks and access to global resources.

=== Technology ===
Defines tools as either craft tools that can be invented by one man, such as bows and arrows, and industrial tools that cannot be produced by one man, such as the S.S. Queen Mary. Finds language to be the first industrial tool. States that craft tools were used to create industrial tools.

==== Automation ====
The new technology of the computer allows the computer to specialize and allow humans to overcome their former roles, as specialists and laborers, and gain freedom to focus instead on their special abilities to comprehend and invent.

Fuller acknowledges that one of the largest critiques against automation comes from humans themselves, who fear the loss of their livelihoods, and thus their lives. This issue is easily solved through universal basic income.

==== Communication ====
Humans are uniquely driven by the desire to communicate. New technologies will enhance our ability to develop and strengthen connections.

=== Ecology ===
One of the keys to survival of the human species involves further understanding of how to sustain life through managing energy in sustainable ways. The idea of the Earth as a spaceship alludes to it as a mechanical vehicle that requires maintenance, and that if we do not keep it in good order it will cease to function. Fuller critiques the pollution of air, water, and information as counter to survival.

==== Fossil fuels ====
Throughout this book Fuller heavily critiques the continued use of fossil fuels. Our scientific understanding of the planet Earth has taught us that not only is the continued use of fossil fuels unsustainable, it is self-destructive as well. Additionally, Fuller refers to fossil fuels as our savings account; if we burn through the finite amount available rather than reserving it, our energy potential will only become bankrupt.

He encourages instead the harvesting of regenerative sources, specifically the Sun's radiation and Moon's gravity via wind, solar, and water tools. Fuller states that we "must operate exclusively on our vast daily energy income from the powers of wind, tide, water, and the direct Sun radiation energy".

=== Systems theory ===
It is not possible to identify the whole of the system through only analyzing its parts.

==== Synergy ====
Fuller describes synergy as the "behavior of whole systems unpredicted by the separately observed behaviors of any of the system's separate parts or any sub-assembly of the systems' parts."

== See also ==
- Spaceship Earth
- Critical Path (book)

== Reading links ==
- Fuller, Buckminster (2020) [1969]. Operating Manual for Spaceship Earth. Zurich, Switzerland: Lars Müller Publishers. ISBN 978-3-0377-8126-5.
