= Monrovia Unified School District =

School district in California

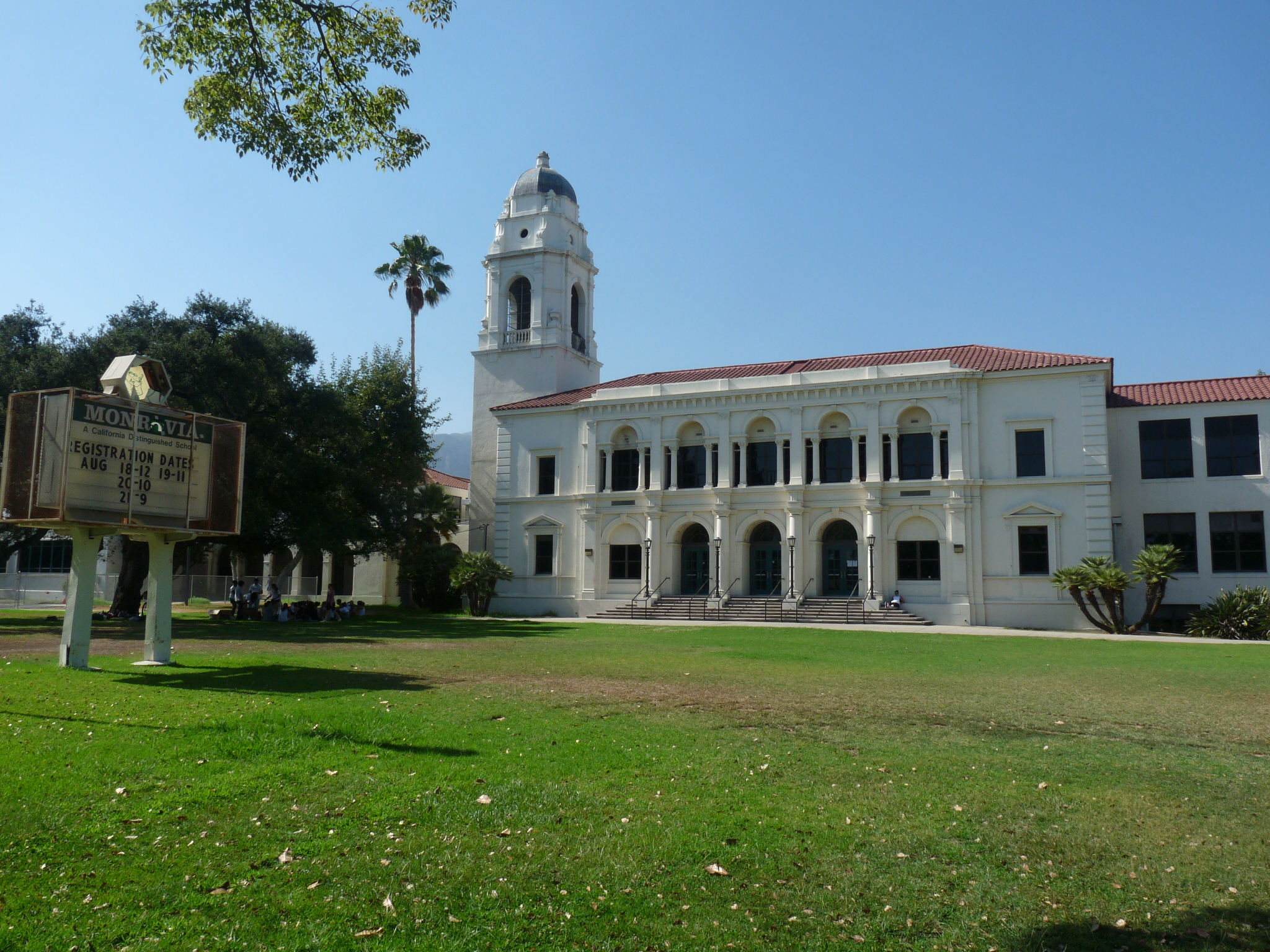
- Monrovia High School
- District Office; 325 East Huntington Dr, Monrovia, CA 91016

District information
- Grades: Preschool-Adult
- Established: 1894
- Superintendent: Paula Hart Rodas
- Enrollment: 4,935 (2023–24)

Monrovia Unified School District is a school district in Los Angeles County, California. Its headquarters is in Monrovia.

The district has one early learning center, five elementary schools, two middle schools, one high school, two alternative schools, and one community adult school. As of 2023–2024 it had a total of 4,935 K-12 students and 224.76 teaching staff (on an FTE basis).

== Board of education ==
Monrovia Unified School District's Board of Education members are elected at-large and to a four-year term. The elections are held on the first Tuesday after the first Monday in November starting with the 2018 election. It is composed of five members.

== Schools ==
The school district has the following schools:

=== Preschools ===
- Canyon Early Learning Center

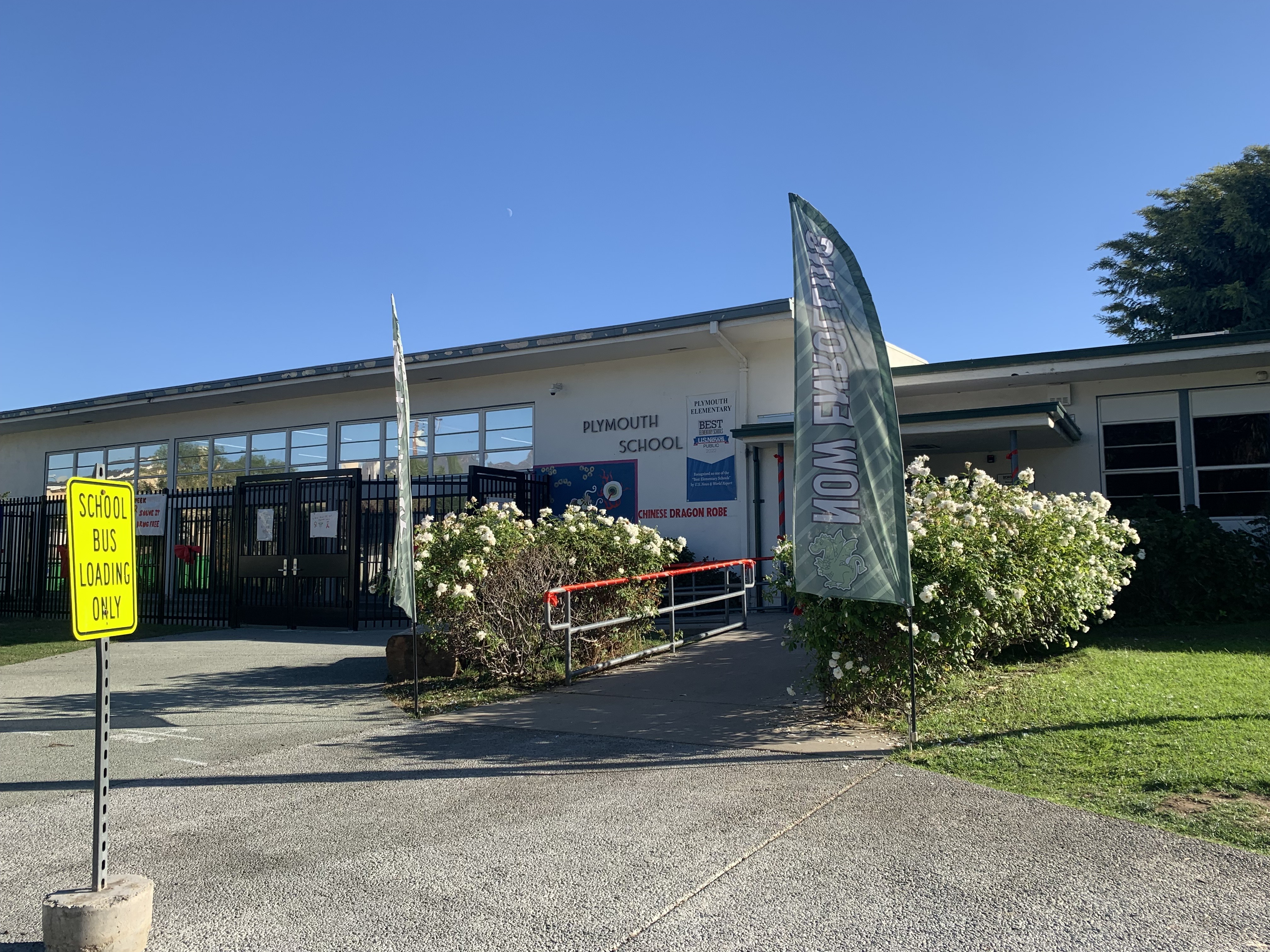
Plymouth Elementary School

=== Elementary schools (K–5) ===
- Bradoaks Elementary School
- Mayflower Elementary School
- Monroe Elementary School
- Plymouth Elementary School
- Wild Rose Elementary School

=== Middle schools (6–8) ===
- Clifton Middle School
- Santa Fe Computer Science Magnet School

=== High schools ===
- Monrovia High School

=== Alternative schools ===
- Canyon Oaks High School
- Mountain Park School (K-12)

=== Adult schools ===
- Monrovia Community Adult School
