= Old Man River's City project =

Coordinates: 38.6347°N 90.1701°W

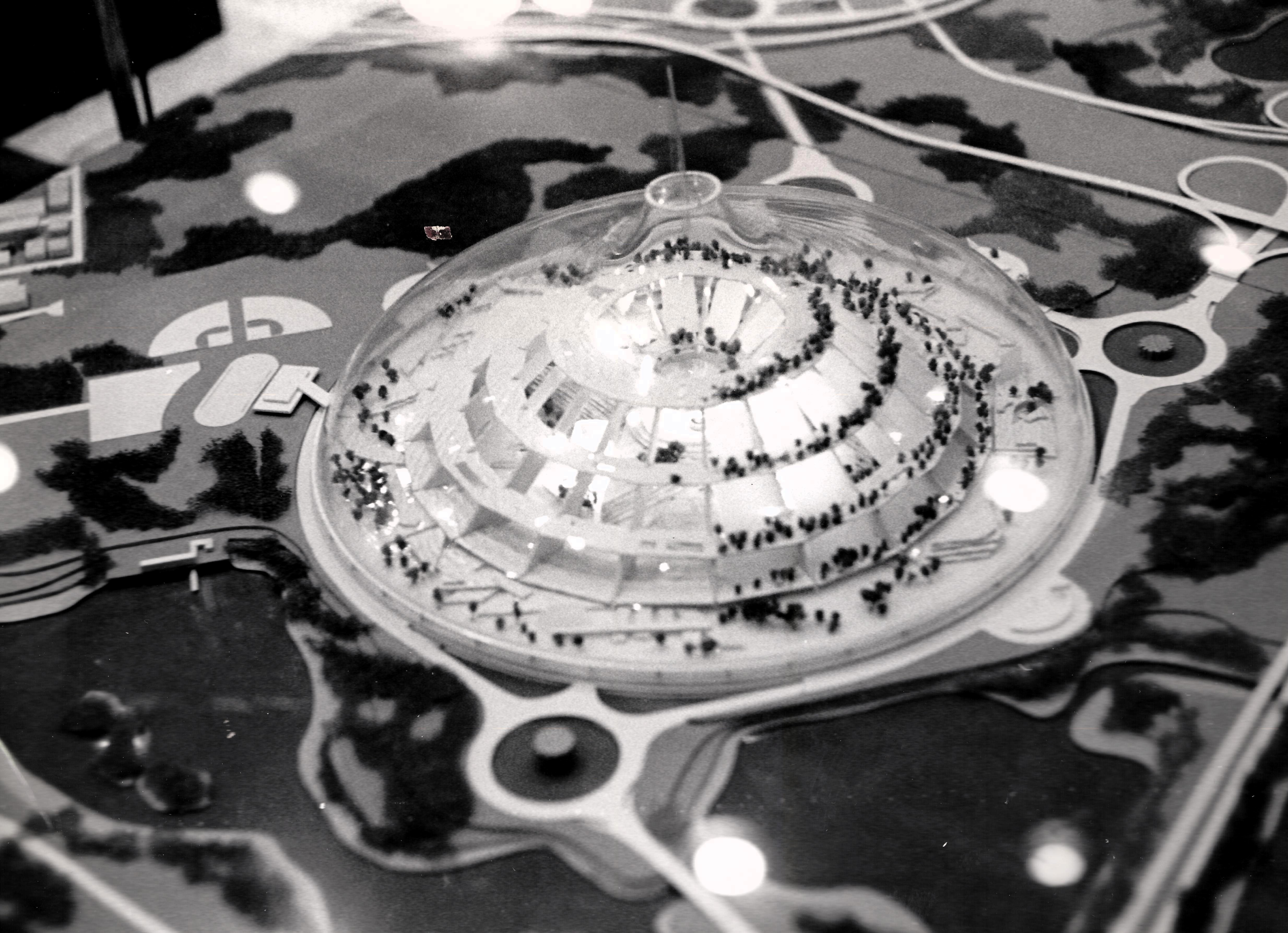
Fuller's model for the city

The Old Man River's City project was an architectural design created by Buckminster Fuller in 1971. The city of East St. Louis asked Fuller to envision a massive housing project for the city's 70,000 residents. Fuller responded with a circular multi-terraced dome with about 2,500 square feet (230 m^{2}) of living space per family and a total capacity to house 125,000 occupants.

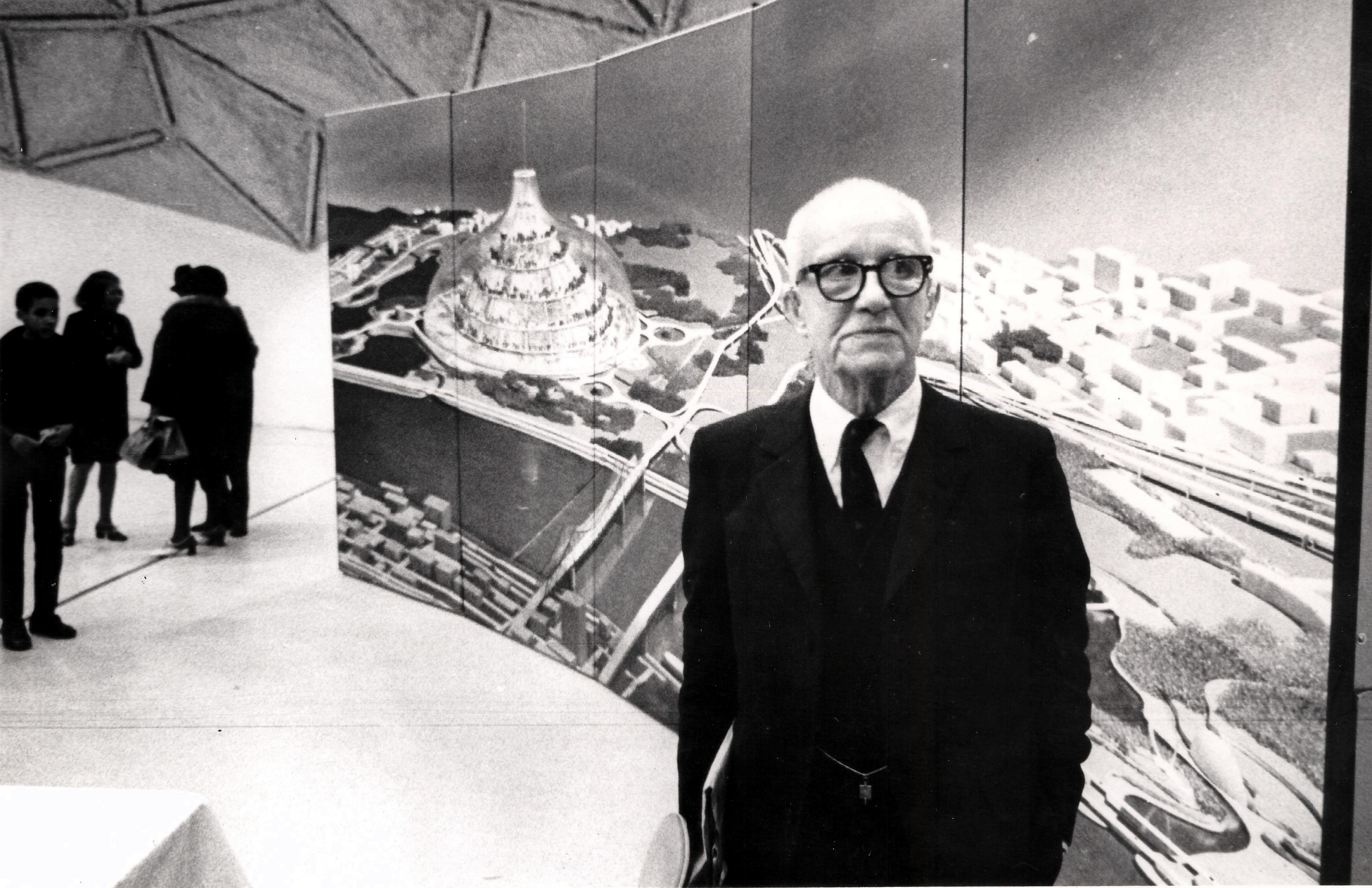
R. Buckminster Fuller stands in front of a depiction of his domed city design at its first public showing at a community meeting in East St. Louis, Illinois.

I originally came to East St. Louis to discuss the design and possible realization of the Old Man River's City, having been asked to do so by East St. Louis community leaders themselves ... It is moon-crater-shaped: the crater's truncated cone top opening is a half-mile in diameter, rim-to-rim, while the truncated mountain itself is a mile in diameter at its base ring. The city has a one-mile (1.6 km)-diameter geodesic, quarter-sphere transparent umbrella mounted high above it to permit full, all-around viewing below the umbrella's bottom perimeter. The top of the dome roof is 1,000 feet (300 m) high. The bottom rim of the umbrella dome is 500 feet (150 m) above the surrounding terrain, while the crater-top esplanade, looks 250 feet (76 m) radially inward from the umbrella's bottom, is at the same 500-foot (150 m) height. From the esplanade the truncated mountain cone slopes downwardly, inward and outward, to ground level 500 feet (150 m) below.

The moon crater's inward and outward, exterior-surface slopes each consist of fifty terraces - the terrace floors are tiered vertically ten feet above or below one another. All the inwardly, downwardly sloping sides of the moon crater's terraced cone are used for communal life; its outward-sloping, tree-planted terraces are entirely for private life dwelling.

— Buckminster Fuller, Critical Path
