= Adam Had Four Sons =

1941 film by Gregory Ratoff

- Theatrical release poster
- Directed by: Gregory Ratoff
- Screenplay by: William Hurlbut; Michael Blankfort
- Based on: the novel "Legacy" by Charles Bonner
- Produced by: Robert Sherwood
- Starring: Ingrid Bergman; Warner Baxter; Susan Hayward; Fay Wray; Helen Westley; Richard Denning; Johnny Downs; Robert Shaw
- Cinematography: Peverell Marley
- Edited by: Francis D. Lyon
- Music by: W. Franke Harling
- Production company: Columbia Pictures
- Distributed by: Columbia Pictures
- Release date: February 18, 1941 (United States)
- Running time: 81 minutes
- Country: United States
- Language: English
- Budget: $488,000 (est.)

Adam Had Four Sons is a 1941 American romantic drama film directed by Gregory Ratoff and starring Ingrid Bergman, Warner Baxter, Susan Hayward and Fay Wray.

The film is based on Charles Bonner's 1940 novel Legacy.

== Plot ==
Adam Stoddard is a wealthy man who falls on hard times after the death of his wife Molly and the stock-market crash of 1907 that eliminates his wealth. Recently arrived governess Emilie works to keep the family together, but with the loss of Adam's fortune, the boys are sent to boarding school and elderly Cousin Phillipa pays the tuition. Emilie must return to France until Adam can afford to repurchase the family estate. Adam regains his wealth over the course of several years and invites Emilie back to the estate. The three older boys serve in World War I.

Adam's son David returns with his new wife Hester, whose friendly exterior hides a duplicitous, evil woman. Cousin Phillipa senses that Hester is wicked but dies before she can tell Adam. Hester schemes to rid the home of Emilie, and seduces another son, Jack, while her husband is away at war. Emilie discovers the affair but keeps quiet to preserve Adam's happiness and Jack's reputation. When Adam sees a silhouette of a man and woman in passionate embrace in Jack's window, he demands that Jack open his door. Emilie secretly enters the room while Hester leaves, tricking Adam to believe that she is involved with Jack and keeping the adulterous secret from Adam.

After David returns from the war, an inebriated Hester inadvertently calls Jack's name while David is caressing her. Realizing her infidelity, David leaves to commit suicide by flying a plane and crashing on a stormy night. However, he survives the attempt and is hospitalized. Emilie finally snaps and angrily demands that Hester leave the home. Hester tries to tell Adam that Emilie is forcing her to leave because Emilie wishes to be the only woman of the house, but Jack tells the whole truth to Adam. Adam realizes Hester's true nature and evicts her from the home. He professes his love to Emilie and she happily accepts his offer of marriage.

== Cast ==
- Ingrid Bergman as Emilie Gallatin
- Warner Baxter as Adam Stoddard
- Susan Hayward as Hester
- Fay Wray as Molly
- Richard Denning as Jack (as a man)
- Johnny Downs as David (as a man)
- Robert Shaw as Chris (as a man)
- Charles Lind as Phillip (as a man)
- Billy Ray as Jack (as a boy)
- Steven Muller as David (as a boy)
- Wallace Chadwell as Chris (as a boy)
- Bobby Walberg as Phillip (as a boy)
- Helen Westley as Cousin Philippa
- June Lockhart as Vance
- Pietro Sosso as Otto
- Gilbert Emery as Dr. Lane
- Renie Riano as Photographer
- Clarence Muse as Sam (uncredited)
- Frank Darien as Horace (uncredited)
- Guy Usher as Constable C.E. Clark (uncredited)

== Production ==
The film's working title was that of the book upon which it is based, Legacy, but the title was changed to Adam Had Four Sons in January 1941 after producer Robert Sherwood sampled public opinion and determined that "the former title had the wrong connotations."

The screenplay significantly deviates from the book upon which it is based. In the book, Adam has five sons, he commits a murder and one of his sons commits suicide, but none of these events are included in the film.

Composer W. Franke Harling sought to create an understated musical score that "should enhance all the varied moods of the picture but never for a moment let the audience be aware of the fact."

== Release ==
Adam Had Four Sons premiered nationwide on February 18, 1941. In New York, it began its run at Radio City Music Hall on March 27, 1941, replacing Cheers for Miss Bishop, another romantic drama set in the earlier part of the century.

== Reception ==
In a contemporary review for The New York Times, critic Bosley Crowther wrote:

Columbia's "Adam Had Four Sons" is heavily charged with sentiment. It lays stress on the simple virtues and wrings the tender heart. It even is comfortably set in bygone days for nostalgic effect. ... [T]he current attraction has, at least, a weak but workable dramatic core and it is blessed with the talented Ingrid Bergman in the leading and only significant role. ... Miss Bergman, as the governess, does manage in a restrained and understanding performance to convey the devotion of a woman for the boys whom she helps to man's estate and from her alone does one catch a sincere emotional response. But Warner Baxter plays the father in a routine, surface way; none of the several young actors who play the boys stand out above the rest, and the norm lacks distinction, indeed; and Susan Hayward so coyly overacts the romantically unlicensed mischief-maker that often she is plain ridiculous. On the whole, "Adam Had Four Sons" is an antique tear-jerker—one of those dramas all dressed up in old clothes which never gets anywhere.

Edwin Schallert of the Los Angeles Times wrote a glowing review:

It is strong in casting, excellently presented, brings Ingrid Bergman back to the screen after a protracted absence and takes Warner Baxter out of the groove in a role that is exceptionally well-rendered by him. Most arresting of all, perhaps, is the work of Susan Hayward as a character that is as diabolical as any offered on the screen in ages. There really isn't a deficient performance.
