= Monrovia High School (California) =

Public school in the United States

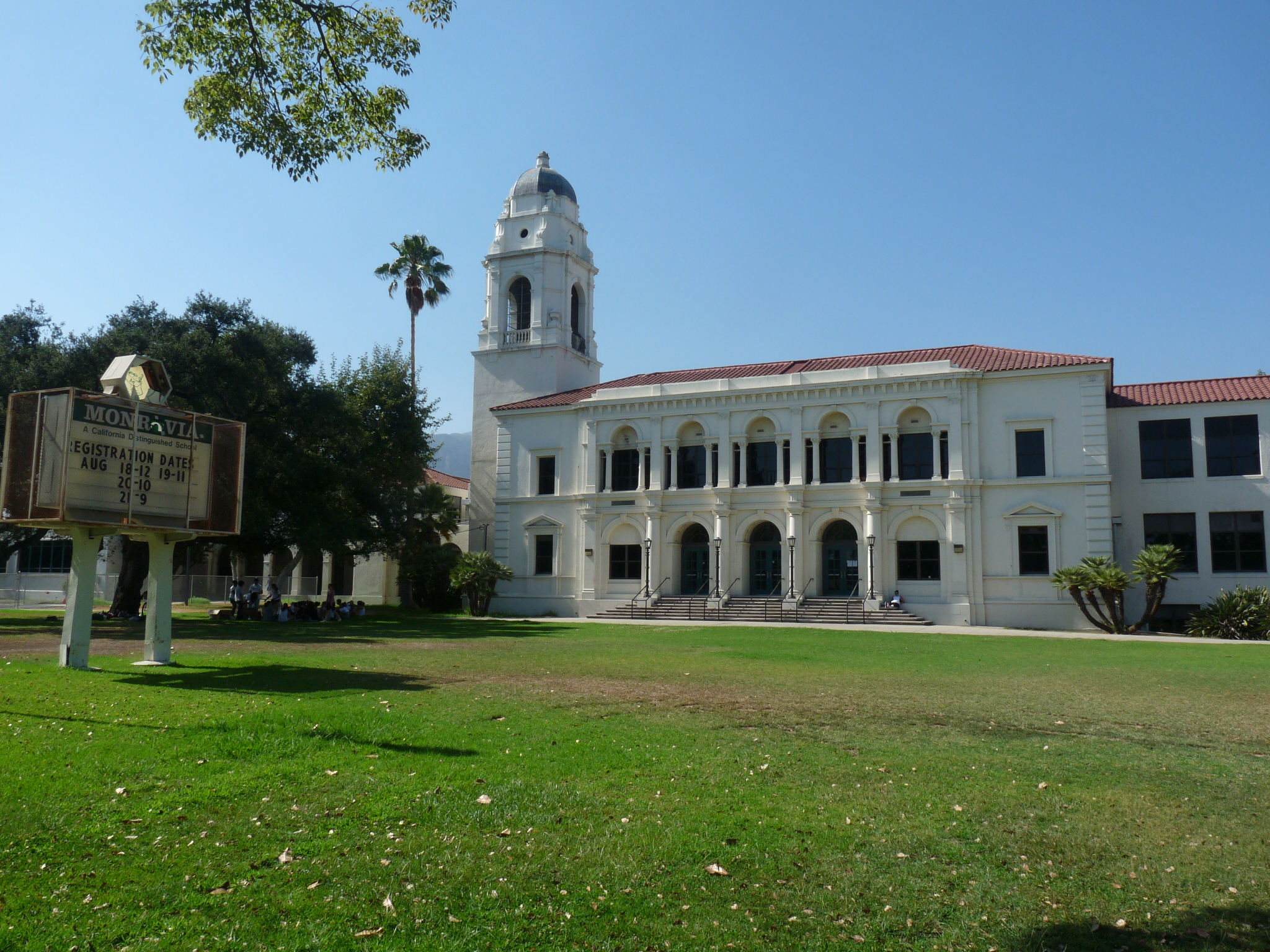

Location
- 845 West Colorado Boulevard; Monrovia, California 91016; United States; 34°08′45″N 118°01′02″W

Information
- Type: Public
- School district: Monrovia Unified School District
- Principal: Matthew Rainwater
- Staff: 63.17 (FTE)
- Grades: 9-12
- Enrollment: 1,355 (2025-2026)
- Student to teacher ratio: 23.1
- Colors: Green and White
- Athletics conference: Rio Hondo League; CIF Southern Section
- Nickname: Wildcat
- Website: https://mhs.monroviaschools.net/

Monrovia High School is a public high school located in Monrovia, California, a northeastern suburb of Los Angeles, United States. Monrovia High School is the only grades 9–12 comprehensive high school in the Monrovia Unified School District. Established in 1893, the campus is located in an environment of neo-Spanish architecture, green lawns, and hundred-year-old oak trees, and is nestled against the San Gabriel Mountains. The portion of the campus designed in 1928 is the work of noted Los Angeles architect John C. Austin.

In 2006, the citizens of Monrovia approved a $45 million bond for the high school. Major construction transformed the campus by adding a science building with technology labs, a gymnasium to support the physical education and sports programs, a stadium and bleachers, and an overall renovation of the campus. The construction was completed in 2012

== Athletics ==
- Beach Volleyball (Boys and Girls)
- Baseball (Boys)
- Basketball (Boys and Girls)
- Cheer (Coed)
- Cross Country (Boys and Girls)
- Football (Boys)
- Golf (Coed)
- Soccer (Boys and Girls)
- Softball (Girls)
- Swimming (Coed)
- Tennis (Boys and Girls)
- Track (Coed)
- Volleyball (Boys and Girls)
- Water Polo (Boys and Girls)
- Wrestling (Boys and Girls)

== Monrovia HS Wildcats Music Department ==
Monrovia High School has a Southern California School Band and Orchestra Association Division 3A band (The Monrovia Marching Wildcats), an indoor drumline, a color guard, and an orchestra. In 2018, the Marching Wildcats won 1st Place (Gold Medal) at the SCSBOA 1A Championships with their high performance of their show that year “Remix de Lune”. In 2022, the Marching Wildcats made a thunderous comeback to once again become a championship finalist band at the SCSBOA 1A Championships for the first time since 2019 placing 6th out of 12. This made it the 9th time in Monrovia High School history that the band goes to championships.

== Events ==
On October 23, 1946, the high school was the site of the fourth debate between incumbent Congressman Jerry Voorhis and his challenger, future president Richard Nixon.

In 1971, George Trapp, an alumnus of the Monrovia high school was the first-round draft pick of the Atlanta Hawks.

In 1993, Corie Blount, another alumnus of the school, was the first round draft pick of the Chicago Bulls.

On July 22, 1996, then-President Bill Clinton visited Monrovia High School and made a speech.

The school has also been the site of movie shoots including Not Another Teen Movie, A Cinderella Story, Liar Liar, Leave it to Beaver, and Drive Me Crazy. MHS was also the filming site of 976-EVIL.

== Notable alumni ==
- Donna Adamek, PWBA Hall of Fame professional bowler
- Corie Blount, NBA power forward
- Hardiman Cureton, football player
- Damon Griffin, NFL wide receiver
- Chris Hale, NFL defensive back
- Carlos Hernandez, college football wide receiver
- Kiyoshi Kuromiya, Human Rights Activist
- Damien Lawson, Awaken the Empire Singer/Songwriter
- Keith Lincoln, AFL running back
- Johnny Lindell, MLB baseball player
- Thomas J. Sargent, 2011 Nobel Prize Winner in Economics
- George Trapp, NBA power forward / center
- Leslie Van Houten, member of the Manson Family
- Kate Wiesner, soccer player
- Roy Zimmerman, NFL quarterback
