= Kiyoshi Kuromiya =

Japanese-American activist and author (1943–2000)

- Born: May 9, 1943; Heart Mountain Relocation Center, Wyoming, U.S.
- Died: May 10, 2000 (aged 57); Philadelphia, Pennsylvania, U.S.
- Education: University of Pennsylvania; Monrovia High School
- Occupations: Author, civil and social justice advocate

Kiyoshi Kuromiya (Japanese: 黒宮 清, May 9, 1943 – May 10, 2000) was a Japanese-American author and civil rights, anti-war, gay liberation, and HIV/AIDS activist. Born in Wyoming at the World War II-era Japanese American internment camp known as Heart Mountain, Kuromiya became an aide to Martin Luther King Jr. and a prominent opponent of the Vietnam War during the 1960s.

One of the founders of the Gay Liberation Front in Philadelphia, Kuromiya also founded the Critical Path Project and its newsletter. He was also the editor of ACT UP's Standard of Care, the first medical treatment and cultural competency guidelines produced for people living with HIV by people living with HIV/AIDS.

== Family and early life ==
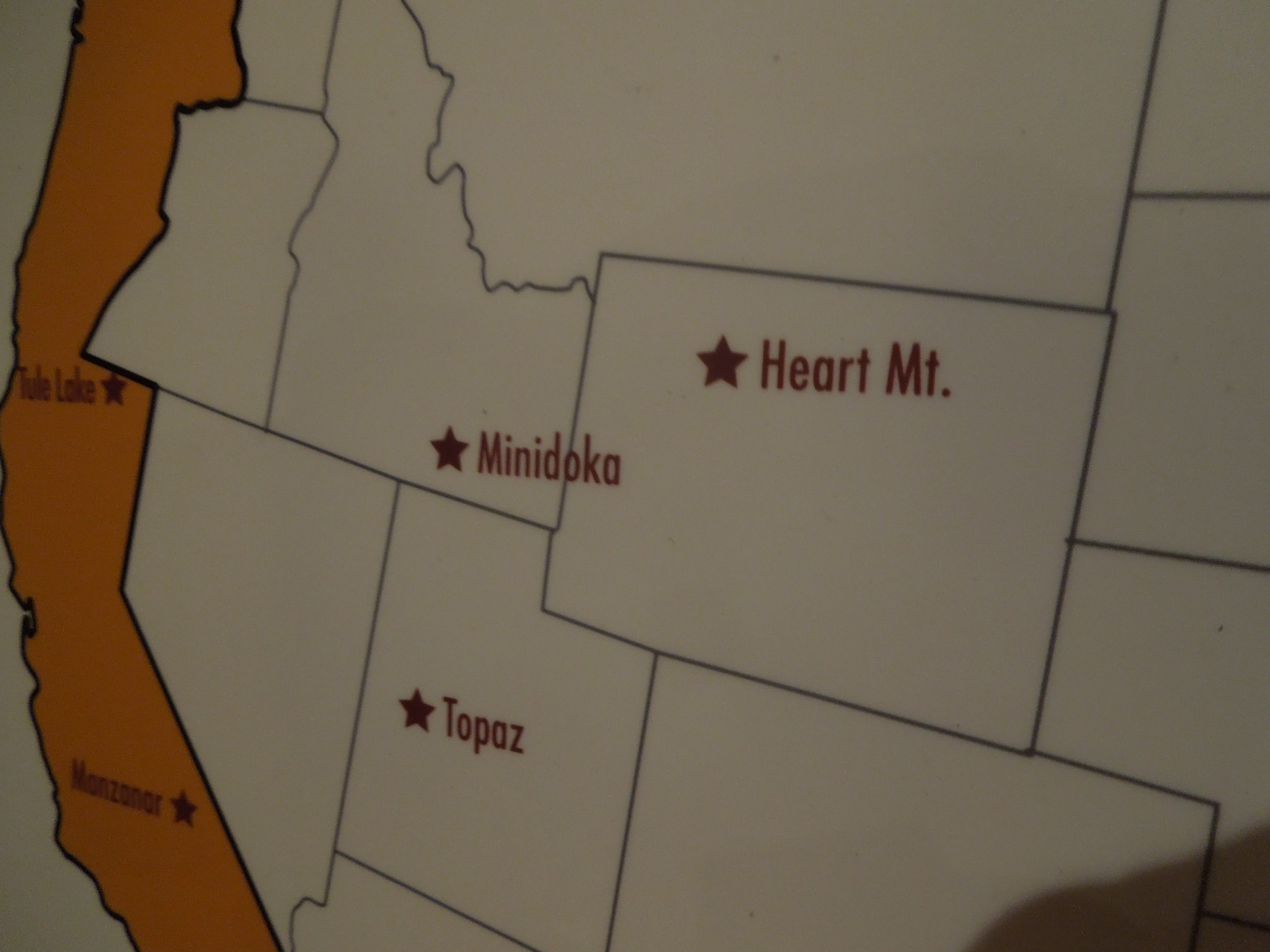
Site of the internment camp that Kuromiya's family was relocated to and where he was born

Kiyoshi Kuromiya was born on May 9, 1943, in Wyoming at the Heart Mountain Internment Camp, where his family had been relocated and detained while living in Monrovia, California, where Kuromiya later grew up. Both Kuromiya's parents were born in California and after 15 years of living in Monrovia and a year between Arizona and Nevada in 1961, Kuromiya decided to leave the West Coast to go to college in Philadelphia to study at the University of Pennsylvania. Kuromiya labels his own motivation to move to Philadelphia in 1961 as due solely to the name "City of Brotherly Love," and Kuromiya's activism truly began in the 1960s when he became involved in civil rights organizing.

Kiyoshi Kuromiya came out as gay to his parents when he was roughly 8 or 9 years old living in California and says that he was fairly sexually active. Kuromiya, who went by Steve instead of Kiyoshi at the time, the early '50s, mentioned in an interview with Tommi Mecca in 1983 that he did not know any of the terminology due to a lack of literature—he had never heard the word gay and didn't know what a homosexual was. As a result, Kuromiya utilized the Monrovia Public Library in order to learn more about the identity that he knew "was very important to him."

Kuromiya was a third-generation Japanese American and grew up primarily attending white schools in the Los Angeles suburbs, he says in an interview with Marc Stein in 1997. He was arrested in a public park with a 16-year-old boy when he was only 9 or 10 for lewdness and was put in juvenile hall for three days as punishment. Kuromiya mentions in his interview with Stein how his being arrested made him feel like a sort of criminal without knowing it, and left him with a feeling of shame that forced him to be secretive about his sex life—even early on.

== Student activism ==
Kuromiya started attending college at the University of Pennsylvania in September 1961 as one of six Benjamin Franklin National Scholars; he was a part of a large scholarship that covered almost all of the associated costs of attending. Kiyoshi decided to study architecture, feeling it was a field that encompassed a variety of humanistic fields and was inspired by Louis Kahn who too attended Penn and was a professor of architecture at the School of Design. Kuromiya's increased involvement in human rights activities during the early 1960s stemmed largely from his sexual orientation and his feeling that the University of Pennsylvania was very closeted.

Kuromiya continued his activism in earnest during his first year at Penn in 1962 by participating in the Congress of Racial Equality (CORE) Maryland diner sit-ins. Kuromiya was in attendance not far from Martin Luther King Jr. during his "I Have a Dream" speech and met King along with Rev. Ralph Abernathy and James Baldwin later that night. After meeting with Dr. King after the march on Washington in 1963, Kuromiya continued to work closely with the reverend throughout the civil rights movement.

In 1965, Kuromiya and other activists took over Independence Hall in Philadelphia, Pennsylvania, calling it the Freedom Hotel in support of people injured at Pettus Bridge in Selma during the civil rights march from Selma to Montgomery in Alabama. A week later, on March 13, 1965, after flying down South, Kuromiya was assaulted by the police along with Dr. King, Rev. Fred Shuttlesworth, and James Forman while helping a group of Black high school students register to vote at the state capitol building in Montgomery, Alabama. The next day, while hospitalized and police-cordoned, Kuromiya confronted the county's presiding officer about the incident, receiving an apology which King referred to as the first time a southern officer had apologized for injuring a civil rights worker. Kuromiya and King also received a signed statement from the Sheriff disbanding the sheriff's volunteer posse—the same as the White Citizens Council or K.K.K.—that assaulted Kuromiya. Kuromiya became so close to the King family that, after King's assassination in 1968, he helped care for the King children in Atlanta during the week of the funeral.

=== Antiwar demonstrations ===
In April 1968, Kuromiya instigated the largest antiwar demonstration in Penn's history, attracting thousands of people. Kiyoshi printed and put up leaflets from a fictional group called the Americong that said there would be an innocent dog burned with napalm in front of the Van Pelt Library at Penn in protest of the use of napalm in the Vietnam War. On the day of the protest Kuromiya handed out leaflets that said "Congratulations, you've saved the life of an innocent dog. How about the hundreds of thousands of Vietnamese that have been burned alive?"

In addition to deceptively luring thousands of people to the Penn library, Kuromiya was very involved in the antiwar movement throughout the early years of his activist career. On October 20 and 21, 1967, Kuromiya joined a large demonstration organized by Abbie Hoffman that attempted to levitate the Pentagon building by joining hands around it in a performance art protest. When the levitation failed, Kiyoshi joined other protesters in taking police barricades to make bonfires all the way around the length of the Pentagon. The next year, Kiyoshi created posters for mail distribution under the name Dirty Linen Corporation that depicted Bill Greenshields grinning while burning his draft card with the words "FUCK THE DRAFT" in huge letters. Later that year, Kuromiya was arrested by federal marshals and Secret Service for using the U.S. mail system for his crime-inciting and indecent poster. Despite the danger of doing so, Kuromiya distributed 2,000 copies of the poster at the Democratic convention at the Chicago Conrad Hilton Hotel, which was surrounded by machine guns and jeep trucks with barbed wire as a result of the Chicago police riot.

== Gay liberation struggle ==
In addition to Kuromiya's civil rights and antiwar movement involvement, Kiyoshi was very active in the gay liberation movement. Kuromiya officially came out as gay on July 4, 1965, at the first Annual Reminder protest which took place at Independence Hall. There were similar demonstrations in Washington, D.C., and New York City and the Philadelphia protest brought in a total of 12 activists. The Annual Reminder protest happened for five years until 1969, and was the first time on record when individuals publicly assembled to call for equal rights for homosexuals.

Kuromiya co-founded the Gay Liberation Front (GLF) in 1969 following the Stonewall riots in 1969 with Basil O'Brien, who he met later while attending a Homophile Action League meeting in Philadelphia. Kuromiya describes the idea behind gay liberation as a sort of male-consciousness raising that served to help individuals deal with the isolation they felt as a result of their sexual identity. The GLF in Philadelphia had a significant proportion of African-Americans, Latinos, and Asians—though they were only a small group of about a dozen in 1969. Nonetheless, the GLF was more radical than some of its peer organizations that formed after Stonewall. Under Kuromiya's leadership, the GLF recruited a diverse array of people and stood in solidarity with groups such as the Black Panther Party and the Young Lords. Kuromiya even received support for the gay liberation struggle when he represented the GLF as an openly gay delegate to the 1970 Black Panther Party Convention at Temple University. In 1970, Kuromiya attended Rebirth of Dionysian Spirit, a national gay liberation conference in Austin, Texas—an experience that changed the way he viewed the gay liberation struggle in some senses.

== AIDS advocacy ==
Kuromiya began working earnestly on the AIDS movement once the AIDS epidemic began in America in the early 1980s. Kiyoshi was most involved with ACT UP (the AIDS Coalition to Unleash Power)— of which he founded the Philadelphia chapter. After being diagnosed with AIDS himself in 1989, Kuromiya only intensified his advocacy work. Kiyoshi approached his work with the motto "Information is power" and educated himself on the AIDS issues to the point he was invited to participate in National Institutes of Health alternative therapy panels. He created the ACT UP Standards of Care, which was the first of its kind for people with HIV produced by people with AIDS.

Kuromiya also founded the Critical Path newsletter, which he mailed out to thousands of people worldwide as well as to hundreds of incarcerated individuals who didn't have access to AIDS information. He further developed the Critical Path newsletter, one of the first resources on HIV treatment widely available to the public, into one of the first websites on the Internet, filled with the latest HIV/AIDS information. From there, the site became host to the Critical Path AIDS Project—through which Kuromiya operated a 24-hour hotline for anyone who sought his help and provided free internet to hundreds of people with HIV in Philadelphia.

== Impact litigation ==
In the late 1990s, Kuromiya was a part of several successful impact litigation cases. Kiyoshi went to the Supreme Court in 1997 in order to expand freedom of speech rights to protections of the circulation of sexually explicit information about AIDS on the Internet, which led to the court's striking down part of the Communications Decency Act. In 1999 Kuromiya was also involved in the class-action suit, Kuromiya vs. The United States of America, in which he presented his case for the legalization of marijuana for medical use for people with AIDS. Kuromiya also ran a marijuana buyer's club as a medical marijuana activist and served a few dozen clients with AIDS in the Philadelphia-area with free marijuana.

== Personal life and death ==
In 1983, Kuromiya visited with his mother at the Heart Mountain Relocation Camp for Japanese Americans, where he was born, which he recalls as being a formative experience for him as an activist. He survived lung cancer in the mid-1970s. Soon after he became close friends with techno-futurist Buckminster Fuller, with whom he toured the country for about five years. Kuromiya collaborated on Fuller's last six books and published Fuller's last book posthumously in 1992. Most prominently Kuromiya assisted the scientist with Critical Path, an influential 1981 book about technology's potential to improve the world. Kuromiya was also a nationally ranked Scrabble player.

Kuromiya died of complications from cancer on May 10, 2000, a day after his 57th birthday, though his death was initially reported as due to complications from AIDS.

== Legacy ==
On June 4, 2022, he was honored with a Google Doodle.

On May 9, 2023, his 80th birthday (as an ancestor) was celebrated in Philadelphia, Pennsylvania, and Monrovia, California.

== Brief timeline ==
- 1962: CORE restaurant sit-ins, Route 40, Aberdeen, Maryland
- 1963: Martin Luther King, Jr. speech, 8/28, Lincoln Memorial, and later to meet King at Willard Hotel, Washington, DC
- 1965: Injured at State Capitol Building, Montgomery, Alabama, leading black high school students in voter registration march, 3/13
- 1965: First homosexual rights demonstration ever - Independence Hall, Philadelphia, 7/4
- 1967: "Armies of Night" march on Pentagon, Arlington, VA
- 1968: Martin Luther King, Jr. funeral, Atlanta - cared for Martin Jr. and Dexter week of funeral at King house in Vine City
- 1968: Lincoln Park and Conrad Hilton, Chicago, Democratic National Convention riots at Grant Park
- 1969: Spoke at Black Panther Party's Revolutionary People's Constitutional Convention, Temple University, Philadelphia
- 1970: "Rebirth of Dionysian Spirit," National Gay Liberation Conference, Austin, TX
- 1972: First Rainbow Family Gathering, Granby, CO
- 1974–1977: Survived metastatic lung cancer
- 1978–1983: Traveled worldwide with Buckminster Fuller, collaborated on his last six books, published last book posthumously in 1992 (Fuller died in 1983); Philadelphia, California
- 1988: First employee of We the People with AIDS and charter member of ACT-UP, Philadelphia
- 1992: ACT-UP members injured at demo at Bellevue Stratford Hotel, numerous ACT-UP arrests around the country
- 1996: Sat on FDA panel that recommended approval of first potent protease inhibitors
- 1997: Critical Path AIDS Project - Supreme Court overturns Communications Decency Act on internet censorship - lead litigant
- 1999: Kuromiya vs. United States of America - class action suit on medical use of marijuana.

== See also ==
- List of civil rights activists
- List of peace activists
- List of LGBT rights organizations
