= Upton Sinclair House =

Historic house in California, United States

- U.S. National Register of Historic Places
- U.S. National Historic Landmark
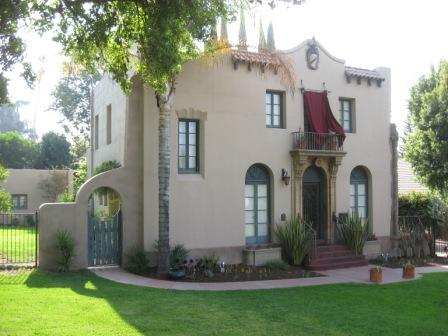

- Location within the Los Angeles metropolitan area Location within California Location within the United States
- Location: 464 N. Myrtle Avenue
- Coordinates: 34°9′44″N 118°0′0″W
- Area: 0.8 acres (0.32 ha)
- Built: 1923
- NRHP reference No.: 71000153
- Added to NRHP: November 11, 1971

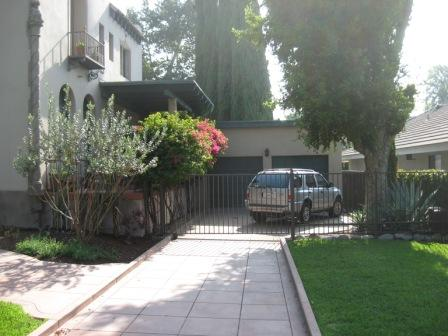
Side of Upton Sinclair House

The Upton Sinclair House is an historic house at 464 N. Myrtle Avenue, Monrovia, California. Built in 1923, it was the home of American novelist Upton Sinclair (1878–1968) between 1942 and 1966, and is where he wrote many of his later works. It was listed on the National Register of Historic Places and was declared a National Historic Landmark in 1971. It is a private residence.

== Description and history ==
The Upton Sinclair House is located in the foothills of the San Gabriel Mountains, north of the center of Monrovia at the southeast corner of North Myrtle Avenue and East Scenic Drive. It is a Neo-Mediterranean building in a district of similar houses. It is made of poured concrete and includes "ball-and-ribbon" concrete moldings and Batchelder tile. Its main entrance is set in an ornate archway, with an iron balcony above. The entrance and flanking windows are set in round-arch openings. To the rear right of the house is a period garage.

The house was designed by California architect Frederick H. Wallis and built in 1923. It was purchased by Sinclair in 1942, seeking a quieter location than Pasadena, where he had been living. Sinclair is best known for his exposé style of writing, epitomized by The Jungle, his 1906 novel exposing unsavory practices in the meatpacking industry. Sinclair was awarded the Pulitzer Prize for Fiction in 1943.

Many of Sinclair's later works were written while he lived here, in a studio space created in the garage. The grounds also include a concrete vault where he kept all his papers.

The house sustained damage during the 1991 Sierra Madre earthquake (5.6M) and was nearly torn down by its owner; however, California's state historic preservation office denied the demolition.

== See also ==
- List of National Historic Landmarks in California
- National Register of Historic Places listings in Los Angeles County, California
- List of residences of American writers
