= Daun Kennedy =

American actress and pin-up model (1922–2002)

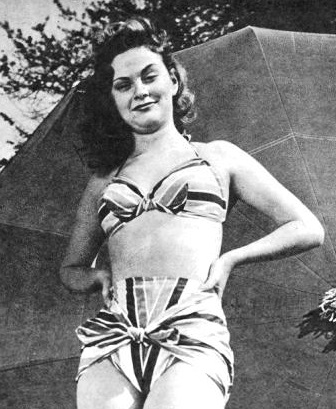
- Kennedy in 1945
- Born: Carmen S. Kennedy; November 13, 1922; Seattle, Washington, U.S.
- Died: August 12, 2002 (aged 79); Magalia, California, U.S.
- Occupation: Actress
- Years active: 1943–1947
- Spouse: Fred L. McDowell
- Children: 2

Daun Kennedy (born Carmen S. Kennedy; November 13, 1922 – August 12, 2002) was an American actress and wartime pin-up figure who appeared in Hollywood films during the 1940s. Best known for her roles in serials such as The Royal Mounted Rides Again and Son of the Guardsman, Kennedy's short-lived but colorful career was widely covered in wartime newspapers. Her rise from Boeing aircraft worker to RKO Studios contract player embodied the “Cinderella story” trope frequently used by the film industry during World War II.

== Early life ==
Daun Kennedy was born in Seattle, Washington. She studied music and began her career as a singer with the Seattle Opera Company, where she performed light opera. Her singing career was disrupted by laryngitis, leading her to seek work at the Boeing Aircraft plant during World War II.

While at Boeing, a friend noticed her photogenic appearance and sent a tip to Hollywood contacts. Kennedy later moved to California, where she took a job as a messenger at RKO Studios.

== Discovery and Hollywood entrance ==
Kennedy was famously discovered just hours after starting her messenger job at RKO. She delivered a message to the set of a Kay Kyser film and caught the attention of director Allan Dwan. According to newspaper accounts, Dwan immediately sent her for a screen test and signed her to a contract.

== Career ==
Kennedy's screen debut came in Around the World (1943), where she had a minor role. She appeared in several studio productions over the next four years, including Salome, Where She Danced as Salome girl.

Her breakout came in the 13-chapter Universal serial The Royal Mounted Rides Again (1945), where she played the female lead June Bailey. She later starred in Columbia Pictures’ swashbuckling serial Son of the Guardsman (1946), opposite Bob Shaw.

== Wartime publicity and pin-up status ==
During World War II, Kennedy became a minor pin-up figure. Her image was widely circulated in publications catering to U.S. soldiers. In one 1943 article, she appeared nearly nude on a faux “iceberg” in response to a Pacific Theater request for “the girl we would most like to warm our iceberg.”

Kennedy also made headlines for adopting a black cat named Spooky from the Humane Society, who only responded to whistling. This quirky story was part of a broader publicity strategy that framed her as both glamorous and relatable, even promoting the claim—likely studio-invented—that she was descended from Mary, Queen of Scots, tying in with her medieval costume in Son of the Guardsman.

== Personal life ==
Daun Kennedy was once engaged to Fred MacDowell, a fellow Boeing employee and later RKO film technician, who reportedly helped introduce her to the studio. After her Hollywood years, she married Fred L. McDowell and had two daughters. She left the film industry in the late 1940s and lived a private life in California.

== Death ==
Daun Kennedy died of a heart attack on August 12, 2002, in Magalia, California, at the age of 79.

== Selected filmography ==
- Around the World (1943)
- Gildersleeve on Broadway (1943)
- Show Business (1944)
- Murder, My Sweet (1944)
- Salome, Where She Danced (1945)
- The Royal Mounted Rides Again (1945)
- Son of the Guardsman (1946)
- Bowery Bombshell (1946)
- A Scandal in Paris (1946)
- Jiggs and Maggie in Society (1947)
