= Spaceship Earth =

Worldview of Earth as an enclosed biosystem

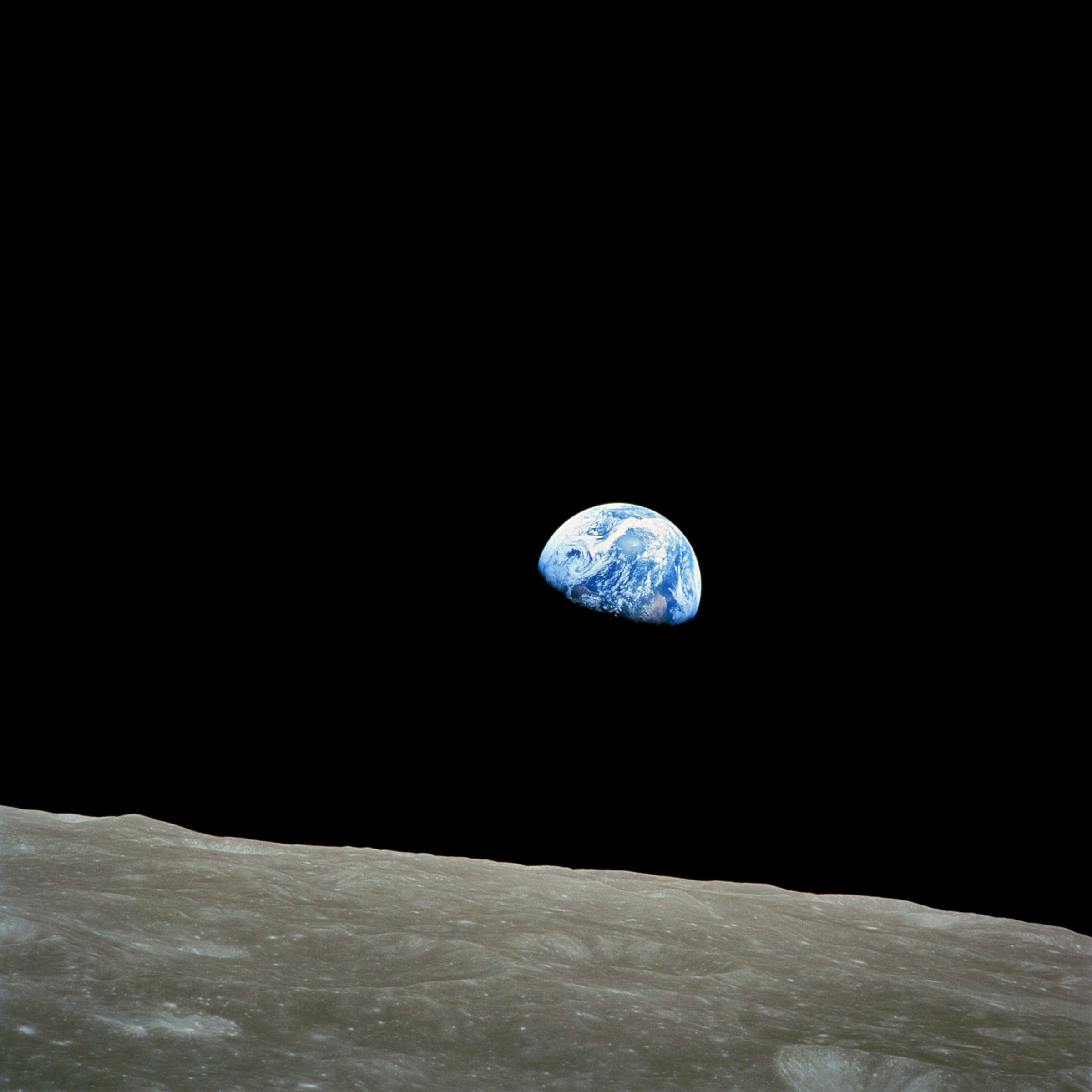
Earthrise, 1968 photo taken by astronaut Bill Anders from the Apollo 8 command module

Spaceship Earth (or Spacecraft Earth or Spaceship Planet Earth) is a worldview encouraging everyone on Earth to act as a harmonious crew working toward the greater good.

== History ==
The earliest known use of the term is a passage in Henry George's best known work, Progress and Poverty (1879). From book IV, chapter 2:

It is a well-provisioned ship, this on which we sail through space. If the bread and beef above decks seem to grow scarce, we but open a hatch and there is a new supply, of which before we never dreamed. And very great command over the services of others comes to those who as the hatches are opened are permitted to say, "This is mine!"

Around the same time, Walt Whitman in Old Age Echoes (Leaves of Grass, multiple editions between 1855 and 1891) associated:

One thought ever at the fore—
That at the Divine Ship, the World, breasting Time and Space,
All peoples of the globe together sail, sail the same voyage, are bound to the same destination.

George Orwell had earlier paraphrased Henry George in his 1937 book The Road to Wigan Pier:

The world is a raft sailing through space with, potentially, plenty of provisions for everybody; the idea that we must all cooperate and see to it that everyone does his fair share of the work and gets his fair share of the provisions seems so blatantly obvious that one would say that no one could possibly fail to accept it unless he had some corrupt motive for clinging to the present system.

In 1965, Adlai Stevenson made a speech to the United Nations, in which he said:

We travel together, passengers on a little space ship, dependent on its vulnerable reserves of air and soil; all committed for our safety to its security and peace; preserved from annihilation only by the care, the work, and, I will say, the love we give our fragile craft. We cannot maintain it half fortunate, half miserable, half confident, half despairing, half slave—to the ancient enemies of man—half free in a liberation of resources undreamed of until this day. No craft, no crew can travel safely with such vast contradictions. On their resolution depends the survival of us all.

The following year, Spaceship Earth became the title of a book by a friend of Stevenson's, the economist Barbara Ward.

In 1966, Kenneth E. Boulding, who was influenced by reading Henry George's work, used the phrase in the title of his essay, The Economics of the Coming Spaceship Earth. Boulding described the past open economy of apparently illimitable resources, which he said he was tempted to call the "cowboy economy", and continued: "The closed economy of the future might similarly be called the 'spaceman' economy, in which the earth has become a single spaceship, without unlimited reservoirs of anything, either for extraction or for pollution, and in which, therefore, man must find his place in a cyclical ecological system". This "cowboys in a spaceship" theme would eventually be taken up by scholar David Korten in his 1995 book When Corporations Rule the World.

The phrase was also popularized by Buckminster Fuller in his Dymaxion philosophy, who authored the 1968 book Operating Manual for Spaceship Earth. This quotation, referring to fossil fuels, reflects his approach:

... we can make all of humanity successful through science's world-engulfing industrial evolution provided that we are not so foolish as to continue to exhaust in a split second of astronomical history the orderly energy savings of billions of years' energy conservation aboard our Spaceship Earth. These energy savings have been put into our Spaceship's life-regeneration-guaranteeing bank account for use only in self-starter functions.

United Nations Secretary-General U Thant spoke of Spaceship Earth on Earth Day March 21, 1971 at the ceremony of the ringing of the Japanese Peace Bell: "May there only be peaceful and cheerful Earth Days to come for our beautiful Spaceship Earth as it continues to spin and circle in frigid space with its warm and fragile cargo of animate life."

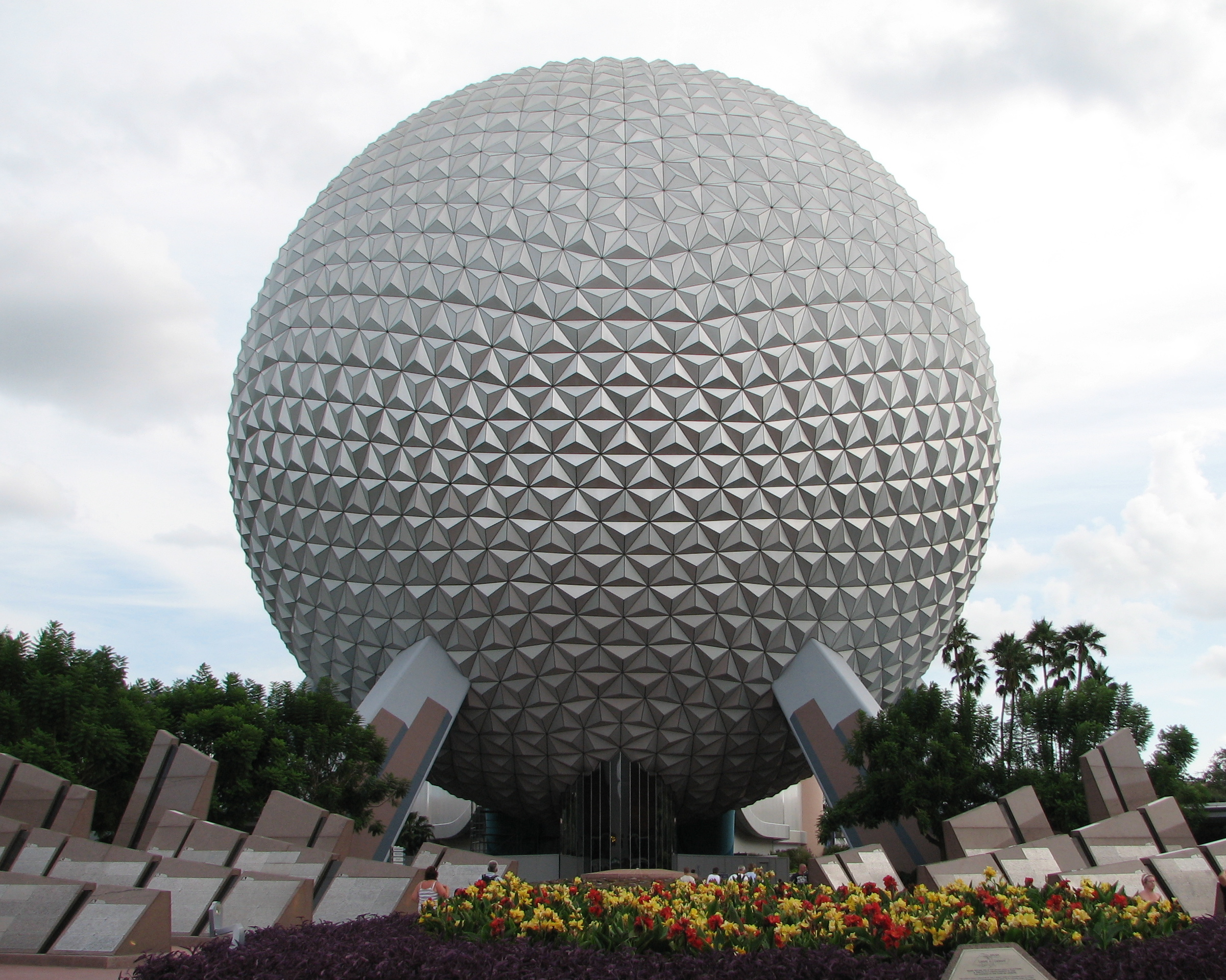
Epcot's Spaceship Earth

Spaceship Earth is the name given to the 50 m (160 ft) diameter geodesic sphere that greets visitors at the entrance of Walt Disney World's Epcot theme park. Housed within the sphere is a dark ride that serves to explore the history of communications and promote Epcot's founding principles, "[a] belief and pride in man's ability to shape a world that offers hope to people everywhere." A previous incarnation of the ride, narrated by actor Jeremy Irons and revised in 2008, was explicit in its message:

Like a grand and miraculous spaceship, our planet has sailed through the universe of time, and for a brief moment, we have been among its many passengers... We now have the ability and the responsibility to build new bridges of acceptance and co-operation between us, to create a better world for ourselves and our children as we continue our amazing journey aboard Spaceship Earth.

The term "Spaceship Earth" is frequently used on the labels of Emanuel Bronner's products to emphasize and promote his belief in the unity of humankind.

== Criticism ==
Sociologist Steffen Roth has argued that, if realized, Spaceship Earth would epitomise the most total institution ever created in human history.

== See also ==
- Collective intelligence
- Gaia hypothesis
- Global catastrophic risk
- Global citizenship
- Overview effect
- The Zeitgeist Movement
- World community
