= Robert Gottschall =

American actor (1915–2005)

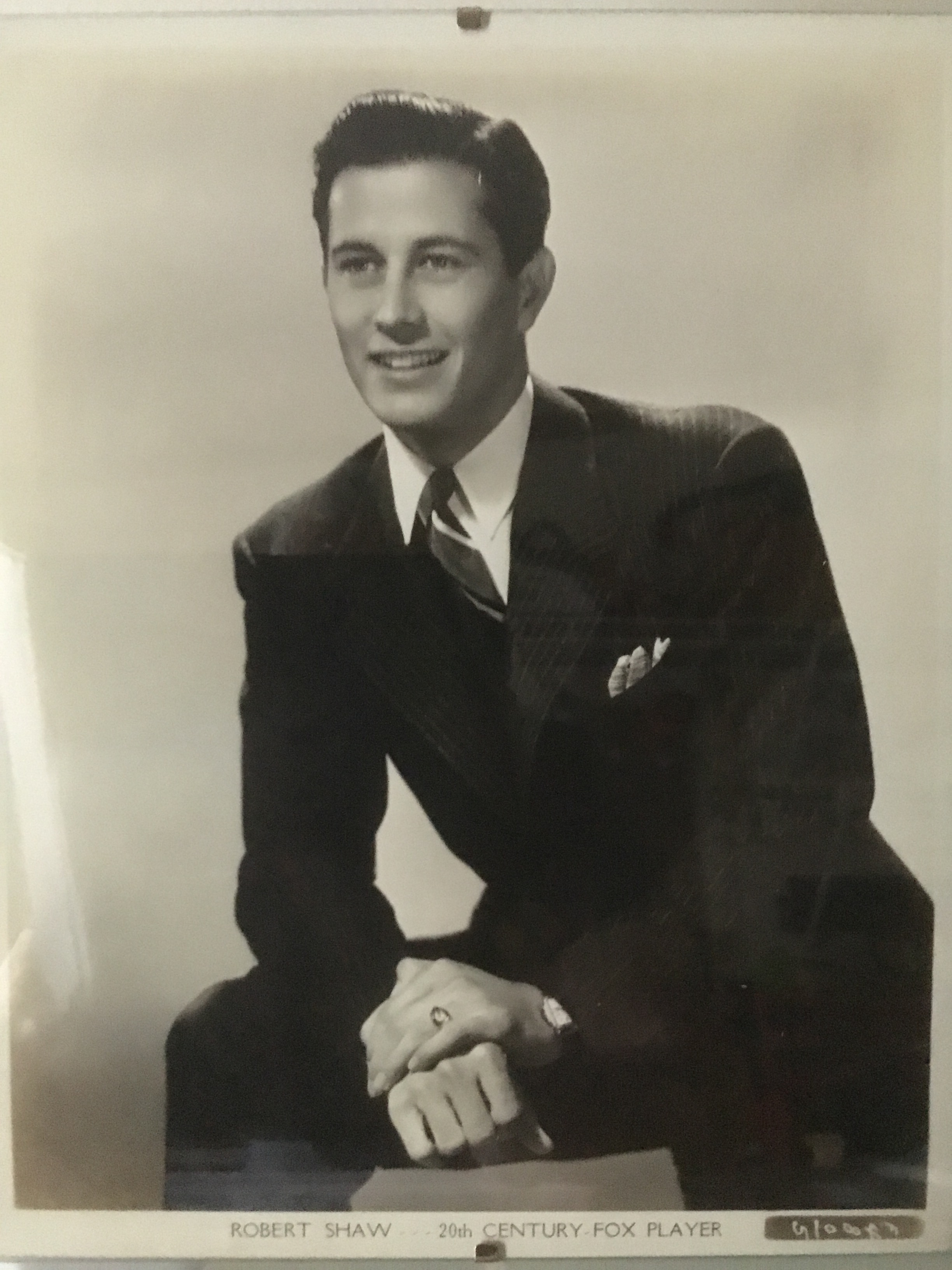
- Born: Robert Elmer Gottschall; September 15, 1915; Dallas, Texas, U.S.
- Died: January 3, 2005 (aged 89); Austin, Texas, U.S.
- Occupation: Actor
- Years active: 1939–1984
- Spouse: Mary Sue Mills (m. 1942; died 2004)
- Children: 3

Robert Elmer Gottschall (September 15, 1915 – January 3, 2005), sometimes credited in films by the stage name Bob Shaw or Robert Shaw, was an American actor.

== Early life and career ==
Born and raised in Dallas, Texas, Gottschall was the younger of two sons born to Kitty Carol Rife and Lester B. Gottschall. He attended Southern Methodist University and performed with the Dallas Little School of Theatre in 1936. He attracted a talent scout's attention after one semester. He had a three-year contract with 20th Century Fox before joining the military. The contract was accompanied by the professional name Robert Shaw.

Gottschall enlisted in the United States Army during World War II and served five years. He later re-enlisted and served in the military until 1963.

Gottschall married Mary Sue Mills on August 15, 1942, in Asbury Park, New Jersey.

When he died, just weeks after his wife of over 62 years, he was buried at the Fort Sam Houston National Cemetery in San Antonio, Texas.

== Filmography ==
- Rose of Washington Square (1939) as Newspaper reporter (uncredited)
- Boy Friend (1939) as Cracker
- Young Mr. Lincoln (1939) as Dancer in Ballroom Seen Dancing with Old Woman (uncredited)
- Charlie Chan in Reno (1939) as College Student (uncredited)
- Quick Millions (1939) as National Park Ranger Barry Frazier
- Here I Am a Stranger (1939) as College Student
- 20,000 Men a Year (1939) as Tommy Howell
- The Grapes of Wrath (1940) as Gas Station Attendant #1 in Needles (uncredited)
- Johnny Apollo (1940) as Clerk (uncredited)
- Star Dust (1940) as Boy Leaving Hollywood (uncredited)
- Lillian Russell (1940) as Undetermined Role (uncredited)
- Sailor's Lady (1940) as Ensign (uncredited)
- Manhattan Heartbeat (1940) in a bit role (uncredited)
- Young People (1940) as Usher (uncredited)
- The Great Profile (1940) as Reporter (uncredited)
- Public Deb No. 1 (1940) as Reporter (uncredited)
- Golden Hoofs (1941) as Party Guest (uncredited)
- Adam Had Four Sons (1941) as Chris Stoddard (older)
- Tobacco Road (1941) as Hillbilly (uncredited)
- Ride on Vaquero (1941) as Lieutenant Kirk
- Rise and Shine (1941) as Student Asst. Manager (uncredited)
- Sex Hygiene (1942) can be seen several times in audience watching training film
- Son of the Guardsman (1946) as David Trent (as Bob Shaw)
- The Late George Apley (1947) as Bit Role (uncredited)
- Captain from Castile (1947) as Spanish Army Officer (uncredited)
- Berlin Express (1948) as Train ticket seller(uncredited)
- Honeysuckle Rose (1980) as Store Clerk
- The Big Brawl (1980) as Man on Beach (as Robert Gottschall)
- Adam (1983) as Father Mike Conboy (as Robert Gottschall)
- The Sky's No Limit (1984) as Dr. Belkin (Last appearance)
