= Amada Miyachi America =

AMADA WELD TECH
- Type: Private
- Industry: Industrial Equipment
- Headquarters: Monrovia, California, USA
- Area served: Worldwide
- Key people: Kurt Tolliver (CEO), Sayeed Chowdhury (CFO)
- Revenue: US $90 million Consolidated revenue for parent company, AMADA Corporation - ¥20 billion Consolidated net sales for parent company, Amada Co., Ltd.* – ¥200 billion
- Website: www.amadaweldtech.com

Amada Weld Tech (stylized as AMADA WELD TECH), a subsidiary of Amada Weld Tech Co., Ltd., designs and manufactures equipment and systems for resistance welding, laser welding, laser marking, laser cutting, laser micro machining, hermetic sealing, micro tig welding, and hot bar reflow soldering and bonding. Established in 1948, AMADA WELD TECH is headquartered in Monrovia, California, USA. The company's equipment is used in numerous industries, chiefly medical, aerospace, automotive, battery production, and electronic component manufacturing. Amada Weld Tech has approximately 200 employees, with 7 sales and manufacturing offices serving about 12,000 customers worldwide. More than 80,000 items are manufactured annually. The company is certified to ISO 9001:2015, China Compulsory Certificate (CCC), European Conformity (CE), and Canadian Standards Association (CSA) quality certifications.

== Amada Weld Tech Co., Ltd. ==
Amada Weld Tech's parent company, Amada Weld Tech Co., Ltd., was founded in 1972 to manufacture and market semiconductor-related measuring instruments and welding control equipment in response to the demand for quality control in the automobile, television, and electronics industries. The company incorporated microprocessors and other electronic devices into its resistance welders to enable high quality precision joining and monitoring and analysis. Its Weld Checkers™ are used worldwide for weld monitoring.

In 1984, the company developed a neodymium-doped yttrium aluminum garnet (Nd:YAG) laser welder that allowed for more precise and micro welding; this product line became a central component of the company's business, along with resistance welding. In 2006, the company developed the first Yb: fiber laser welder in Japan.

Amada Weld Tech Co., Ltd. has more than 600 employees (consolidated) in 10 sales offices and 2 factories in Japan, 7 subsidiary companies (Amada Weld Tech Inc., Amada Weld Tech Gmbh, Amada Weld Tech Korea Co., Ltd., Amada Weld Tech Shanghai Co., Ltd., Amada (Thailand) Co., Ltd., Amada Weld Tech India Pvt., Ltd., Amada Weld Tech Taiwan CO., Ltd., and Amada Vietnam Co., Ltd.) and 4 factories overseas (China, USA, Germany, Thailand). Annual revenue is ¥20 billion.

Amada Weld Tech is an Amada Group Company. It is headquartered in Isehara, Kanagawa, Japan and develops, manufactures, sells, and services products and systems for metal sheet processing, metal cutting, pressing, and machine tooling. The company was established in 1946 and is listed on the Tokyo Stock Exchange (6113:Tokyo). It has 60 subsidiaries (17 in Japan and 43 overseas) and more than 7000 employees worldwide. Annual revenue exceeds ¥200 billion.

== Products ==
Amada Weld Tech specializes in the design and manufacture of welding, marking, cutting and bonding equipment, as well as automated systems. Major products include:

- Standard and customized laser and resistance systems – Application qualification and testing, system specification, assembly, system verification, and installation and training. Included are gloveboxes and dryboxes, tooling, motion, optics, software, monitoring.
- Laser marking equipment – Fiber laser markers, semi-automated workstations, custom tooling, accessories and consumables.
- Laser welding equipment – Fiber and Nd:YAG laser welders, pulsed and continuous wave, automated and semi-automated workstations, fiber optic cables, custom tooling, accessories and consumables.
- Laser cutting and micromachining – Systems with up to 5 axes of coordinated motion, proprietary position-based firing laser control, for stainless steel, copper, silver, titanium, platinum iridium, and plastics. Fiber or femtosecond lasers.
- Resistance welding – Power supplies (linear DC, high and mid frequency inverters, capacitive discharge, AC weld controls), weld monitors and checkers, displacement monitors, weld heads (manual and air actuated, servo-motor controlled, electromagnetic), accessories and consumables.
- Heat seal bonding – Reflow and heat seal power supplies, automated and semi-automated workstations, FPD repair stations, thermodes, accessories and consumables for connecting flexible circuits and PC boards or LCD screens.

== Applications ==
Amada Weld Tech currently offers seven different technologies, which the company combines to create end-to-end assembly joining solutions to facilitate reliable and repeatable welding. A few of the key application areas include:

- Medical devices – laser welding, laser marking, and laser cutting technologies for welding, marking, sealing and cutting state-of-the-art medical devices made of both plastic and metal, including cardiac pacemakers, defibrillators, guidewires, catheters, cannulae, hearing aids, brachyseeds, orthodontic appliances, prosthetics, and surgical tools. The company's laser welding and resistance welding equipment and atmospheric enclosures were used in the production of a cochlear implant shown in this video.
- Aerospace – welding of batteries, sensors, displays, and jet engine honeycomb manufacture and repair.
- Automotive – direct part marking with text, graphics, bar codes and data matrix codes; laser welding, laser marking and engraving, resistance welding, and hot bar reflow soldering of sensors, switches, dashboard electronics, lighting components, and brake shoes.
- Electronic components – resistance and laser welding of hard drive read/write armatures, hard disk assemblies, electrical connectors, lead frame assemblies, relay terminal connections, and batteries.

== Patents ==
Amada Weld Tech has been awarded numerous patents for its resistance and laser welding inventions, over the period 1971 through the present, including the following:

Name of Invention	Number	Date of Patent	Assignee	Inventor
Wire Bonder	3,601,304	24-Aug-71	Unitek Corp	Momtar Nasshi Mansour
Arm Assembly for Bonding Apparatus	3,664,567	23-May-72	Unitek Corp	Joseph Laub
Pulsed Heat Eutectic Bonder	3,790,738	5-Feb-74	Unitek Corp	Joseph Laub & Jenkins Griffith
Pulse Heated Thermocompression Bonding Apparatus	3,891,822	24-Jun-75	Unitek Corp	Joseph Laub & John F. Hurst
Bonding Apparatus Utilizing Pivotally Mounted Bounding Arm	3,940,047	24-Feb-76	Unitek Corp	Joseph Laub
Voltage Regulated Capacitive Discharge Welding Power Supply	4,228,340	14-Oct-80	Unitek Corp	Gerald Dufrenne
Direct Current Pulse	4,564,735	14-Jan-86	Unitek Corp	Gerald Dufrenne
Weld resistance Measuring Apparatus for a Spot Welder	4,639,569	27-Jan-87	Unitek Corp	Gerald Dufrenne
Titiable Electric Thermode for Multiple Connection Reflow Soldering	4,871,899	3-Oct-89	Unitek Corp	Gerald Dufrenne
Apparatus and Method for Monitoring Weld Quality	5,081,092	14-Jan-92	Unitek Equipment	Gerald Dufrenne
Motorized Weld Head	5,225,647	6-Jul-93	Unitek Equipment	Gerald Dufrenne
Fast Response Weld Head	5,386,092	31-Jan-95	Unitek Equipment	Gerald Dufrenne
Method and Apparatus for Automatically Adjusting Air Pressure in a Pneumatic Weld Head	5,954,976	21-Sep-99	Unitek Miyachi	Talal M. Al-Nabulsi
Reflow Soldering Self-Aligning Fixture	6,047,875	11-Apr-00	Unitek Miyachi	Talal M. Al-Nabulsi
Reflow Soldering Self-Aligning Fixture	US 6,047,875 B1	5-Jun-01	Unitek Corp	Talal M. Al-Nabulsi
Method and Apparatus for Automatically Adjusting Air Pressure in a Pneumatic Weld Head	US 6,294,750 B1	25-Sep-01	Unitek Miyachi	Talal M. Al-Nabulsi
Laser Weld Monitor	US 6,670,574 B1	30-Dec-03	Unitek Miyachi	Gregory Bates & Girish Kelkar
Green Welding Laser	US 7,088,749 B2	8-Aug-06	Miyachi Unitek	Shinichi Nakayama, Girish Kelkar & Gregory Bates
Laser Weld Monitor	US 7,129,438 B1	31-Oct-06	Unitek Miyachi	Gregory Bates & Girish Kelkar
