= Buckminster Fuller (disambiguation) =

Buckminster Fuller (Richard Buckminster Fuller, 1895–1983) was an American architect, systems theorist, author, designer, inventor, and futurist.

Buckminster Fuller may also refer to:

- Buckminster Fuller (EP), by Nerina Pallot, 2009
- Arthur Buckminster Fuller (1822–1862), a Unitarian clergyman of the U.S.
- Buckminster Fuller Challenge, an annual international design competition

== See also ==
- Geodesic dome, a hemispherical thin-shell structure, popularised by Buckminster Fuller
- Buckminsterfullerene, is a type of fullerene with formula C_{60}
- R. Buckminster Fuller and Anne Hewlett Dome Home, in Carbondale, Illinois, U.S.
- Category:Buckminster Fuller
