= Cloud Nine (sphere) =

Proposed airborne habitats

Buckminster Fuller and Shoji Sadao, Project for Floating Cloud Structures (Cloud Nine), c. 1960

Cloud Nine is the name Buckminster Fuller gave to his proposed airborne habitats created from giant geodesic spheres, which might be made to levitate by slightly heating the air inside above the ambient temperature.

Geodesic spheres become stronger (and relative to the volume enclosed, lighter) as they become bigger, because of how they distribute stress over their surfaces. As a sphere gets bigger, the volume it encloses grows much faster than the mass of the enclosing structure itself. Fuller suggested that the mass of a mile-wide geodesic sphere would be negligible compared to the mass of the air trapped within it. He suggested that if the air inside such a sphere were heated even by one degree higher than the ambient temperature of its surroundings, the sphere could become airborne. He calculated that such a balloon could lift a considerable mass, and hence that 'mini-cities' or airborne towns of thousands of people could be built in this way.

A Cloud Nine could be tethered, or free-floating, or maneuverable so that it could migrate in response to climatic and environmental conditions, such as providing emergency shelters.

== In fiction ==
Maiden Flight, a science fiction novel by Eric Vinicoff, postulates a post-nuclear apocalyptic world in which humanity has either retreated underground or taken to the skies in 'windriders', essentially large (approximately one-mile diameter) tensegrity bubbles that employ a hot-air lift mechanism. These windriders may also qualify as arcologies as they are, for all practical purposes, self-sustaining.

== See also ==
- Aerospace architecture
- Arcology
- Colonization of Venus
- Floating cities and islands in fiction
- Tensegrity
