= Design science revolution =

R. Buckminster Fuller coined the term design science revolution to describe his proposed scientific and socio-economic revolution accomplished by shifting from "weaponry to livingry" through the application of what he called comprehensive anticipatory design science. His World Design Science Decade, proposed to the International Union of Architects in 1961, was an attempt to catalyze the revolution.

Fuller advocated the design science revolution as an alternative to politics, seeking to optimize planetary resources for the benefit of 100% of humanity. He coined the term synergetics to explain how design science could create rich returns, such as how "energy income" could be harvested from the environment. His main premise was that nature's existing and omnipotent order must be allowed to guide human designs, if they are to survive and thrive as a species. He wrote that humanity was approaching its critical test as a species, in which it would be determined whether or not man was a mistake of nature, or its greatest accomplishment. This sense of urgency for the design science revolution was reflected in numerous writings:

"The Dark Ages still reign over all humanity, and the depth and persistence of this domination are only now becoming clear. This prison has no steel bars, chains, or locks. Instead, it is locked by misorientation and built of misinformation. We are powerfully imprisoned ... by the terms in which we have been conditioned to think."

"There is now plenty for all. War is obsolete. It is imperative that we get the word to all humanity — RUSH — before someone ignorantly pushes the button that provokes pushing of all the buttons."

Fuller insisted that the key principle of the design science revolution was to recognize nature as technology:

"In its complexities of design integrity, the Universe is technology. The technology evolved by man is thus far amateurish compared to the elegance of nonhumanly contrived regeneration. Man does not spontaneously recognize technology other than his own, so he speaks of the rest as something he ignorantly calls nature."

He stressed that by utilizing these natural principles of technology, industrial civilization could transform from an extractive to a regenerative force within the context of Earth's ecosystems. Operationally, he viewed design science as the integration of natural principles within the utilization of planetary resources to achieve ever-increasing ephemeralization:

"Amongst other grand strategies for making the world work and taking care of everybody is the design science revolution of providing ever more effective tools and services with ever less, real resource investment per each unit of end performance. For instance, a communications satellite, weighing only one-quarter of a ton, is now out-performing the transoceanic communication capabilities of 175 thousand tons of copper cable."
