= Nine Chains to the Moon =

Book by Richard Buckminster Fuller

- First edition
- Author: R. Buckminster Fuller
- Language: English
- Publisher: Lippincott Williams & Wilkins
- Publication date: 1938
- Publication place: United States

Nine Chains to the Moon is a book by R. Buckminster Fuller, first published in 1938. The title refers to the observation that, when the book was written, the world population of humans (Fuller calls them "earthians"), if stood one atop another, could form chains that would reach back and forth between Earth and the Moon nine times.

The book presents Fuller's overview of technological history. It proposes the author's vision of future prosperity driven by ephemeralization, Fuller's term for the process of doing more with less. Fuller believed that this would lead to ever-increasing standards of living and ever-growing population despite finite resources. Fuller uses Henry Ford's assembly line as an example of how ephemeralization can lead to better products at lower cost with no upper bound on productivity.

== Editions ==
- Fuller, R. Buckminster (1938). Nine Chains to the Moon: An Adventure Story of Thought (First ed.). Philadelphia: Lippincott.
- Fuller, R. Buckminster (1963). Nine Chains to the Moon. Carbondale: Southern Illinois University Press. OCLC 217740.
- Fuller, R. Buckminster (1971). Nine Chains to the Moon. New York: Anchor.
- Fuller, R. Buckminster (1973). Nine Chains to the Moon. London: Cape. ISBN 0-224-00800-5.
