= Shoji Sadao =

Japanese American architect (1927–2019)

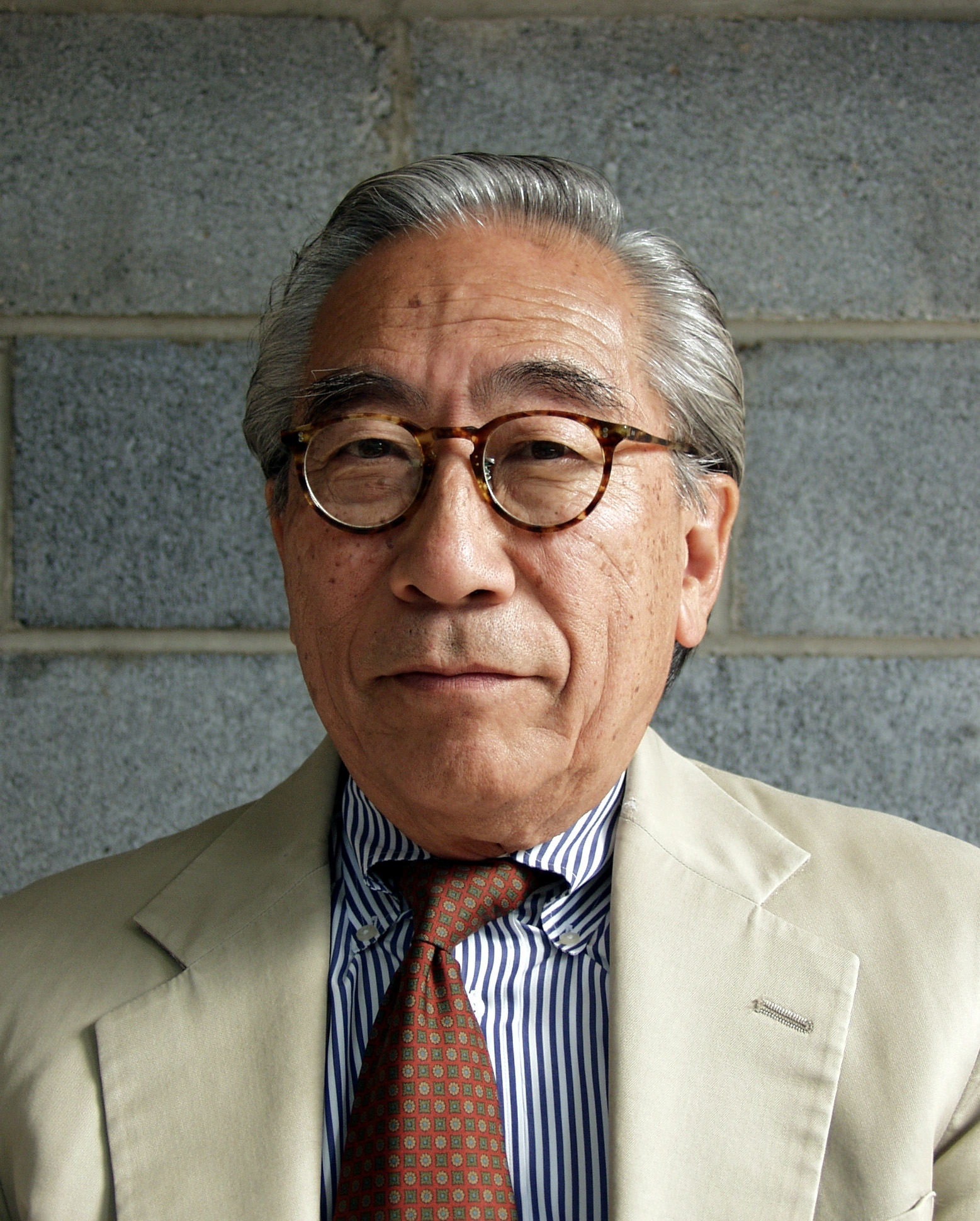
- Born: c.January 2, 1927^{1} Los Angeles, California, United States
- Died: November 3, 2019 (aged 92); Tokyo, Japan
- Education: Cornell University
- Occupation: Architect
- Spouse: Sawada Sadao (m. 1972; died 2019)
- Parent(s): Riichi and Otatsu (Kodama) Sadao

Shoji Sadao (貞尾 昭二, January 1927 – November 3, 2019) was a Japanese American architect, best known for his work and collaborations with R. Buckminster Fuller and Isamu Noguchi. During World War II he was stationed in Germany and was a cartographer for the U.S. Army.

== Early years ==
Sadao was born in Los Angeles, California. During World War II, he and most of his family were sent to the Gila River War Relocation Center in Arizona following the enforcement of Executive Order 9066. In 1945, Sadao was drafted into the US Army and served for four years.

== Professional life ==
Buckminster Fuller was Sadao’s instructor while studying architecture at Cornell University, where they first met in the early 1950s. In 1954, Sadao spent the year using his expertise as a cartographer to hand draw the Dymaxion Airocean World Map, which was his first collaboration with Fuller. The first edition of the map "the Raleigh edition" was printed by Edwards and Broughton and was issued in an edition of 3,000 copies in the summer of 1954. In 1964 Sadao co-founded the architectural firm Fuller & Sadao Inc., whose first project was to design the large geodesic dome for the U.S. Pavilion at Expo 67 in Montreal. In 1968 Fuller and Sadao designed Tetrahedron City, for Matsutaro Shoriki, a Japanese financier. The complex was designed to accommodate one million citizens in 300,000 apartment units and included a huge interior harbor. Tetrahedron City was conceived as an efficient and sustainable living-space alternative. Its massive size and low-cost was made possible by an aluminum octet truss system. By floating on the sea, it didn’t take up any space on land.

While working with lighting designer Edison Price in 1959, Sadao assisted Noguchi with the production of his folded aluminum sculpture at the Stable Gallery. Sadao began working with Noguchi on gardens and landscape projects in the 1960s, and in 1971 formed Noguchi Fountain and Plaza Inc., to design the Philip A. Hart Plaza and the Horace E. Dodge and Son Memorial Fountain in Detroit. Sadao also worked closely with Noguchi on the production of the well-known Akari Light Sculpture. In 1981 Sadao and Noguchi began work on the design and construction of the Isamu Noguchi Garden Museum, now known as the Noguchi Museum in Long Island City, New York, with both Fuller and Noguchi, the scope of Sadao's work has yet to be fully acknowledged, perhaps due to what he himself has described as his “self-effacing” quality as a collaborator.

== Later years ==
Sadao served as the Executive Director of the Noguchi Museum from 1989 to 2003. He has since been recognized as a lifetime honorary trustee at the museum. He was the author of the book Buckminster Fuller and Isamu Noguchi: Best of Friends, a biography which details overlapping work and influence among Fuller, Noguchi, and Sadao.

Sadao died in Tokyo on November 3, 2019.

== Notes ==
1. Sadao’s parents registered his birth certificate with a date of January 2, 1927. His school records indicated his birthday as December 20, 1926.
