= Stockade Building System =

Building block system using compressed wood shavings

The Stockade Building System was designed by Richard Buckminster Fuller and his father-in-law, James Monroe Hewlett, and was patented in 1927. Both of them had previously formed a company, in 1922, which made bricks out of compressed wood shavings with vertical holes cast in them.

== Design ==
The blocks were made up of a fibrous material with large interstices between the fibers. (One suggested fiber was excelsior, which is also known as wood wool.) Despite having large interstices, Fuller and Hewlett designed the blocks so they would not be absorbent. To make the blocks, the fibers were coated with plaster and molded in a form. This is called the Stockade Pneumatic Forming Process.

These blocks were cast with large holes in them so that a weight-bearing structure, such as concrete, could be poured inside them. The block's fibers were designed to be easily sawed so workers could cut holes in them to rest floor joists on the weight-bearing structure. The blocks came in various shapes and sizes. Some had two vertical holes for filling with concrete. Other blocks were much larger, with openings in the side for inserting large beams.

== Field trials ==
The system was evaluated at a residence in Tarpon Springs, Florida, in 1926.

== Patent ==
On October 8, 1926, Fuller and Hewlett filed for a patent for their brick design. After several months, on June 28, 1927, they received US patent #1,633,702 entitled Building System. It was an extension of Fuller's previous patent (US patent #1,604,097) from October 19, 1926.
