= Current solar income =

The current solar income of the Earth, or any ecoregion of the Earth, is the amount of solar energy that falls on it as sunlight. This is thought important in some branches of green economics, as the ultimate measure of renewable energy.

Buckminster Fuller first described the concept in his 1970 paper Cosmic Costing, contrasting the photosynthesis on which natural capital and sustainable infrastructural capital depend, with the chemosynthesis of extracting and using fossil fuels.

Paul Hawken is a more recent advocate of the concept, and views it as central to his notion of a restorative economy. It remains a popular notion among those who believe that toxic waste and maintenance problems of direct solar energy devices can ultimately be overcome, or that yields of passive or biological means of gathering and using this energy as biofuels can be made to approximate those of fossil fuels.

== Scientific context ==
In Earth science, the flow of incoming sunlight is treated as part of the Earth's energy budget, which accounts for the balance between incoming solar radiation and outgoing reflected and emitted energy. NASA explains that incoming radiation is almost entirely solar radiation, and that Earth’s climate depends on the balance between energy received from the Sun and energy returned to space.

NASA has also described the Sun as the major source of energy for Earth’s oceans, atmosphere, land, and biosphere, estimating that on average approximately 342 watts of solar energy fall on each square meter of Earth over the course of a year.

In this scientific sense, the idea of “current solar income” corresponds to the ongoing solar energy available to the Earth system rather than energy derived from stored geological reserves such as fossil fuels.

== See also ==
- Howard Odum
- Vladimir Ivanovich Vernadsky
- Solar constant
