= Timothy Fuller =

American politician

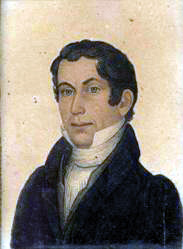

Member of the U.S. House of Representatives from Massachusetts's 4th district
- In office March 4, 1817 – March 3, 1825
- Preceded by: Asahel Stearns
- Succeeded by: Edward Everett

Member of the Massachusetts Senate
- In office 1813-1816

Personal details
- Born: July 11, 1778 Chilmark, Massachusetts
- Died: October 1, 1835 (aged 57) Groton, Massachusetts
- Party: Democratic-Republican
- Education: Harvard University
- Occupation: Lawyer, schoolteacher

Timothy Fuller (July 11, 1778 – October 1, 1835) was a U.S. representative from Massachusetts.

== Life and work ==
Fuller was born in Chilmark, Massachusetts. His father, also named Timothy, the first settled minister of Princeton, Massachusetts, was third in descent, from Thomas, who emigrated from England in 1638. The younger Timothy received a classical education and graduated from Harvard University in 1801 with second honors. He taught at Leicester Academy, then studied law with Levi Lincoln. He was admitted to the bar and commenced practice in Boston. He served as member of the Massachusetts House of Representatives, as a State councilor and served in the Massachusetts State Senate from 1813 to 1816.

Fuller was elected as a Democratic-Republican to the Fifteenth through the Seventeenth Congresses and reelected as an Adams–Clay Republican to the Eighteenth Congress (March 4, 1817 – March 3, 1825). He served as chairman of the Committee on Naval Affairs in the Seventeenth Congress. He was distinguished as an orator, making effective speeches in behalf of the Seminole Indians, and against the Missouri compromise. He was an ardent supporter of John Quincy Adams, and published a pamphlet entitled "The Election for the Presidency Considered," which was widely circulated.

Fuller married Margaret Crane in 1809 and moved to 71 Cherry Street in Cambridgeport, Massachusetts. He was the father of early feminist Margaret Fuller and Unitarian minister Arthur Buckminster Fuller. Through the latter, he is also the great-grandfather of inventor and thinker Buckminster Fuller. and, through Arthur's brother Richard Frederick Fuller, the great-great-great-grandfather of US Treasury Secretary Timothy Geithner. He died suddenly of cholera, intestate and insolvent, in Groton, Massachusetts, on October 1, 1835, and was interred in Mount Auburn Cemetery in Cambridge.

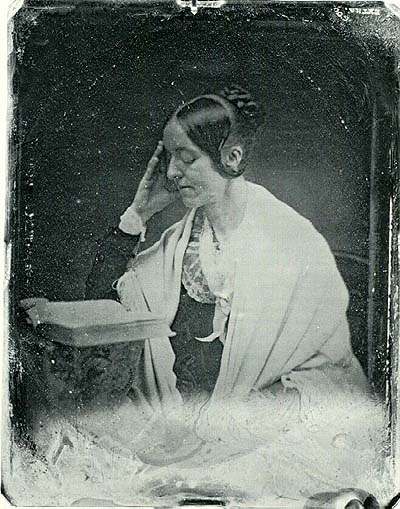
Sarah Margaret [Fuller] Ossoli

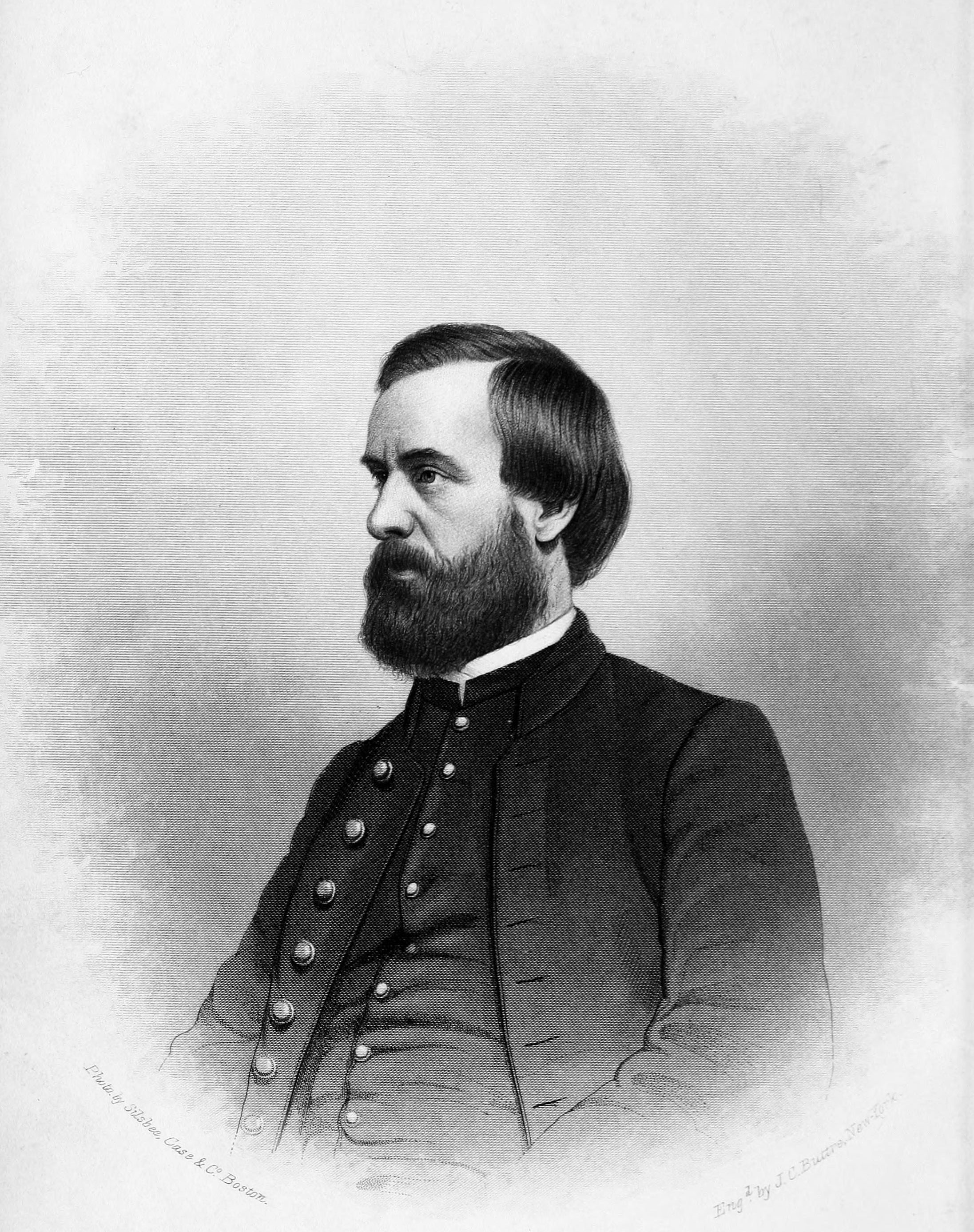
Arthur Buckminster Fuller

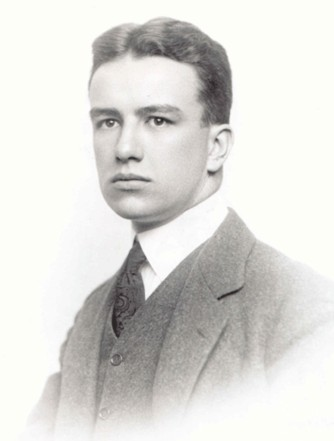
Buckminster Fuller

U.S. House of Representatives
Preceded by Asahel Stearns	Member of the U.S. House of Representatives from Massachusetts's 4th congressional district 1817–1825	Succeeded by Edward Everett
