= Medard Gabel =

American designer, systems theorist and writer

- Occupations: Designer, Social Scientist
- Writing career
- Period: 1970-present
- Notable works: Global Inc. and Designs for a World That Works for All
- Website: bigpicturesmallworld.com

Medard Gabel is the executive director of the non-profit research and development organization EarthGame. He also leads BigPictureSmallWorld, the Global Solutions Lab and Global Solutions Lab Platform. He is the former executive director of the World Game Institute and director of The Cornucopia Project and the Regeneration Project at Rodale Press. He has done work for Tanzania on regenerative agriculture, as well as work in Costa Rica, Spain, The Netherlands, Japan, China, Malaysia and elsewhere. He has written six books on world food and energy problems and solutions, the U.S. food system, multinational corporations, and strategic planning.

Medard Gabel’s seminal 1985 paper on regeneration, "Regenerating America: Meeting the Challenge of Building Local Economies," is the acknowledged first appearance of the idea of regeneration in the social and economic spheres. His prophetic 1975 book, “Energy, Earth and Everyone,” was the first document to point out that renewable energy sources could power the entire world. As proof, the book included the first globally comprehensive inventory and explication of all renewable energy sources, as well as plans for the roll-out of renewable energy and the phase-out of fossil and nuclear fuels. Much of what the book envisioned and promoted has or is happening. His 1979 book, "Ho-Ping: Food for Everyone" is credited as where "regenerative agriculture" was first used, and his Global Inc.—An Atlas of the Multinational Corporation is the first atlas of corporations and their globalization.

Gabel has designed and developed a variety of global problem solving and data visualization tools, such as the World Game Workshop, of which he was the chief architect and developer while the executive director at the World Game Institute, and the Earth Dashboard— the a compete rendering of the vital statistics for “Spaceship Earth” yet developed. He has also developed software applications, such as Global Recall, global databases, such as Global Data Manager, Internet based global simulations, such as NetWorld Game, and games and short films. He has worked as a consultant and/or run workshops for the UN, U.S. Congress, the governments of the Netherlands, Tanzania and Spain, as well as World Bank, UNEP, GM, Motorola, IBM, Chase Manhattan Bank, Exxon, AT&T, DuPont, British Airways, and other major multinational corporations. He worked with Buckminster Fuller for 12 years on a variety of projects—from work on the foundations of a Regenerative Resource Industry to participating in the first and designing and running subsequent World Game Workshops, to organizing Fuller’s archives, arranging the 42-hour video lecture by Buckminster Fuller presenting “everything I know,” and designing multiple versions of the World Game, including the World Climate Change Game, World Environment Game, World Diversity Game, and the online NetWorld Game. He is now working on the AI-assisted problem-solving/solutions-development Global Solutions Lab Platform with colleagues from the World Game Institute and the Global Solutions Lab, and writing a number of books.

== Published works ==
- Tools for Changing the World— A Design Science Primer (Amazon KDP, 2024) ISBN 979-8346075974
- Designs for a World That Works for All: Solutions & Strategies for Meeting the World’s Needs Volumes I-III (Amazon KDP, 2020, 2021) ISBN 979-8-6343-4418-8 ISBN 979-8-6343-6236-6 ISBN 979-8-5960-0069-6
- Design Science Primer (Amazon KDP, 2016) ISBN 978-1-5143-6511-3
- Global Inc.: An Atlas of Global Corporations (New Press 2003) ISBN 1-56584-727-X
- Empty Breadbasket? The Coming Challenge to America's Food Supply and What We Can Do About It (Cornucopia Project, Rodale Press 1981)
- Energy, Earth, and Everyone (Doubleday; Revised edition 1980) ISBN 0-385-14081-9
- Ho-ping: Food for Everyone (Anchor Press/Doubleday; 1st ed edition 1979) ISBN 0-385-14082-7
- Environmental Design Science Primer (Advocate Press/Department of Health, Education and Welfare, Division of Environmental Education, 1975) OCLC 5750315
