= Barry Farrell =

American journalist (1935–1984)

Barry Farrell (1935 – December 10, 1984) was an American journalist and editor who wrote for magazines. He worked for Time, Life and Harper's Magazine in the 1960s and 1970s. He also wrote a book about Roald Dahl and Patricia Neal entitled Pat and Roald.

== Early life ==
Farrell was a native of Seattle, Washington. He graduated from the University of Washington in 1956, served in the U.S. Army, and started his writing career at the Seattle Post-Intelligencer.

== Magazine career ==
Farrell was hired by Time magazine in 1960, working first in San Francisco then in New York where he became the magazine's music writer. He later served as Time's correspondent in Paris and became a staff writer for its sister publication Life in 1968, where he wrote a column every other week, alternating with Joan Didion. He moved to Los Angeles in the early 1970s where he was West Coast Editor of Harper's. He also taught writing, including at the University of California, Santa Barbara.

Time cover stories by Farrell included symphony conductor Bruno Walter (1963), jazz pianist Thelonious Monk (1964) and French actress Jeanne Moreau (1965).

In 1968, he signed the “Writers and Editors War Tax Protest” pledge and refused to pay taxes in protest against the Vietnam War.

Farrell interviewed Buckminster Fuller for Playboy magazine in February 1972. He wrote Pat and Roald, the biographical story of author Roald Dahl and his wife, actress Patricia Neal. A collection of his essays, How I Got to Be This Hip, edited by Steve Hawk, was published in 1999. He was a close friend of Joan Didion and her husband, John Gregory Dunne.

== Death in Los Angeles ==
Farrell died at age 49 in the Veterans Administration Hospital, West Los Angeles in 1984, after suffering a heart attack. He was survived by his wife, Marcia; his daughters, Anne, Joan and Lily; his mother, Marietta Farrell of Seattle; a brother, Dr. Dennis Farrell of San Francisco, and a sister, Colleen Vescia, of Palo Alto, Calif. .

== Publications ==
=== Books ===
- Pat and Roald, publisher Kingsport Press, 1969
- How I Got to be This Hip, Steve Hawk editor, publisher WSP, 1999, ISBN 0-671-02810-3, LCCN: 00268647

=== Articles ===
- "The candidate from Disneyland" (Ronald Reagan) -February 1976
- "Celebrity market" (Deceptive advertising; Endorsements in advertising) -December 1975
- "George in the afternoon" (George Segal) -August 1975
- "A let-burn situation" (Fires; Los Angeles; Police; Political violence; Terrorists) -September 1974
- "California inquest" (Manson Family killings, Sirhan Bishara Sirhan -May 1974
- "The Ellsberg mask" (Daniel Ellsberg) -October 1973
- "Desert manners" (Fiction) -August 1976
