= R. Buckminster Fuller and Anne Hewlett Dome Home =

Historic house in Illinois, United States

- U.S. National Register of Historic Places
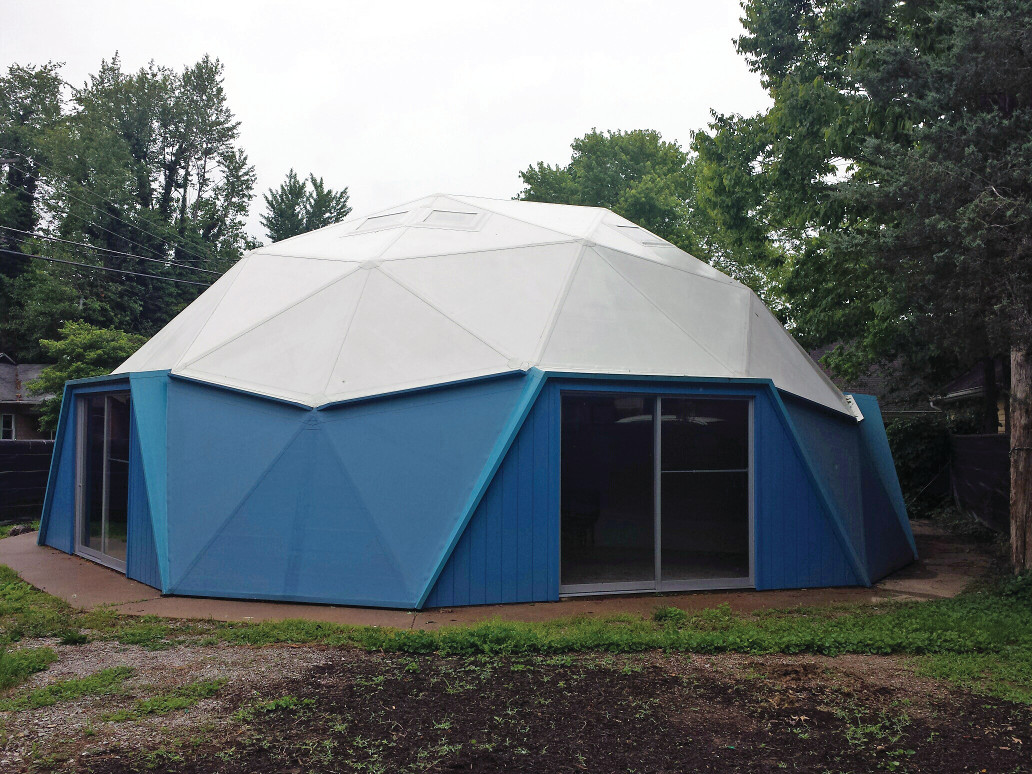
- View from the south after completion of the exterior preservation in late 2014

- Location within Illinois Location within the United States
- Location: 407 S. Forest Ave., Carbondale, Illinois
- Coordinates: 37°43′23.22″N 89°13′30.76″W
- Area: less than one acre
- Architect: Fuller, R. Buckminster; et al.
- Architectural style: Modern Movement
- NRHP reference No.: 06000012
- Added to NRHP: February 9, 2006

The R. Buckminster Fuller and Anne Hewlett Dome Home, located at 407 S. Forest Ave. in Carbondale, Illinois, is a geodesic dome house which was the residence of Buckminster Fuller from 1960 to 1971. The house, inhabited by Fuller while he taught at Southern Illinois University, was the only geodesic dome Fuller lived in, as well as the only property he ever owned. Fuller, a prolific architect and engineer, popularized the geodesic dome as a building design, and his house was one of the first geodesic dome residences to be constructed. The home was built and designed by Al Miller of the Pease Woodworking Company. While living in the home, Fuller was awarded nine patents, published eleven books, and designed the Montreal Biosphère, one of his most famous works.

The house was added to the National Register of Historic Places on February 9, 2006.

== Non-profit ==
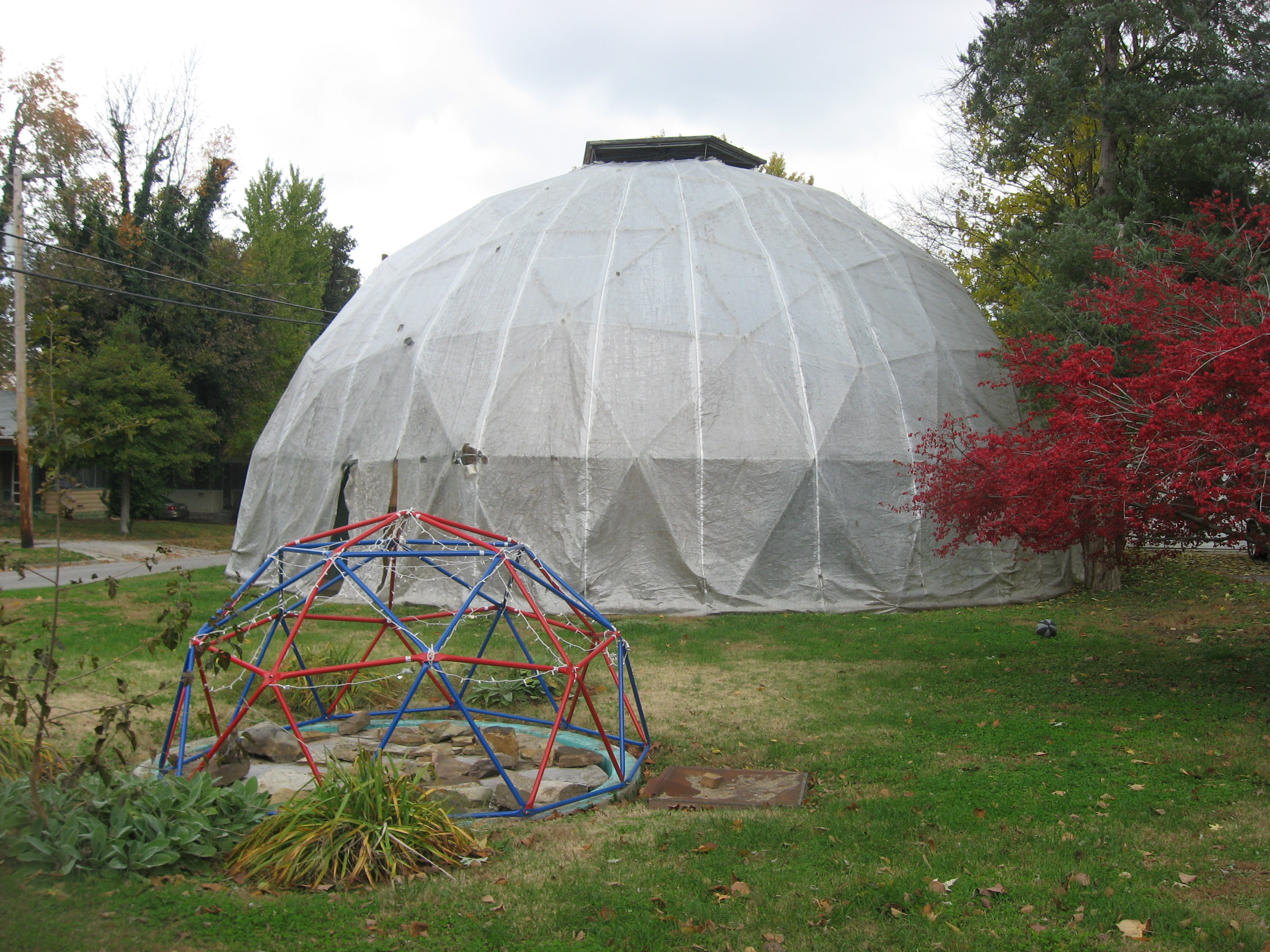
Dome undergoing renovations in 2013

The Fuller Dome is a project of RBF Dome NFP, a non-profit organization dedicated to honoring Buckminster Fuller's legacy. The board's vision is to further Bucky's work, principles, and commitment to addressing humanity's most basic needs. This is done by preserving his artifacts and providing programming in the spirit of Fuller's hope for "omni-successful education and sustenance for all of humanity."

The Fuller Dome is led by a board of directors composed of educators, architects, designers, artists, professors emeriti, community organizers and leaders representing a diverse confluence of individuals who are dedicated to manifesting Bucky's ideals today.
