= Arthur Buckminster Fuller =

Unitarian clergyman (1822–1862)

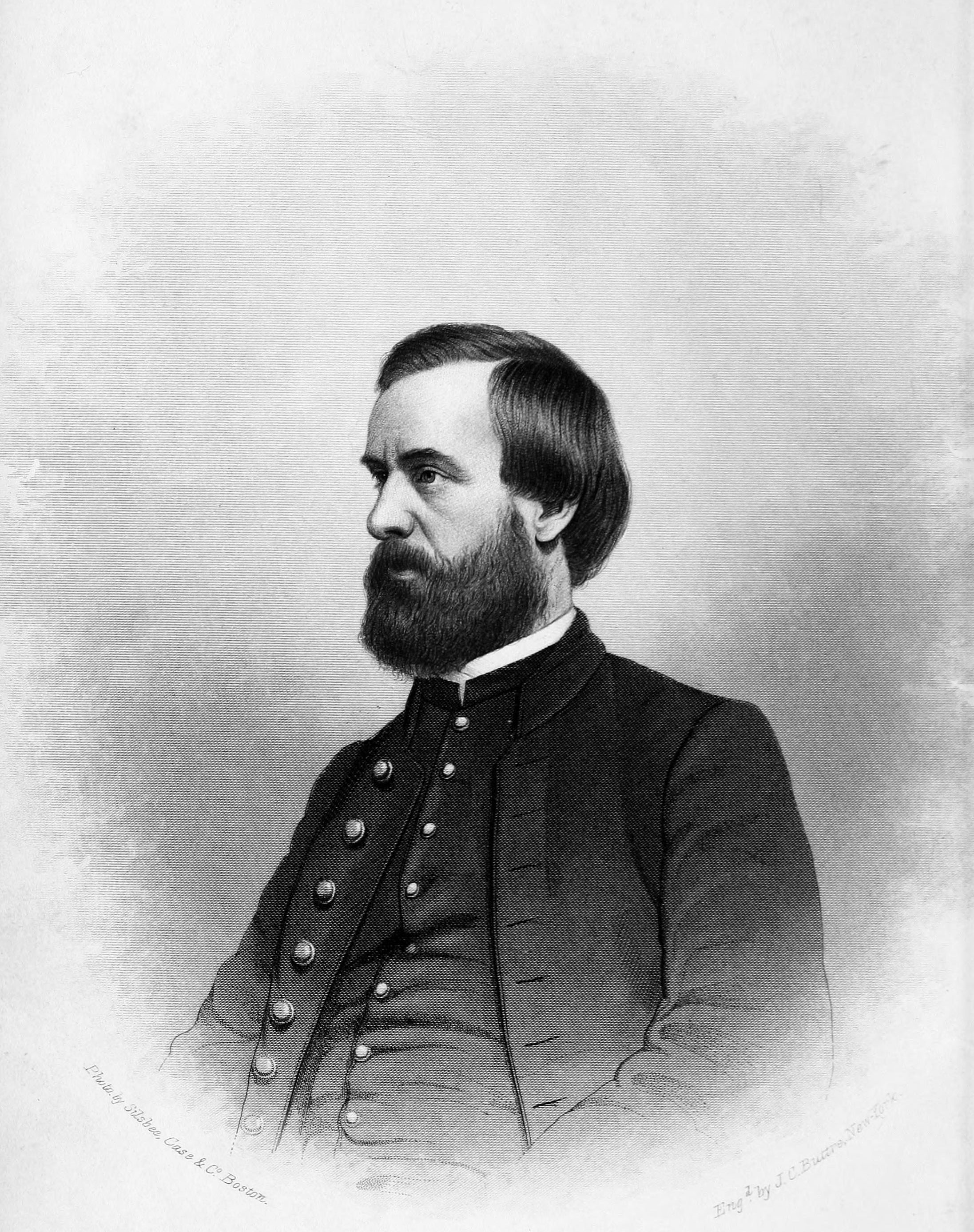
- Born: August 10, 1822; Cambridgeport, Massachusetts
- Died: December 11, 1862 (aged 40)

Signature
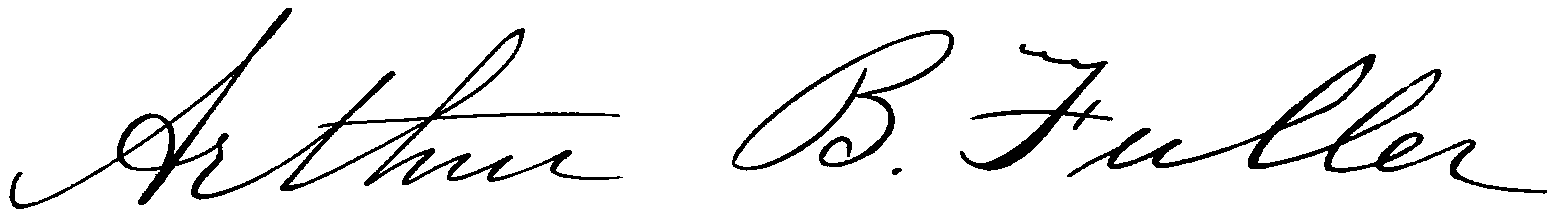

Arthur Buckminster Fuller (August 10, 1822 – December 11, 1862) was a Unitarian clergyman of the United States.

== Biography ==
Fuller was born in Cambridgeport, Massachusetts on August 10, 1822. He was a son of United States Congressman Timothy Fuller and was prepared for college by his sister Margaret Fuller. He graduated from Harvard College in 1843, and studied in the Harvard Divinity School. For some years, he was a teacher and missionary in Illinois, after which he held pastorates in Manchester, New Hampshire (1848–1853), Boston (new North Church; 1853–1859) and Watertown, Massachusetts (until 1861).

In the American Civil War, he became chaplain to the Sixteenth Massachusetts Volunteer Infantry on August 1, 1861. He was honorably discharged on December 10, 1862, on account of failing health. On the day following his discharge, being present at the Battle of Fredericksburg, he volunteered to join the Nineteenth Massachusetts in crossing the Rappahannock River and was shot to death while attempting to drive the Confederate sharpshooters out of the city.

Inventor Buckminster Fuller was a grandson of his.

== Writings ==
He edited several works of his sister Margaret. Among his other publications are:

- Sabbath-School Manual of Christian Doctrine and Institutions (Boston, 1850)
- Historical Discourse delivered in the New North Church, Boston, 1 October 1854
- Liberty versus Romanism, two discourses (1859)
