= Fly's Eye Dome =

Prototype house designed by R. Buckminster Fuller

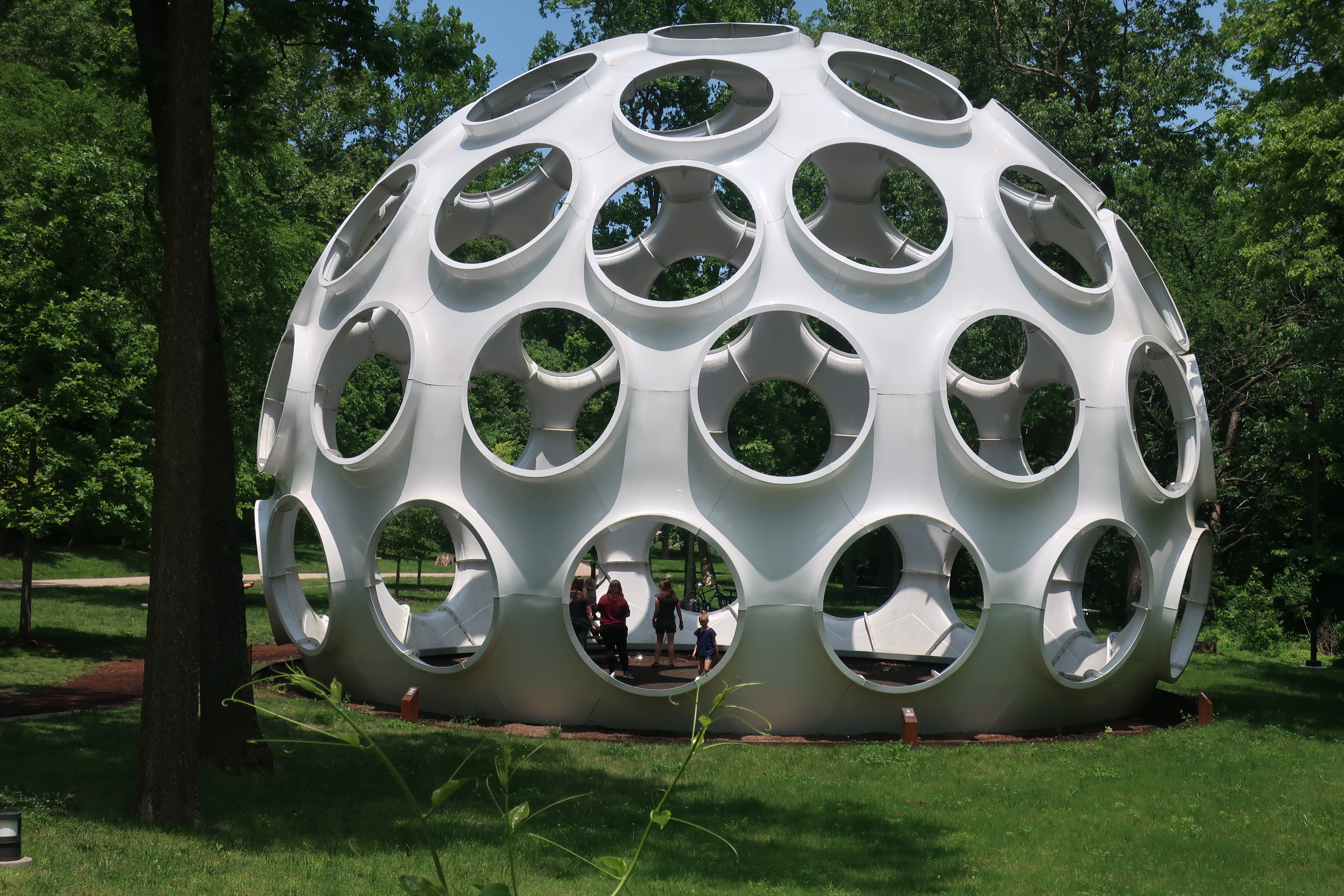
Fly's Eye Dome at Crystal Bridges Museum

The Fly's Eye Dome was a structure designed in 1965 by R. Buckminster Fuller. Inspired by the eye of a fly, Fuller designed the dome as his idea of the affordable, portable home of the future, with windows and openings in the dome to hold solar panels and systems for water collection, thus allowing the dome to be self sufficient. Before his death in 1983, he hand-built three prototypes of the design:

- A 3.8-meter (12 ft) prototype is currently owned by Norman Foster.
- A 7-meter (23 ft) prototype is currently owned by Craig Robins.
- A 15-meter (49 ft) prototype acquired by Crystal Bridges Museum of American Art in Bentonville, Arkansas and installed in 2017.

A new version of the Fly's Eye Dome standing at 7 meters was built in 2014 in Miami under guidance from The Buckminster Fuller Institute.
