= Buckminster Fuller =

American philosopher, architect and inventor (1895–1983)

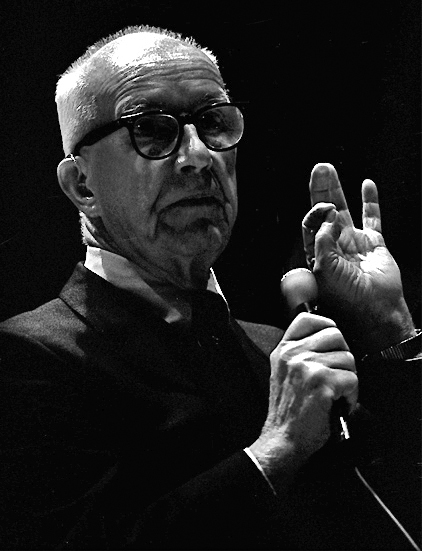
- Fuller in 1972
- Born: Richard Buckminster Fuller Jr. July 12, 1895; Milton, Massachusetts, U.S.
- Died: July 1, 1983 (aged 87); Los Angeles, California, U.S.
- Education: Harvard University (expelled)
- Occupations: Designer; author; inventor
- Spouse: Anne Hewlett (m. 1917)
- Children: 2, including Allegra Fuller Snyder
- Awards: Presidential Medal of Freedom (1983)
- Buildings: Geodesic dome (1940s)
- Projects: Dymaxion house (1928)
- Family: Timothy Fuller (great-grandfather); Arthur Buckminster Fuller (grandfather); Margaret Fuller (grandaunt); James Monroe Hewlett (father-in-law)

Philosophical work
- Era: 20th-century philosophy
- Region: Western philosophy; American philosophy
- Main interests: Systems theory
- Notable works: Dymaxion Chronofile (1920–1983); Nine Chains to the Moon (1938); Operating Manual for Spaceship Earth (1968); Critical Path (1981)
- Notable ideas: Cloud Nine (sphere); Current solar income; Design science; Energy slave; Ephemeralization; Dymaxion; car; house; map; Geoscope; Space frame; Spaceship earth; Synergetics; Tensegrity; World Game

Richard Buckminster Fuller Jr. (/ˈfʊlər/; July 12, 1895 – July 1, 1983) was an American architect, systems theorist, writer, designer, inventor, philosopher, and futurist. He styled his name as R. Buckminster Fuller in his writings, publishing more than 30 books and coining or popularizing such terms as "Spaceship Earth", "Dymaxion" (e.g., Dymaxion house, Dymaxion car, Dymaxion map), "ephemeralization", "synergetics", and "tensegrity".

Fuller developed numerous inventions, mainly architectural designs, and popularized the widely known geodesic dome; carbon molecules known as fullerenes were later named by scientists for their structural and mathematical resemblance to geodesic spheres. He also served as the second World President of Mensa International from 1974 to 1983.

Fuller was awarded 28 United States patents and many honorary doctorates. In 1960, he was awarded the Frank P. Brown Medal from the Franklin Institute. He was elected an honorary member of Phi Beta Kappa in 1967, on the occasion of the 50-year reunion of his Harvard class of 1917 (from which he had been expelled in his first year). He was elected a Fellow of the American Academy of Arts and Sciences in 1968. The same year, he was elected into the National Academy of Design as an Associate member. He became a full Academician in 1970, and he received the Gold Medal award from the American Institute of Architects the same year. Also in 1970, Fuller received the title of Master Architect from Alpha Rho Chi (APX), the national fraternity for architecture and the allied arts. In 1976, he received the St. Louis Literary Award from the Saint Louis University Library Associates. In 1977, he received the Golden Plate Award of the American Academy of Achievement. He also received numerous other awards, including the Presidential Medal of Freedom, presented to him on February 23, 1983, by President Ronald Reagan.

== Life and work ==
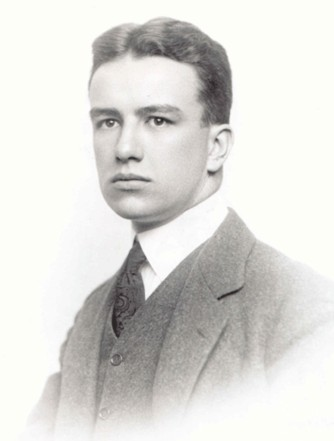
Fuller c. 1910

Fuller was born on July 12, 1895, in Milton, Massachusetts, the son of Richard Buckminster Fuller, a prosperous leather and tea merchant, and Caroline Wolcott Andrews. He was a grand-nephew of Margaret Fuller, an American journalist, critic, and women's rights advocate associated with the American transcendentalism movement. The unusual middle name, Buckminster, was an ancestral family name. As a child, Richard Buckminster Fuller tried numerous variations of his name. He used to sign his name differently each year in the guest register of his family summer vacation home at Bear Island, Maine. He finally settled on R. Buckminster Fuller.

Fuller spent much of his youth on Bear Island, in Penobscot Bay off the coast of Maine. He attended Froebelian Kindergarten. He was dissatisfied with the way geometry was taught in school, disagreeing with the notions that a chalk dot on the blackboard represented an "empty" mathematical point, or that a line could stretch off to infinity. To him these were illogical, and led to his work on synergetics. He often made items from materials he found in the woods, and sometimes made his own tools. He experimented with designing a new apparatus for human propulsion of small boats. By age 12, he had invented a 'push pull' system for propelling a rowboat by use of an inverted umbrella connected to the transom with a simple oar lock which allowed the user to face forward to point the boat toward its destination. Later in life, Fuller took exception to the term "invention."

Years later, he decided that this sort of experience had provided him with not only an interest in design, but also a habit of being familiar with and knowledgeable about the materials that his later projects would require. Fuller earned a machinist's certification, and knew how to use the press brake, stretch press, and other tools and equipment used in the sheet metal trade.

=== Education ===
Fuller attended Milton Academy in Massachusetts, and after that began studying at Harvard University, where he was affiliated with Adams House. He was expelled from Harvard twice: first for spending all his money partying with a vaudeville troupe, and then, after having been readmitted, for his "irresponsibility and lack of interest." By his own appraisal, he was a non-conforming misfit in the fraternity environment.

=== Wartime experience ===
Between his sessions at Harvard, Fuller worked in Canada as a mechanic in a textile mill, and later as a laborer in the meat-packing industry.

He also served in the U.S. Navy in World War I, as a shipboard radio operator, as an editor of a publication, and as commander of the crash rescue boat USS Inca. After discharge, he worked again in the meat-packing industry, acquiring management experience.

In 1917, he married Anne Hewlett. During the early 1920s, he and his father-in-law developed the Stockade Building System for producing lightweight, weatherproof, and fireproof housing—although the company would ultimately fail in 1927.

=== Depression and epiphany ===
Fuller recalled 1927 as a pivotal year of his life. His daughter Alexandra had died in 1922 of complications from polio and spinal meningitis just before her fourth birthday. Barry Katz, a Stanford University scholar who wrote about Fuller, found signs that around this time in his life Fuller had developed depression and anxiety. Fuller dwelled on his daughter's death, suspecting that it was connected with the Fullers' damp and drafty living conditions. This provided motivation for Fuller's involvement in Stockade Building Systems, a business which aimed to provide affordable, efficient housing.

In 1927, at age 32, Fuller lost his job as president of Stockade. The Fuller family had no savings, and the birth of their daughter Allegra in 1927 added to the financial challenges. Fuller drank heavily and reflected upon the solution to his family's struggles on long walks around Chicago. During the autumn of 1927, Fuller contemplated suicide by drowning in Lake Michigan, so that his family could benefit from a life insurance payment.

Fuller said that he had experienced a profound incident which would provide direction and purpose for his life. He felt as though he was suspended several feet above the ground enclosed in a white sphere of light. A voice spoke directly to Fuller, and declared:

From now on you need never await temporal attestation to your thought. You think the truth. You do not have the right to eliminate yourself. You do not belong to you. You belong to the Universe. Your significance will remain forever obscure to you, but you may assume that you are fulfilling your role if you apply yourself to converting your experiences to the highest advantage of others.

Fuller stated that this experience led to a profound re-examination of his life. He ultimately chose to embark on "an experiment, to find what a single individual could contribute to changing the world and benefiting all humanity."

Speaking to audiences later in life, Fuller would frequently recount the story of his Lake Michigan experience, and its transformative impact on his life.

=== Recovery ===
In 1927, Fuller resolved to think independently which included a commitment to "the search for the principles governing the universe and [to] help advance the evolution of humanity in accordance with them ... finding ways of doing more with less to the end that all people everywhere can have more and more." By 1928, Fuller was living in Greenwich Village and spending much of his time at the popular café Romany Marie's, where he had spent an evening in conversation with Marie and Eugene O'Neill several years earlier. Fuller accepted a job decorating the interior of the café in exchange for meals, giving informal lectures several times a week, and models of the Dymaxion house were exhibited at the café. Isamu Noguchi arrived during 1929—Constantin Brâncuși, an old friend of Marie's, had directed him there—and Noguchi and Fuller were soon collaborating on several projects, including the modeling of the Dymaxion car based on recent work by Aurel Persu. It was the beginning of their lifelong friendship.

=== Geodesic domes ===
Fuller taught at Black Mountain College in North Carolina during the summers of 1948 and 1949, serving as its Summer Institute director in 1949. Fuller had been shy and withdrawn, but he was persuaded to participate in a theatrical performance of Erik Satie's Le piège de Méduse produced by John Cage, who was also teaching at Black Mountain. During rehearsals, under the tutelage of Arthur Penn, then a student at Black Mountain, Fuller broke through his inhibitions to become confident as a performer and speaker.

At Black Mountain, with the support of a group of professors and students, he began reinventing a project that would make him famous: the geodesic dome. Although the geodesic dome had been created, built and awarded a German patent on June 19, 1925, by Dr. Walther Bauersfeld, Fuller was awarded United States patents. Fuller's patent application made no mention of Bauersfeld's self-supporting dome built some 26 years prior. Although Fuller undoubtedly popularized this type of structure he is mistakenly given credit for its design.

One of his early models was first constructed in 1945 at Bennington College in Vermont, where he lectured often. Although Bauersfeld's dome could support a full skin of concrete it was not until 1949 that Fuller erected a geodesic dome building that could sustain its own weight with no practical limits. It was 4.3 meters (14 feet) in diameter and constructed of aluminium aircraft tubing and a vinyl-plastic skin, in the form of an icosahedron. To prove his design, Fuller suspended from the structure's framework several students who had helped him build it. The U.S. government recognized the importance of this work, and employed his firm Geodesics, Inc. in Raleigh, North Carolina, to make small domes for the Marines. Within a few years, there were thousands of such domes around the world.

Fuller's first "continuous tension – discontinuous compression" geodesic dome (full sphere in this case) was constructed at the University of Oregon Architecture School in 1959 with the help of students. These continuous tension – discontinuous compression structures featured single force compression members (no flexure or bending moments) that did not touch each other and were 'suspended' by the tensional members.

=== Dymaxion Chronofile ===
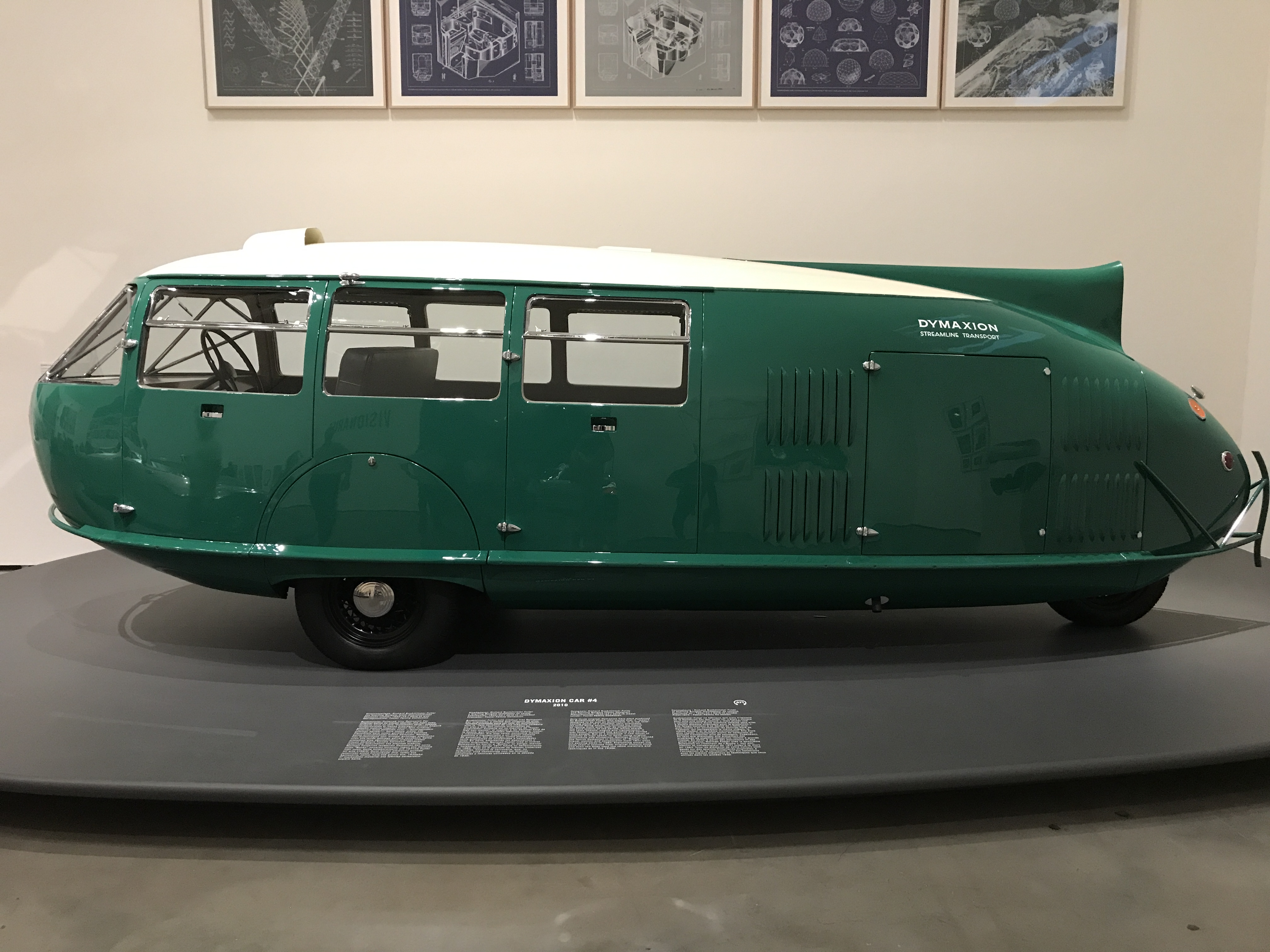
A 1933 Dymaxion prototype

For half of a century, Fuller developed many ideas, designs, and inventions, particularly regarding practical, inexpensive shelter and transportation. He documented his life, philosophy, and ideas scrupulously by a daily diary (later called the Dymaxion Chronofile), and by twenty-eight publications. Fuller financed some of his experiments with inherited funds, sometimes augmented by funds invested by his collaborators, one example being the Dymaxion car project.

=== World stage ===
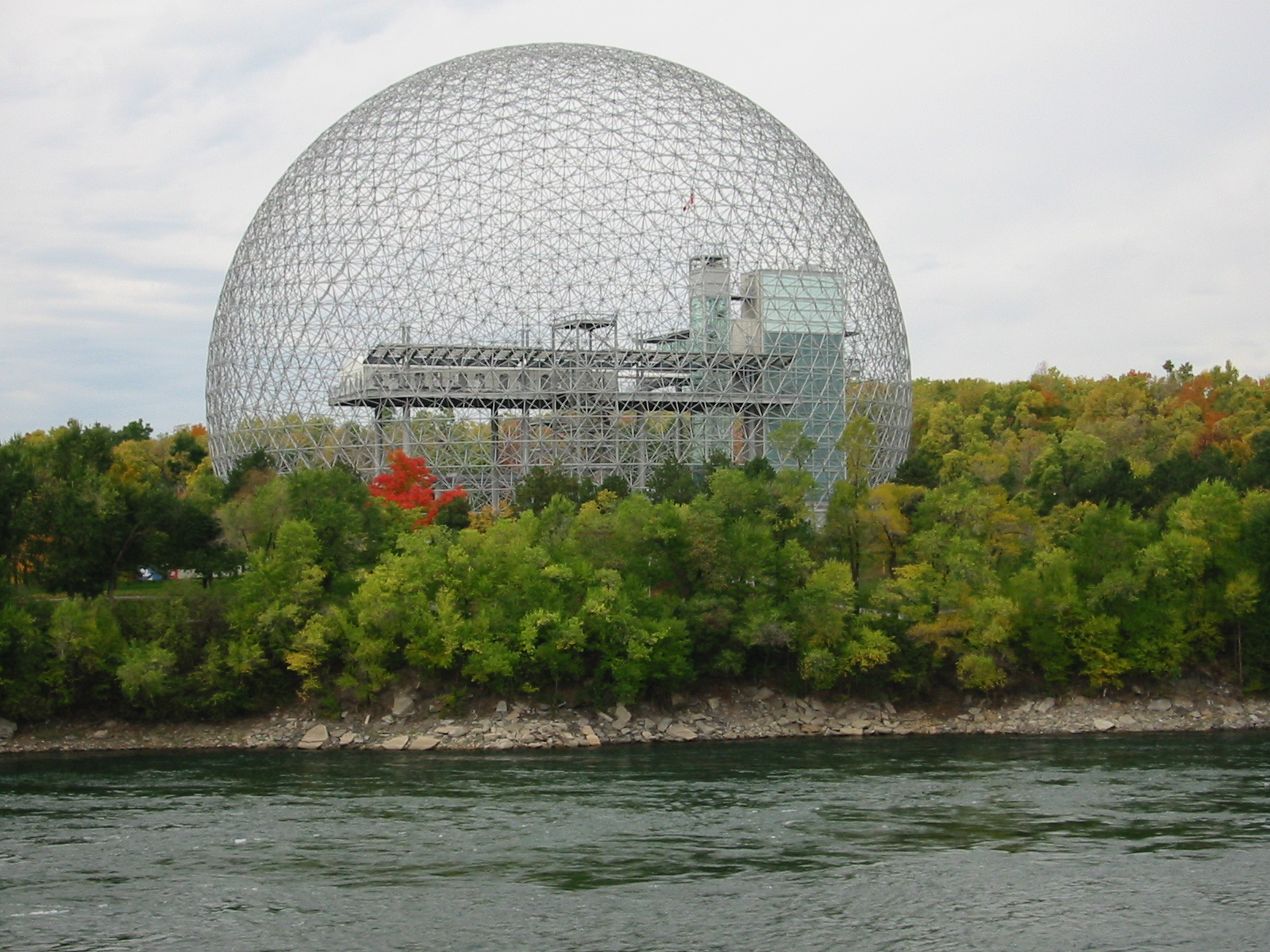
The Montreal Biosphère by Buckminster Fuller, 1967

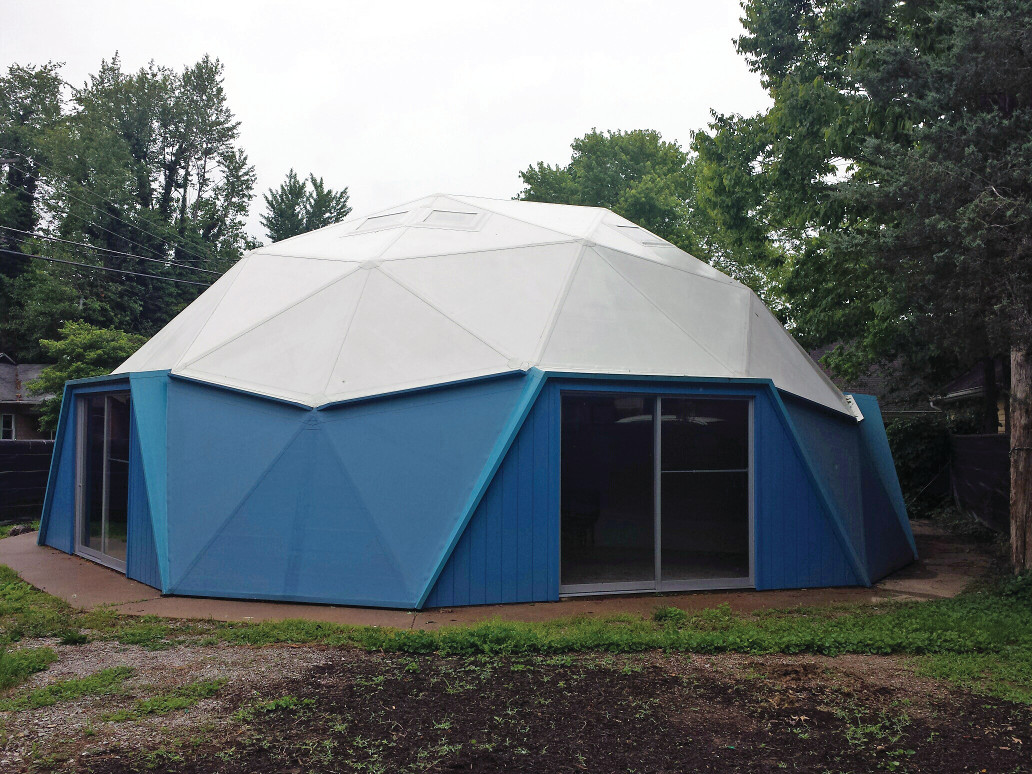
Fuller's home in Carbondale, Illinois

International recognition began with the success of huge geodesic domes during the 1950s. Fuller lectured at North Carolina State University in Raleigh in 1949, where he met James Fitzgibbon, who would become a close friend and colleague. Fitzgibbon was director of Geodesics, Inc. and Synergetics, Inc. the first licensees to design geodesic domes. Thomas C. Howard was lead designer, architect, and engineer for both companies. Richard Lewontin, a new faculty member in population genetics at North Carolina State University, provided Fuller with computer calculations for the lengths of the domes' edges.

Fuller began working with architect Shoji Sadao in 1954, together designing a hypothetical Dome over Manhattan in 1960, and in 1964 they co-founded the architectural firm Fuller & Sadao Inc., whose first project was to design the large geodesic dome for the U.S. Pavilion at Expo 67 in Montreal. This building is now the "Montreal Biosphère". In 1962, the artist and searcher John McHale wrote the first monograph on Fuller, published by George Braziller in New York.

After employing several Southern Illinois University Carbondale (SIU) graduate students to rebuild his models following an apartment fire in the summer of 1959, Fuller was recruited by longtime friend Harold Cohen to serve as a research professor of "design science exploration" at the institution's School of Art and Design. According to SIU architecture professor Jon Davey, the position was "unlike most faculty appointments ... more a celebrity role than a teaching job" in which Fuller offered few courses and was only stipulated to spend two months per year on campus. Nevertheless, his time in Carbondale was "extremely productive", and Fuller was promoted to university professor in 1968 and distinguished university professor in 1972.

Working as a designer, scientist, developer, and writer, he continued to lecture for many years around the world. He collaborated at SIU with John McHale. In 1965, they inaugurated the World Design Science Decade (1965 to 1975) at the meeting of the International Union of Architects in Paris, which was, in Fuller's own words, devoted to "applying the principles of science to solving the problems of humanity."

From 1972 until retiring as university professor emeritus in 1975, Fuller held a joint appointment at Southern Illinois University Edwardsville, where he had designed the dome for the campus Religious Center in 1971. During this period, he also held a joint fellowship at a consortium of Philadelphia-area institutions, including the University of Pennsylvania, Bryn Mawr College, Haverford College, Swarthmore College, and the University City Science Center; as a result of this affiliation, the University of Pennsylvania appointed him university professor emeritus in 1975.

Fuller believed human societies would soon rely mainly on renewable sources of energy, such as solar- and wind-derived electricity. He hoped for an age of "omni-successful education and sustenance of all humanity." Fuller referred to himself as "the property of universe" and during one radio interview he gave later in life, declared himself and his work "the property of all humanity." For his lifetime of work, the American Humanist Association named him the 1969 Humanist of the Year.

In 1976, Fuller was a key participant at UN Habitat I, the first UN forum on human settlements, held in Vancouver, British Columbia, Canada.

=== Last filmed appearance ===
Fuller's last filmed interview took place on June 21, 1983, in which he spoke at Norman Foster's Royal Gold Medal for architecture ceremony. His speech can be watched in the archives of the AA School of Architecture, in which he spoke after Sir Robert Sainsbury's introductory speech and Foster's keynote address.

=== Death ===
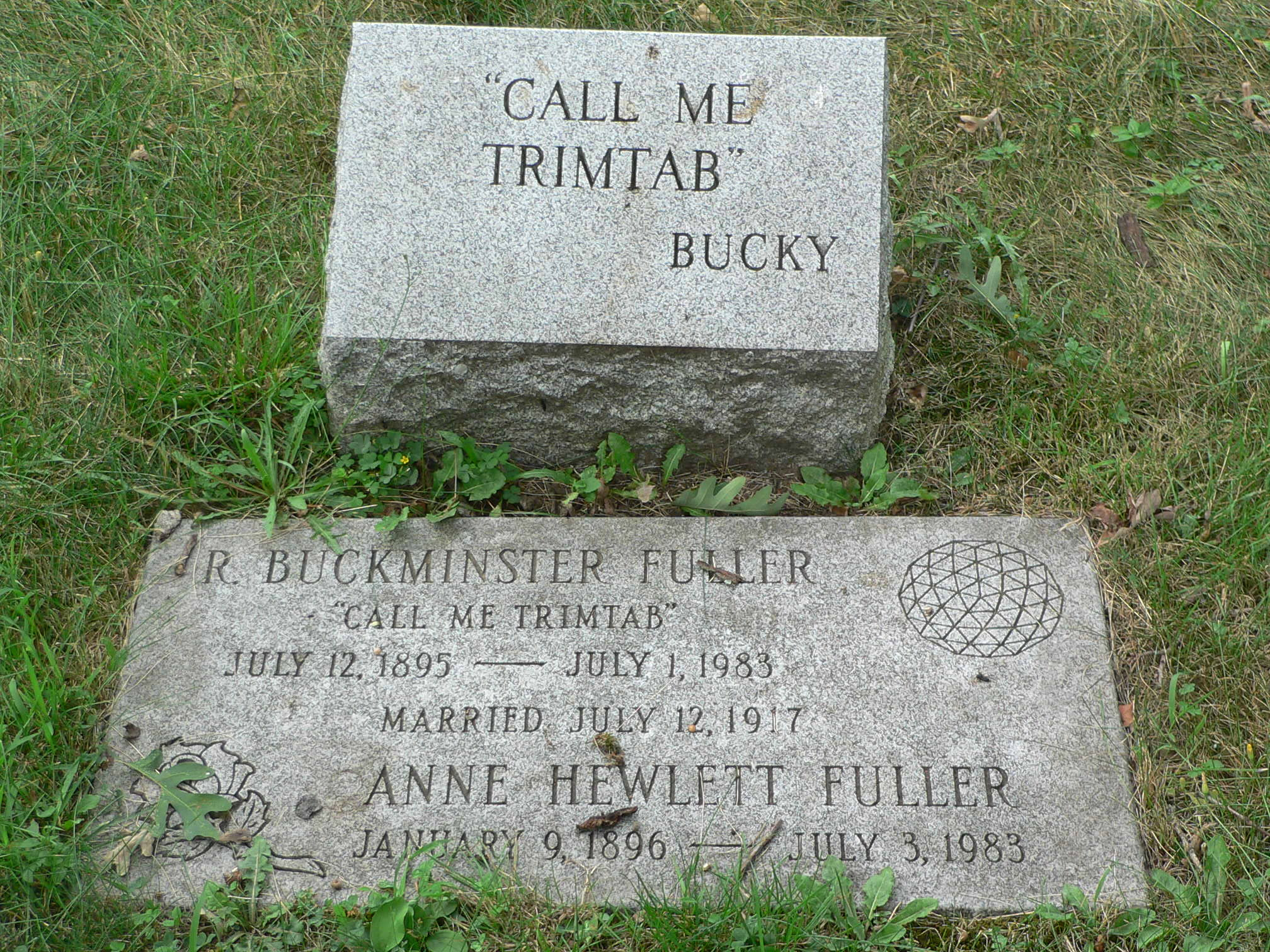
Gravestone (see Trim tab)

In the year of his death, Fuller described himself as follows:

Guinea Pig B:
I am now close to 88 and I am confident that the only thing important about me is that I am an average healthy human. I am also a living case history of a thoroughly documented, half-century, search-and-research project designed to discover what, if anything, an unknown, moneyless individual, with a dependent wife and newborn child, might be able to do effectively on behalf of all humanity that could not be accomplished by great nations, great religions or private enterprise, no matter how rich or powerfully armed.

Fuller died on July 1, 1983, 11 days before his 88th birthday. During the period leading up to his death, his wife had been lying comatose in a Los Angeles hospital, dying of cancer. It was while visiting her there that he exclaimed, at a certain point: "She is squeezing my hand!" He then stood up, had a heart attack, and died an hour later, at age 87. His wife of 66 years died 36 hours later. They are buried in Mount Auburn Cemetery in Cambridge, Massachusetts. His gravestone carries the phrase Trim tab.

== Philosophy ==
Buckminster Fuller was a Unitarian, and, like his grandfather Arthur Buckminster Fuller (brother of Margaret Fuller), a Unitarian minister. Fuller was also an early environmental activist, aware of Earth's finite resources, and promoted a principle he termed "ephemeralization", which, according to futurist and Fuller disciple Stewart Brand, was defined as "doing more with less". Resources and waste from crude, inefficient products could be recycled into making more valuable products, thus increasing the efficiency of the entire process. Fuller also coined the word synergetics, a catch-all term used broadly for communicating experiences using geometric concepts, and more specifically, the empirical study of systems in transformation; his focus was on total system behavior unpredicted by the behavior of any isolated components.

Fuller was a pioneer in thinking globally and explored energy and material efficiency in the fields of architecture, engineering, and design. In his book Critical Path (1981) he cited the opinion of François de Chadenèdes (1920–1999) that petroleum, from the standpoint of its replacement cost in our current energy "budget" (essentially, the net incoming solar flux), had cost nature "over a million dollars" per U.S. gallon ($300,000 per litre) to produce. From this point of view, its use as a transportation fuel by people commuting to work represents a huge net loss compared to their actual earnings. An encapsulation quotation of his views might best be summed up as: "There is no energy crisis, only a crisis of ignorance."

Though Fuller was concerned about sustainability and human survival under the existing socioeconomic system, he remained optimistic about humanity's future. Defining wealth in terms of knowledge as the "technological ability to protect, nurture, support, and accommodate all growth needs of life", his analysis of the condition of "Spaceship Earth" caused him to conclude that at a certain time during the 1970s, humanity had attained an unprecedented state. He was convinced that the accumulation of relevant knowledge, combined with the quantities of major recyclable resources that had already been extracted from the earth, had attained a critical level, such that competition for necessities had become unnecessary. Cooperation had become the optimum survival strategy. He declared: "selfishness is unnecessary and hence-forth unrationalizable ... War is obsolete." He criticized previous utopian schemes as too exclusive and thought this was a major source of their failure. To work, he felt that a utopia needed to include everyone.

Fuller was influenced by Alfred Korzybski's idea of general semantics. In the 1950s, Fuller attended seminars and workshops organized by the Institute of General Semantics, and he delivered the annual Alfred Korzybski Memorial Lecture in 1955. Korzybski is mentioned in the Introduction of his book Synergetics. The two shared a remarkable amount of similarity in their general semantics formulations.

In his 1970 book, I Seem To Be a Verb, he wrote: "I live on Earth at present, and I don't know what I am. I know that I am not a category. I am not a thing—a noun. I seem to be a verb, an evolutionary process—an integral function of the universe."

Fuller wrote that the universe's natural analytic geometry was based on tetrahedra arrays. He developed this in several ways, from the close-packing of spheres and the number of compressive or tensile members required to stabilize an object in space. One confirming result was that the strongest possible homogeneous truss is cyclically tetrahedral.

He had become a guru of the design, architecture, and "alternative" communities, such as Drop City, the community of experimental artists to whom he awarded the 1966 "Dymaxion Award" for "poetically economic" domed living structures.

== Major design projects ==
A geodesic sphere

=== The geodesic dome ===
Fuller was most famous for his lattice shell structures – geodesic domes, which have been used as parts of military radar stations, civic buildings, environmental protest camps, and exhibition attractions. An examination of the geodesic design by Walther Bauersfeld for the Zeiss-Planetarium, built some 28 years prior to Fuller's work, reveals that Fuller's Geodesic Dome patent (U.S. 2,682,235; awarded in 1954) is the same design as Bauersfeld's.

Their construction is based on extending some basic principles to build simple "tensegrity" structures (tetrahedron, octahedron, and the closest packing of spheres), making them lightweight and stable. The geodesic dome was a result of Fuller's exploration of nature's constructing principles to find design solutions. The Fuller Dome is referenced in the Hugo Award-winning 1968 novel Stand on Zanzibar by John Brunner, in which a geodesic dome is said to cover the entire island of Manhattan, and it floats on air due to the hot-air balloon effect of the large air-mass under the dome (and perhaps its construction of lightweight materials).

=== Transportation ===
The Omni-Media-Transport:
With such a vehicle at our disposal, [Fuller] felt that human travel, like that of birds, would no longer be confined to airports, roads, and other bureaucratic boundaries, and that autonomous free-thinking human beings could live and prosper wherever they chose.

— Lloyd S. Sieden, Bucky Fuller's Universe, 2000

To his young daughter Allegra:

Fuller described the Dymaxion as a "zoom-mobile, explaining that it could hop off the road at will, fly about, then, as deftly as a bird, settle back into a place in traffic".

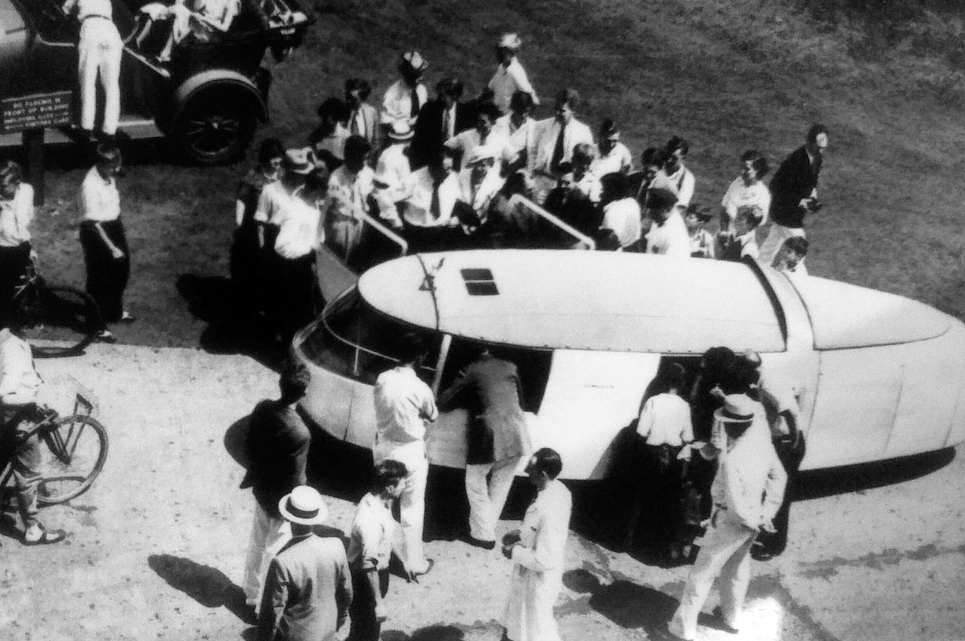
The Dymaxion car, c. 1933, artist Diego Rivera shown entering the car, carrying coat

The Dymaxion car was a vehicle designed by Fuller, featured prominently at Chicago's 1933-1934 Century of Progress World's Fair. During the Great Depression, Fuller formed the Dymaxion Corporation and built three prototypes with noted naval architect Starling Burgess and a team of 27 workmen — using donated money as well as a family inheritance.

Fuller associated the word Dymaxion, a blend of the words dynamic, maximum, and tension to sum up the goal of his study, "maximum gain of advantage from minimal energy input".

The Dymaxion was not an automobile but rather the 'ground-taxying mode' of a vehicle that might one day be designed to fly, land and drive — an "Omni-Medium Transport" for air, land and water. Fuller focused on the landing and taxiing qualities, and noted severe limitations in its handling. The team made improvements and refinements to the platform, and Fuller noted the Dymaxion "was an invention that could not be made available to the general public without considerable improvements".

The bodywork was aerodynamically designed for increased fuel efficiency and its platform featured a lightweight cromoly-steel hinged chassis, rear-mounted V8 engine, front-drive, and three wheels. The vehicle was steered via the third wheel at the rear, capable of 90° steering lock. Able to steer in a tight circle, the Dymaxion often caused a sensation, bringing nearby traffic to a halt.

Shortly after launch, a prototype rolled over and crashed, killing the Dymaxion's driver and seriously injuring its passengers. Fuller blamed the accident on a second car that collided with the Dymaxion. Eyewitnesses reported, however, that the other car hit the Dymaxion only after it had begun to roll over.

Despite courting the interest of important figures from the auto industry, Fuller used his family inheritance to finish the second and third prototypes — eventually selling all three, dissolving Dymaxion Corporation and maintaining the Dymaxion was never intended as a commercial venture. One of the three original prototypes survives.

=== Housing ===
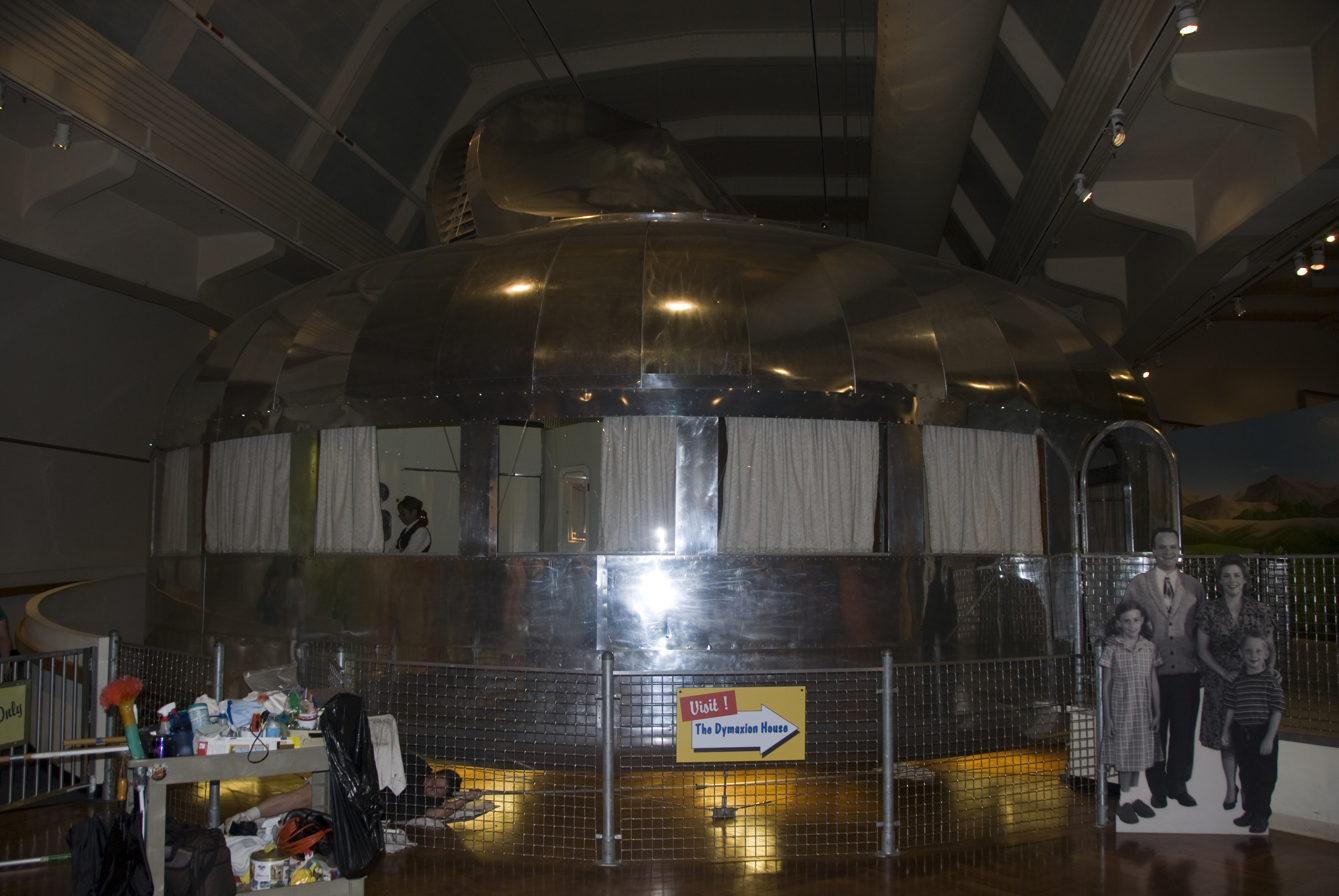
A Dymaxion house at The Henry Ford Museum in Dearborn, Michigan

Fuller's energy-efficient and inexpensive Dymaxion house garnered much interest, but only two prototypes were ever produced. Here the term "Dymaxion" is used in effect to signify a "radically strong and light tensegrity structure". One of Fuller's Dymaxion Houses is on display as a permanent exhibit at the Henry Ford Museum in Dearborn, Michigan. Designed and developed during the mid-1940s, this prototype is a round structure (not a dome), shaped something like the flattened "bell" of certain jellyfish. It has several innovative features, including revolving dresser drawers, and a fine-mist shower that reduces water consumption. According to Fuller biographer Steve Crooks, the house was designed to be delivered in two cylindrical packages, with interior color panels available at local dealers. A circular structure at the top of the house was designed to rotate around a central mast to use natural winds for cooling and air circulation.

Conceived nearly two decades earlier, and developed in Wichita, Kansas, the house was designed to be lightweight, adapted to windy climates, cheap to produce and easy to assemble. Because of its light weight and portability, the Dymaxion House was intended to be the ideal housing for individuals and families who wanted the option of easy mobility. The design included a "Go-Ahead-With-Life Room" stocked with maps, charts, and helpful tools for travel "through time and space". It was to be produced using factories, workers, and technologies that had produced World War II aircraft. It looked ultramodern at the time, built of metal, and sheathed in polished aluminum. The basic model enclosed 90 m^{2} (970 ft^{2}) of floor area. Due to publicity, there were many orders during the early Post-War years, but the company that Fuller and others had formed to produce the houses failed due to management problems.

In 1967, Fuller developed a concept for an offshore floating city named Triton City and published a report on the design the following year. Models of the city aroused the interest of President Lyndon B. Johnson who, after leaving office, had them placed in the Lyndon Baines Johnson Library and Museum.

In 1969, Fuller began the Otisco Project, named after its location in Otisco, New York. The project developed and demonstrated concrete spray with mesh-covered wireforms for producing large-scale, load-bearing spanning structures built on-site, without the use of pouring molds, other adjacent surfaces, or hoisting. The initial method used a circular concrete footing in which anchor posts were set. Tubes cut to length and with ends flattened were then bolted together to form a duodeca-rhombicahedron (22-sided hemisphere) geodesic structure with spans ranging to 60 feet (18 m). The form was then draped with layers of ¼-inch wire mesh attached by twist ties. Concrete was sprayed onto the structure, building up a solid layer which, when cured, would support additional concrete to be added by a variety of traditional means. Fuller referred to these buildings as monolithic ferroconcrete geodesic domes. However, the tubular frame form proved problematic for setting windows and doors. It was replaced by an iron rebar set vertically in the concrete footing and then bent inward and welded in place to create the dome's wireform structure and performed satisfactorily. Domes up to three stories tall built with this method proved to be remarkably strong. Other shapes such as cones, pyramids, and arches proved equally adaptable.

The project was enabled by a grant underwritten by Syracuse University and sponsored by U.S. Steel (rebar), the Johnson Wire Corp (mesh), and Portland Cement Company (concrete). The ability to build large complex load bearing concrete spanning structures in free space would open many possibilities in architecture, and is considered one of Fuller's greatest contributions.

=== Dymaxion map and World Game ===
Fuller, along with co-cartographer Shoji Sadao, also designed an alternative projection map, called the Dymaxion map. This was designed to show Earth's continents with minimum distortion when projected or printed on a flat surface.

In the 1960s, Fuller developed the World Game, a collaborative simulation game played on a 70-by-35-foot Dymaxion map, in which players attempt to solve world problems. The object of the simulation game is, in Fuller's words, to "make the world work, for 100% of humanity, in the shortest possible time, through spontaneous cooperation, without ecological offense or the disadvantage of anyone".

== Appearance and style ==
Buckminster Fuller wore thick-lensed spectacles to correct his extreme hyperopia, a condition that went undiagnosed for the first five years of his life. Fuller's hearing was damaged during his naval service in World War I and deteriorated during the 1960s. After experimenting with bullhorns as hearing aids during the mid-1960s, Fuller adopted electronic hearing aids from the 1970s onward.

In public appearances, Fuller always wore dark-colored suits, appearing like "an alert little clergyman". Previously, he had experimented with unconventional clothing immediately after his 1927 epiphany, but found that breaking social fashion customs made others devalue or dismiss his ideas. Fuller learned the importance of physical appearance as part of one's credibility, and decided to become "the invisible man" by dressing in clothes that would not draw attention to himself. With self-deprecating humor, Fuller described this black-suited appearance as resembling a "second-rate bank clerk".

Writer Guy Davenport met him in 1965 and described him thus:

He's a dwarf, with a worker's hands, all callouses and squared fingers. He carries an ear trumpet, of green plastic, with WORLD SERIES 1965 printed on it. His smile is golden and frequent; the man's temperament is angelic, and his energy is just a touch more than that of [Robert] Gallway (champion runner, footballer, and swimmer). One leg is shorter than the other, and the prescription shoe worn to correct the imbalance comes from a country doctor deep in the wilderness of Maine. Blue blazer, Khrushchev trousers, and a briefcase full of Japanese-made wonderments;

== Lifestyle ==
Following his global prominence from the 1960s onward, Fuller became a frequent flier, often crossing time zones to lecture. In the 1960s and 1970s, he wore three watches simultaneously; one for the time zone of his office at Southern Illinois University, one for the time zone of the location he would next visit, and one for the time zone he was currently in. In the 1970s, Fuller was only in 'homely' locations (his personal home in Carbondale, Illinois; his holiday retreat in Bear Island, Maine; and his daughter's home in Pacific Palisades, California) roughly 65 nights per year—the other 300 nights were spent in hotel beds in the locations he visited on his lecturing and consulting circuits.

In the 1920s, Fuller experimented with polyphasic sleep, which he called Dymaxion sleep. Inspired by the sleep habits of animals such as dogs and cats, Fuller worked until he was tired, and then slept short naps. This generally resulted in Fuller sleeping 30-minute naps every 6 hours. This allowed him "twenty-two thinking hours a day", which aided his work productivity. Fuller reportedly kept this Dymaxion sleep habit for two years, before quitting the routine because it conflicted with his business associates' sleep habits. Despite no longer personally partaking in the habit, in 1943 Fuller suggested Dymaxion sleep as a strategy that the United States could adopt to win World War II.

Despite only practicing true polyphasic sleep for a period during the 1920s, Fuller was known for his stamina throughout his life. He was described as "tireless" by Barry Farrell in Life magazine, who noted that Fuller stayed up all night replying to mail during Farrell's 1970 trip to Bear Island. In his seventies, Fuller generally slept for 5–8 hours per night.

Fuller documented his life copiously from 1915 to 1983, approximately 270 feet (82 m) of papers in a collection called the Dymaxion Chronofile. He also kept copies of all incoming and outgoing correspondence. The enormous R. Buckminster Fuller Collection is currently housed at Stanford University.

If somebody kept a very accurate record of a human being, going through the era from the Gay 90s, from a very different kind of world through the turn of the century—as far into the twentieth century as you might live. I decided to make myself a good case history of such a human being and it meant that I could not be judge of what was valid to put in or not. I must put everything in, so I started a very rigorous record.

== Language and neologisms ==
Buckminster Fuller spoke and wrote in a unique style and said it was important to describe the world as accurately as possible. Fuller often created long run-on sentences and used unusual compound words (omniwell-informed, intertransformative, omni-interaccommodative, omniself-regenerative), as well as terms he himself invented. His style of speech was characterized by progressively rapid and breathless delivery and rambling digressions of thought, which Fuller described as "thinking out loud". The effect, combined with Fuller's dry voice and non-rhotic New England accent, was varyingly considered "hypnotic" or "overwhelming".

Fuller used the word Universe without the definite or indefinite article (the or a) and always capitalized the word. Fuller wrote that "by Universe I mean: the aggregate of all humanity's consciously apprehended and communicated (to self or others) Experiences".

The words "down" and "up", according to Fuller, are awkward in that they refer to a planar concept of direction inconsistent with human experience. The words "in" and "out" should be used instead, he argued, because they better describe an object's relation to a gravitational center, the Earth. "I suggest to audiences that they say, 'I'm going "outstairs" and "instairs."' At first that sounds strange to them; They all laugh about it. But if they try saying in and out for a few days in fun, they find themselves beginning to realize that they are indeed going inward and outward in respect to the center of Earth, which is our Spaceship Earth. And for the first time they begin to feel real 'reality.'"

Fuller preferred the term "world-around" to replace "worldwide". The general belief in a flat Earth died out in classical antiquity, so using "wide" is an anachronism when referring to the surface of the Earth—a spheroidal surface has area and encloses a volume but has no width. Fuller held that unthinking use of obsolete scientific ideas detracts from and misleads intuition. Other neologisms collectively invented by the Fuller family, according to Allegra Fuller Snyder, are the terms "sunsight" and "sunclipse", replacing "sunrise" and "sunset" to overturn the geocentric bias of most pre-Copernican celestial mechanics.

Fuller also invented the word "livingry", as opposed to weaponry (or "killingry"), to mean that which is in support of all human, plant, and Earth life. "The architectural profession—civil, naval, aeronautical, and astronautical—has always been the place where the most competent thinking is conducted regarding livingry, as opposed to weaponry."

As well as contributing significantly to the development of tensegrity technology, Fuller invented the term "tensegrity", a portmanteau of "tensional integrity". "Tensegrity describes a structural-relationship principle in which structural shape is guaranteed by the finitely closed, comprehensively continuous, tensional behaviors of the system and not by the discontinuous and exclusively local compressional member behaviors. Tensegrity provides the ability to yield increasingly without ultimately breaking or coming asunder."

"Dymaxion" is a portmanteau of "dynamic maximum tension". It was invented around 1929 by two admen at Marshall Field's department store in Chicago to describe Fuller's concept house, which was shown as part of a house of the future store display. They created the term using three words that Fuller used repeatedly to describe his design – dynamic, maximum, and tension.

Fuller also helped to popularize the concept of Spaceship Earth: "The most important fact about Spaceship Earth: an instruction manual didn't come with it."

In the preface for his "cosmic fairy tale" Tetrascroll: Goldilocks and the Three Bears, Fuller stated that his distinctive speaking style grew out of years of embellishing the classic tale for the benefit of his daughter, allowing him to explore both his new theories and how to present them. The Tetrascroll narrative was eventually transcribed onto a set of tetrahedral lithographs (hence the name), as well as being published as a traditional book.

Fuller's language posed problems for his credibility. John Julius Norwich recalled commissioning a 600-word introduction for a planned history of world architecture from him, and receiving a 3500-word proposal which ended:

We will see the (1) down-at-the-mouth-ends curvature of land civilisation's retrogression from the (2) straight raft line foundation of the Mayans' building foundation lines historically transformed to the (3) smiling, up-end curvature of maritime technology transformed through the climbing angle of wingfoil aeronautics progressing humanity into the verticality of outward-bound rocketry and inward-bound microcosmy, ergo (4) the ultimately invisible and vertically-lined architecture as humans master local environment with invisible electro-magnetic fields while travelling by radio as immortal pattern-integrities.

Norwich commented: "On reflection, I asked Dr. Nikolaus Pevsner instead."

== Concepts and buildings ==
His concepts and buildings include:

- Dymaxion house (1928)
- R. Buckminster Fuller and Anne Hewlett Dome Home
- Aerodynamic Dymaxion car (1933)
- Prefabricated compact bathroom cell (1937)
- Dymaxion deployment unit (1940)
- Dymaxion map of the world (1946)
- Tensegrity structures (1949)
- Geodesic dome for Ford Motor Company (1953)
- Patent on geodesic domes (1954)
- Tokyo Tower (1958) (unselected design)
- Tokyo Olympic Stadium (1958) (unselected design)
- The World Game (1961) and the World Game Institute (1972)
- Patent on octet truss (1961)
- Montreal Biosphere (1967), United States pavilion at Expo 67
- Fly's Eye Dome
- Dewan Tunku Geodesic Dome, KOMTAR, Penang, Malaysia (proposed 1974, completed 1985)
- Comprehensive anticipatory design science

== Influence and legacy ==
Buckminsterfullerene is a type of fullerene with the formula C_{60}. The names are homages to Buckminster Fuller, whose geodesic domes they resemble.

Among the many people who were influenced by Buckminster Fuller are: Constance Abernathy, Ruth Asawa, J. Baldwin, Michael Ben-Eli, Pierre Cabrol, John Cage, Joseph Clinton, Peter Floyd, Norman Foster, Medard Gabel, Michael Hays, Ted Nelson, David Johnston, Peter Jon Pearce, Shoji Sadao, Edwin Schlossberg, Kenneth Snelson, Robert Anton Wilson, Stewart Brand, Jason McLennan, and John Denver.

An allotrope of carbon, fullerene—and a particular molecule of that allotrope C_{60} (buckminsterfullerene or buckyball) has been named after him. The Buckminsterfullerene molecule, which consists of 60 carbon atoms, very closely resembles a spherical version of Fuller's geodesic dome. The 1996 Nobel Prize in Chemistry was given to Kroto, Curl, and Smalley for their discovery of the fullerene.

On July 12, 2004, the United States Post Office released a new commemorative stamp honoring R. Buckminster Fuller on the 50th anniversary of his patent for the geodesic dome and by the occasion of his 109th birthday. The stamp's design replicated the January 10, 1964, cover of Time magazine.

Fuller was the subject of two documentary films: The World of Buckminster Fuller (1971) and Buckminster Fuller: Thinking Out Loud (1996). Additionally, filmmaker Sam Green and the band Yo La Tengo collaborated on a 2012 "live documentary" about Fuller, The Love Song of R. Buckminster Fuller.

In June 2008, the Whitney Museum of American Art presented "Buckminster Fuller: Starting with the Universe", the most comprehensive retrospective to date of his work and ideas. The exhibition traveled to the Museum of Contemporary Art, Chicago in 2009. It presented a combination of models, sketches, and other artifacts, representing six decades of the artist's integrated approach to housing, transportation, communication, and cartography. It also featured the extensive connections with Chicago from his years spent living, teaching, and working in the city.

In 2009, a number of US companies decided to repackage spherical magnets and sell them as toys. One company, Maxfield & Oberton, told The New York Times that they saw the product on YouTube and decided to repackage them as "Buckyballs", because the magnets could self-form and hold together in shapes reminiscent of the Fuller inspired buckyballs. The buckyball toy launched at New York International Gift Fair in 2009 and sold in the hundreds of thousands, but by 2010 began to experience problems with toy safety issues and the company was forced to recall the packages that were labelled as toys.

In 2012, the San Francisco Museum of Modern Art hosted "The Utopian Impulse" – a show about Buckminster Fuller's influence in the Bay Area. Featured were concepts, inventions and designs for creating "free energy" from natural forces, and for sequestering carbon from the atmosphere. The show ran January through July.

In 2025 historian Eva Díaz published the book After Spaceship Earth: Art, Techno-utopia, and Other Science Fictions (Yale University Press) about the legacy of Buckminster Fuller's work in contemporary culture. The book considers works of art and design using geodesic domes in various ways: as ad-hoc architectural projects dealing with climate change, as spaces of exhibition display and communication design, as proposals to solve housing crises, and as critiques of corporate and governmental surveillance. The book also takes up the influence of Fuller and Stewart Brand in artworks exploring outer space exploration and colonization.

== In popular culture ==
Fuller is quoted in "The Tower of Babble" from the musical Godspell: "Man is a complex of patterns and processes."

Belgian rock band dEUS released the song The Architect, inspired by Fuller, on their 2008 album Vantage Point.

Indie band Driftless Pony Club titled their 2011 album Buckminster after Fuller. Each of the album's songs is based upon his life and works.

The design podcast 99% Invisible (2010–present) takes its title from a Fuller quote: "Ninety-nine percent of who you are is invisible and untouchable."

Fuller is briefly mentioned in X-Men: Days of Future Past (2014) when Kitty Pryde is giving a lecture to a group of students regarding utopian architecture.

Robert Kiyosaki's 2009 book Conspiracy of the Rich and 2015 book Second Chance both concern Kiyosaki's interactions with Fuller as well as Fuller's unusual final book, Grunch of Giants.

In The House of Tomorrow (2017), based on Peter Bognanni's 2010 novel of the same name, Ellen Burstyn's character is obsessed with Fuller and provides retro-futurist tours of her geodesic home that include videos of Fuller sailing and talking with Burstyn, who had in real life befriended Fuller.

In The Simpsons' Treehouse of Horror episode airing on October 29, 1992, a scan over Springfield graveyard reveals graves for American workmanship, Drexell's Class, slapstick, and Buckminster Fuller.

Fuller appears in the book series The Grim Noir Chronicles authored by Larry Correia as a character who helps the main cast via his abilities as a Cog

== Patents ==
(from the Table of Contents of Inventions: The Patented Works of R. Buckminster Fuller (1983) ISBN 0-312-43477-4)

- 1927 U.S. patent 1,633,702 Stockade: building structure
- 1927 U.S. patent 1,634,900 Stockade: pneumatic forming process
- 1928 (Application Abandoned) 4D house
- 1937 U.S. patent 2,101,057 Dymaxion car
- 1940 U.S. patent 2,220,482 Dymaxion bathroom
- 1944 U.S. patent 2,343,764 Dymaxion deployment unit (sheet)
- 1944 U.S. patent 2,351,419 Dymaxion deployment unit (frame)
- 1946 U.S. patent 2,393,676 Dymaxion map
- 1946 (No Patent) Dymaxion house (Wichita)
- 1954 U.S. patent 2,682,235 Geodesic dome
- 1959 U.S. patent 2,881,717 Paperboard dome
- 1959 U.S. patent 2,905,113 Plydome
- 1959 U.S. patent 2,914,074 Catenary (geodesic tent)
- 1961 U.S. patent 2,986,241 Octet truss
- 1962 U.S. patent 3,063,521 Tensegrity
- 1963 U.S. patent 3,080,583 Submarisle (undersea island)
- 1964 U.S. patent 3,139,957 Aspension (suspension building)
- 1965 U.S. patent 3,197,927 Monohex (geodesic structures)
- 1965 U.S. patent 3,203,144 Laminar dome
- 1965 (Filed – No Patent) Octa spinner
- 1967 U.S. patent 3,354,591 Star tensegrity (octahedral truss)
- 1970 U.S. patent 3,524,422 Rowing needles (watercraft)
- 1974 U.S. patent 3,810,336 Geodesic hexa-pent
- 1975 U.S. patent 3,863,455 Floatable breakwater
- 1975 U.S. patent 3,866,366 Non-symmetrical tensegrity
- 1979 U.S. patent 4,136,994 Floating breakwater
- 1980 U.S. patent 4,207,715 Tensegrity truss
- 1983 U.S. patent 4,377,114 Hanging storage shelf unit

== Bibliography ==
- 4d Timelock (1928)
- Nine Chains to the Moon (1938)
- Untitled Epic Poem on the History of Industrialization (1962)
- Ideas and Integrities, a Spontaneous Autobiographical Disclosure (1963), ISBN 0-13-449140-8
- No More Secondhand God and Other Writings (1963)
- Education Automation: Freeing the Scholar to Return (1963)
- What I Have Learned: A Collection of 20 Autobiographical Essays, Chapter "How Little I Know" (1968)
- Operating Manual for Spaceship Earth (1968), ISBN 0-8093-2461-X
- Utopia or Oblivion (1969), ISBN 0-553-02883-9
- Approaching the Benign Environment (1970), ISBN 0-8173-6641-5 (with Eric A. Walker and James R. Killian Jr.)
- I Seem to Be a Verb (1970), coauthors Jerome Agel, Quentin Fiore, ISBN 1-127-23153-7
- Intuition (1970)
- Buckminster Fuller to Children of Earth (1972), compiled and photographed by Cam Smith, ISBN 0-385-02979-9
- The Buckminster Fuller Reader (1972), editor James Meller, ISBN 978-0140214345
- The Dymaxion World of Buckminster Fuller (1960, 1973), coauthor Robert Marks, ISBN 0-385-01804-5
- Earth, Inc (1973), ISBN 0-385-01825-8
- Synergetics: Explorations in the Geometry of Thinking (1975), in collaboration with E. J. Applewhite with a preface and contribution by Arthur L. Loeb, ISBN 0-02-541870-X
- Tetrascroll: Goldilocks and the Three Bears, A Cosmic Fairy Tale (1975)
- And It Came to Pass — Not to Stay (1976), ISBN 0-02-541810-6
- R. Buckminster Fuller on Education (1979), ISBN 0-87023-276-2
- Synergetics 2: Further Explorations in the Geometry of Thinking (1979), in collaboration with E. J. Applewhite
- Buckminster Fuller – Autobiographical Monologue/Scenario (1980), p. 54, R. Buckminster Fuller, documented and edited by Robert Snyder, St. Martin's Press, Inc., ISBN 0-312-10678-5
- Buckminster Fuller Sketchbook (1981)
- Critical Path (1981), ISBN 0-312-17488-8
- Grunch of Giants (1983), ISBN 0-312-35193-3
- Inventions: The Patented Works of R. Buckminster Fuller (1983), ISBN 0-312-43477-4
- Humans in Universe (1983), coauthor Anwar Dil, ISBN 0-89925-001-7
- Cosmography: A Posthumous Scenario for the Future of Humanity (1992), coauthor Kiyoshi Kuromiya, ISBN 0-02-541850-5

== Discography ==
- R. Buckminster Fuller Thinks Aloud (Part 1) (1966), Credo - credo 2
- Thinks Aloud (1967), Society Of Typographic Arts – 919S-7200
- R. Buckminster Fuller Speaks His Mind On Records (1967), Cook – COOK05025
- The Clock Is Stopping! (1976), Cook – 6061
- Dymaxion Ditties - The Greatest Hits Of Buckminster Fuller (1976), Not on Label - Cherry Tree Folk Club - Philadelphia, PA
- Tunings (1979), Tanam Press – 7902
- A Primer Conversation (1988), New Dimensions Productions – C010

== See also ==
- Amundsen-Scott South Pole Station
- The Buckminster Fuller Challenge
- Bucky Ball
- Cloud Nine (tensegrity sphere)
- Design science revolution
- Drop City
- Emissions Reduction Currency System
- Kārlis Johansons, tensegrity innovator
- Kenneth Snelson, tensegrity sculptor
- Noosphere
- Old Man River's City project
- Post-scarcity economy
- Space frame
- Spome
- Whole Earth Catalog
