= Geodesic dome =

Spherical shell structure based on a geodesic polyhedron

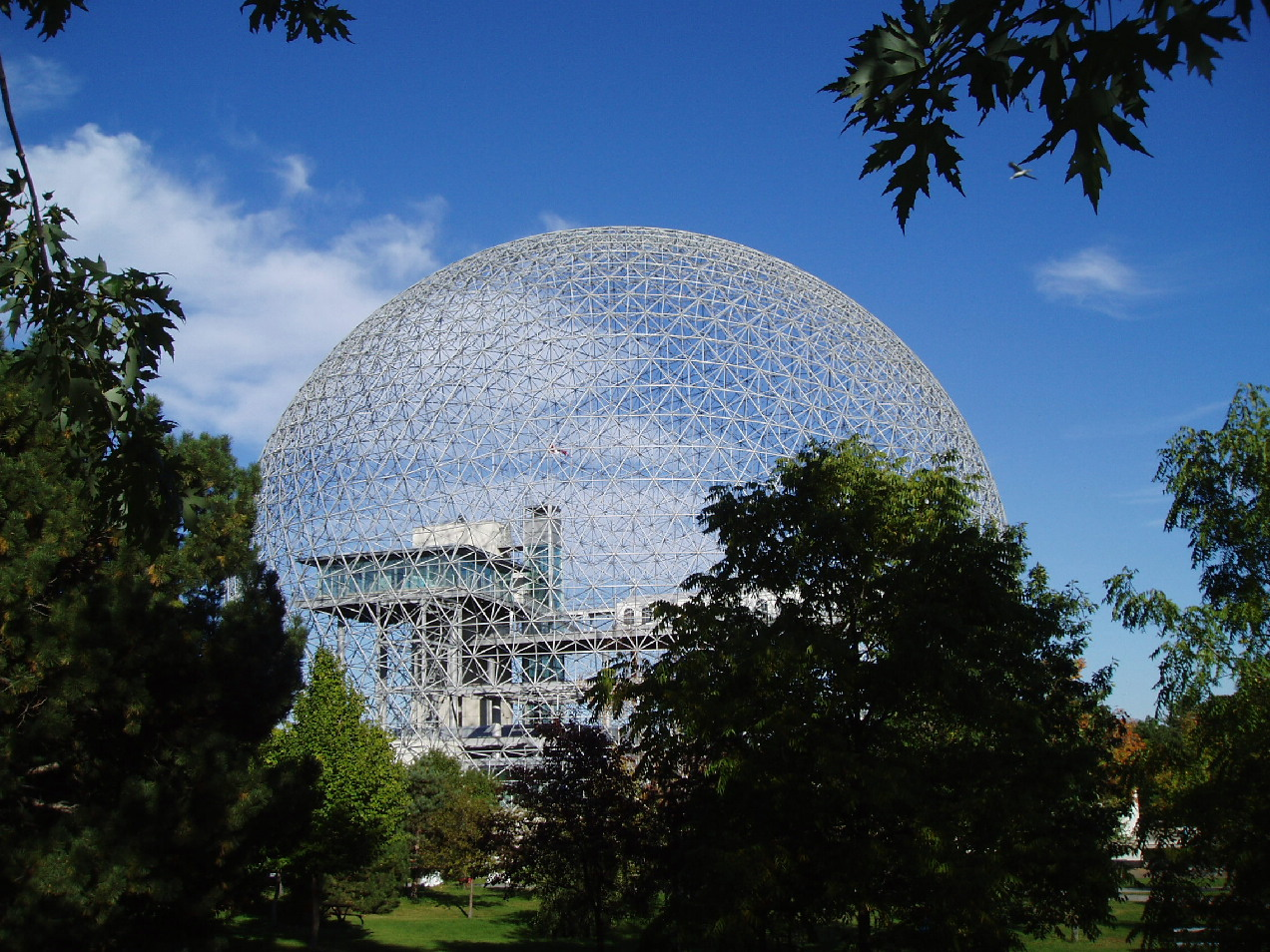
The Montreal Biosphere, formerly the American Pavilion of Expo 67, by R. Buckminster Fuller, on Saint Helen's Island, Montreal, Quebec

A geodesic dome is a hemispherical thin-shell structure (lattice-shell) based on a geodesic polyhedron. The rigid triangular elements of the dome distribute stress throughout the structure, making geodesic domes able to withstand very heavy loads for their size.

== History ==
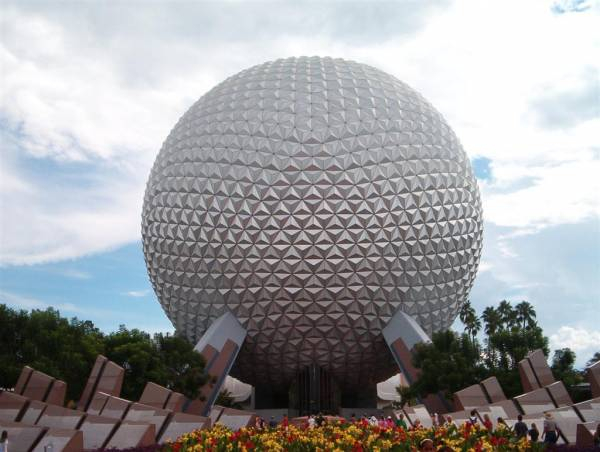
Spaceship Earth at Epcot

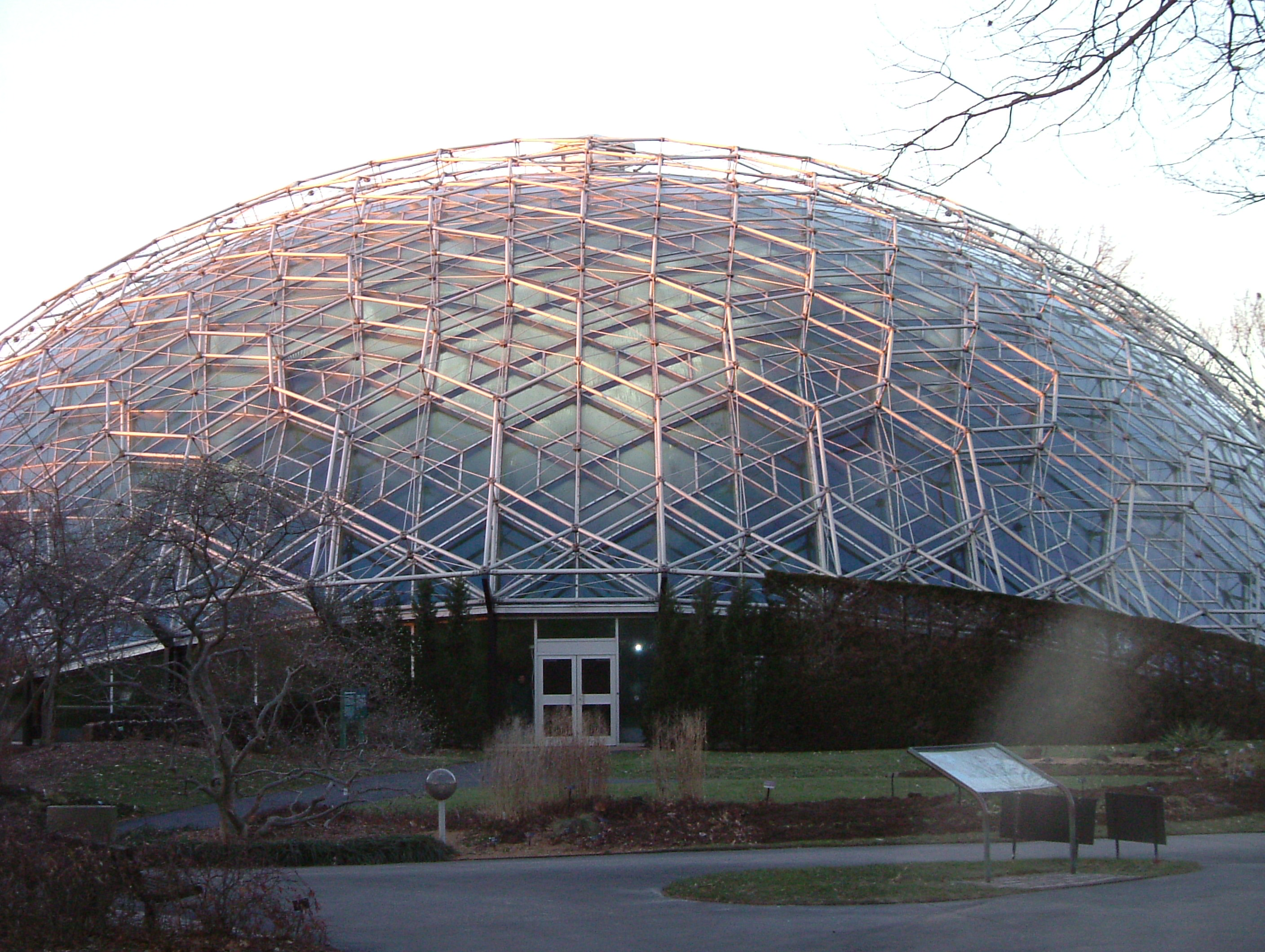
The Climatron greenhouse at Missouri Botanical Garden, built in 1960 and designed by Thomas C. Howard of Synergetics, Inc., inspired the domes in the science fiction movie Silent Running.

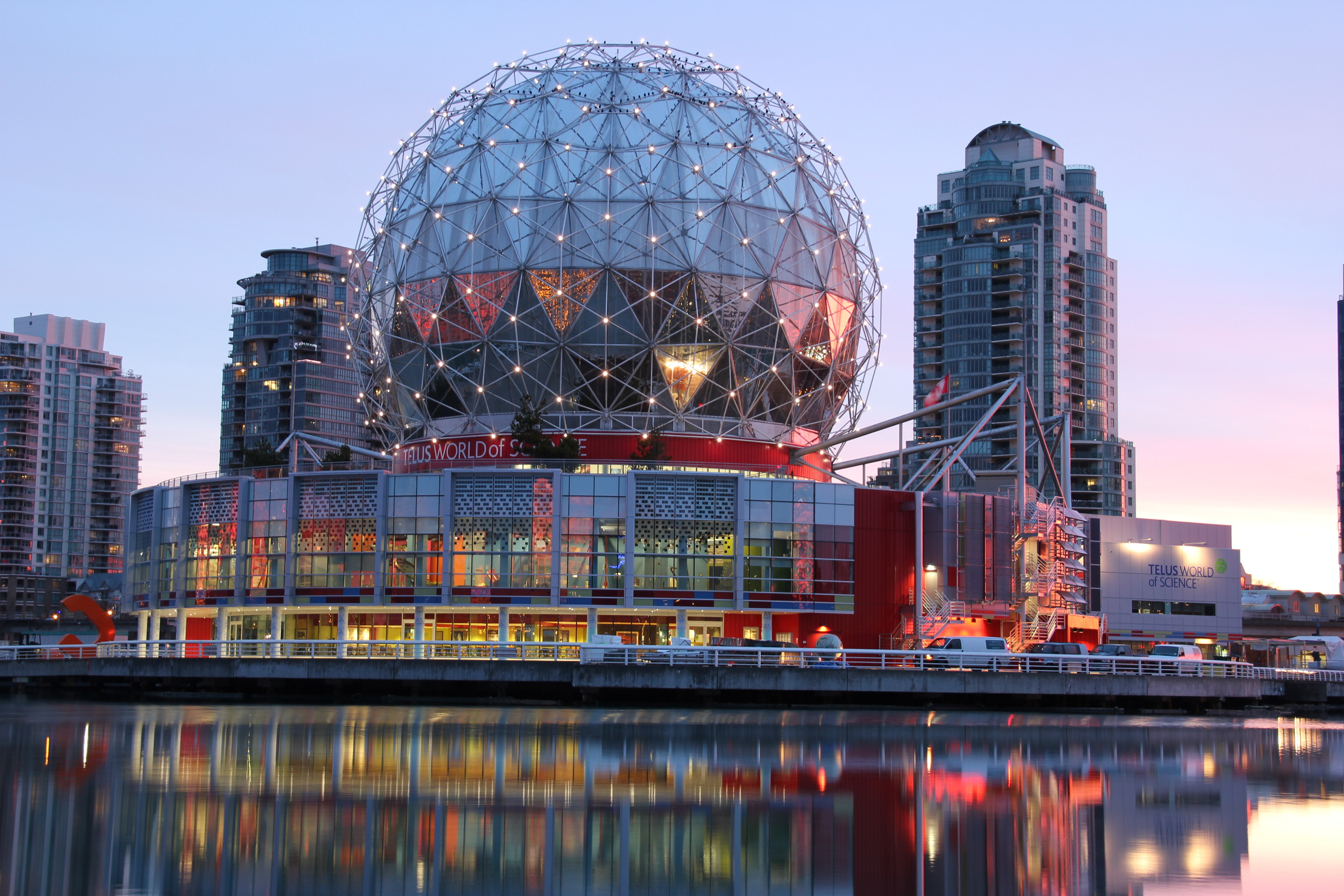
Science World in Vancouver, built for Expo 86, and inspired by Buckminster Fuller's Geodesic dome.

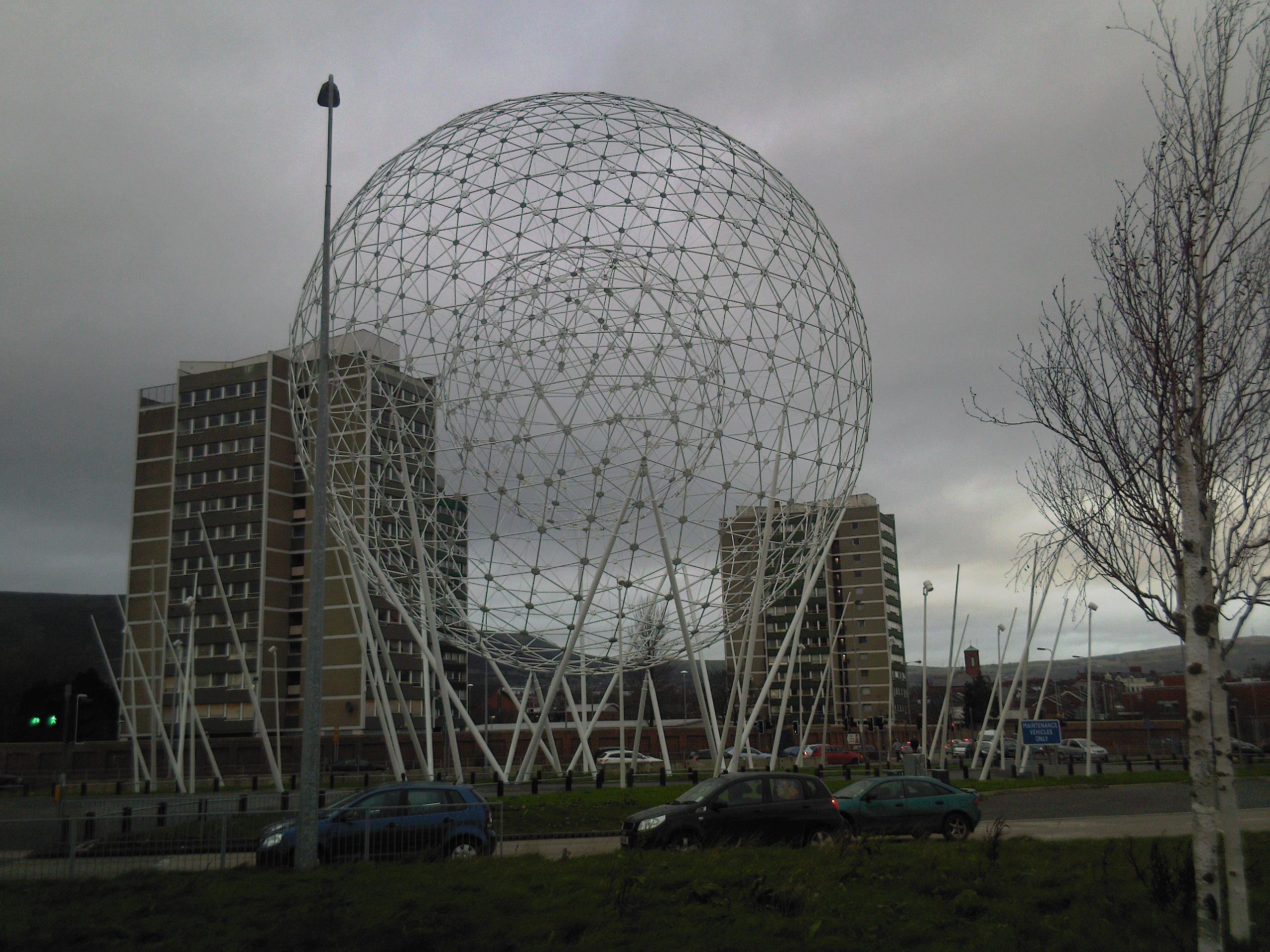
RISE, public art designed by Wolfgang Buttress, located in Belfast, consists of two spheres which utilise Buckminster Fuller's Geodesic dome.

The first geodesic dome was designed after World War I by Walther Bauersfeld, chief engineer of Carl Zeiss Jena, an optical company, for a planetarium to house his planetarium projector. An initial, small dome was patented and constructed by the firm of Dykerhoff and Wydmann on the roof of the Carl Zeiss Werke in Jena, Germany. A larger dome, called "The Wonder of Jena", opened to the public on July 18, 1926.

Twenty years later, Buckminster Fuller coined the term "geodesic" from field experiments with artist Kenneth Snelson at Black Mountain College in 1948 and 1949. Although Fuller was not the original inventor, he is credited with the U.S. popularization of the idea for which he received U.S. patent 2682235A on 29 June 1954. The oldest surviving dome built by Fuller himself is located in Woods Hole, Massachusetts, and was built by students under his tutelage over three weeks in 1953.

The geodesic dome appealed to Fuller because it was extremely strong for its weight, its "omnitriangulated" surface provided an inherently stable structure, and because a sphere encloses the greatest volume for the least surface area.

The dome was successfully adopted for specialized uses, such as the 21 Distant Early Warning Line domes built in Canada in 1956, the 1958 Union Tank Car Company dome near Baton Rouge, Louisiana, designed by Thomas C. Howard of Synergetics, Inc. and specialty buildings such as the Kaiser Aluminum domes (constructed in numerous locations across the US, e.g., Virginia Beach, Virginia), auditoriums, weather observatories, and storage facilities. The dome was soon breaking records for covered surface, enclosed volume, and construction speed.

Beginning in 1954, the U.S. Marines experimented with helicopter-deliverable geodesic domes. A 9.1-metre (30 ft) wood and plastic geodesic dome was lifted and carried by helicopter at 93 kilometres per hour (50 kn) without damage, leading to the manufacture of a standard magnesium dome by Magnesium Products of Milwaukee. Tests included assembly practices in which previously untrained Marines were able to assemble a 9.1-metre (30 ft) magnesium dome in 135 minutes, helicopter lifts off aircraft carriers, and a durability test in which an anchored dome successfully withstood without damage, a day-long 120 mph (190 km/h) propeller blast from the twin 3,000 horsepower engines of an anchored airplane.

The 1958 Gold Dome in Oklahoma City, Oklahoma, used Fuller's design for a bank building. Another early example was the Stepan Center at the University of Notre Dame, built in 1962.

The dome was introduced to a wider audience at a pavilion for the 1964 New York World's Fair designed by Thomas C. Howard of Synergetics, Inc. This dome is now used as an aviary by the Queens Zoo in Flushing Meadows Corona Park.

Another dome is from Expo 67 at the Montreal World's Fair, where it was part of the American Pavilion. The structure's covering later burned, but the structure itself still stands and, under the name Biosphère, currently houses an interpretive museum about the Saint Lawrence River.

In the 1970s, Zomeworks licensed plans for structures based on other geometric solids, such as the Johnson solids, Archimedean solids, and Catalan solids. These structures may have some faces that are not triangular, being squares or other polygons.

In 1975, a dome was constructed at the South Pole, where its resistance to snow and wind loads was important.

On October 1, 1982, one of the most famous geodesic domes, Spaceship Earth at Epcot in Walt Disney World Resort in Bay Lake, Florida, just outside of Orlando opened. The building and the ride inside of it are named with one of Buckminster Fuller's famous terms, Spaceship Earth, a world view expressing concern over the use of limited resources available on Earth and encouraging everyone on it to act as a harmonious crew working toward the greater good. The building is Epcot's icon, representing the entire park.

For the 1986 World's Fair (Expo 86), held in Vancouver, a Buckminster Fuller-inspired Geodesic dome was designed by the Expo's chief architect Bruno Freschi to serve as the fair's Expo Centre. Construction began in 1984 and was completed by early 1985. The dome and the building now serve as an Arts, Science and Technology center, and has been named Science World.

In 2000, the world's first fully sustainable geodesic dome hotel, EcoCamp Patagonia, was built at Kawésqar National Park in Chilean Patagonia, opening the following year in 2001. The hotel's dome design is key to resisting the region's strong winds and is based on the dwellings of the indigenous Kaweskar people. Geodomes are also becoming popular as a glamping (glamorous camping) unit.

== Methods of construction ==
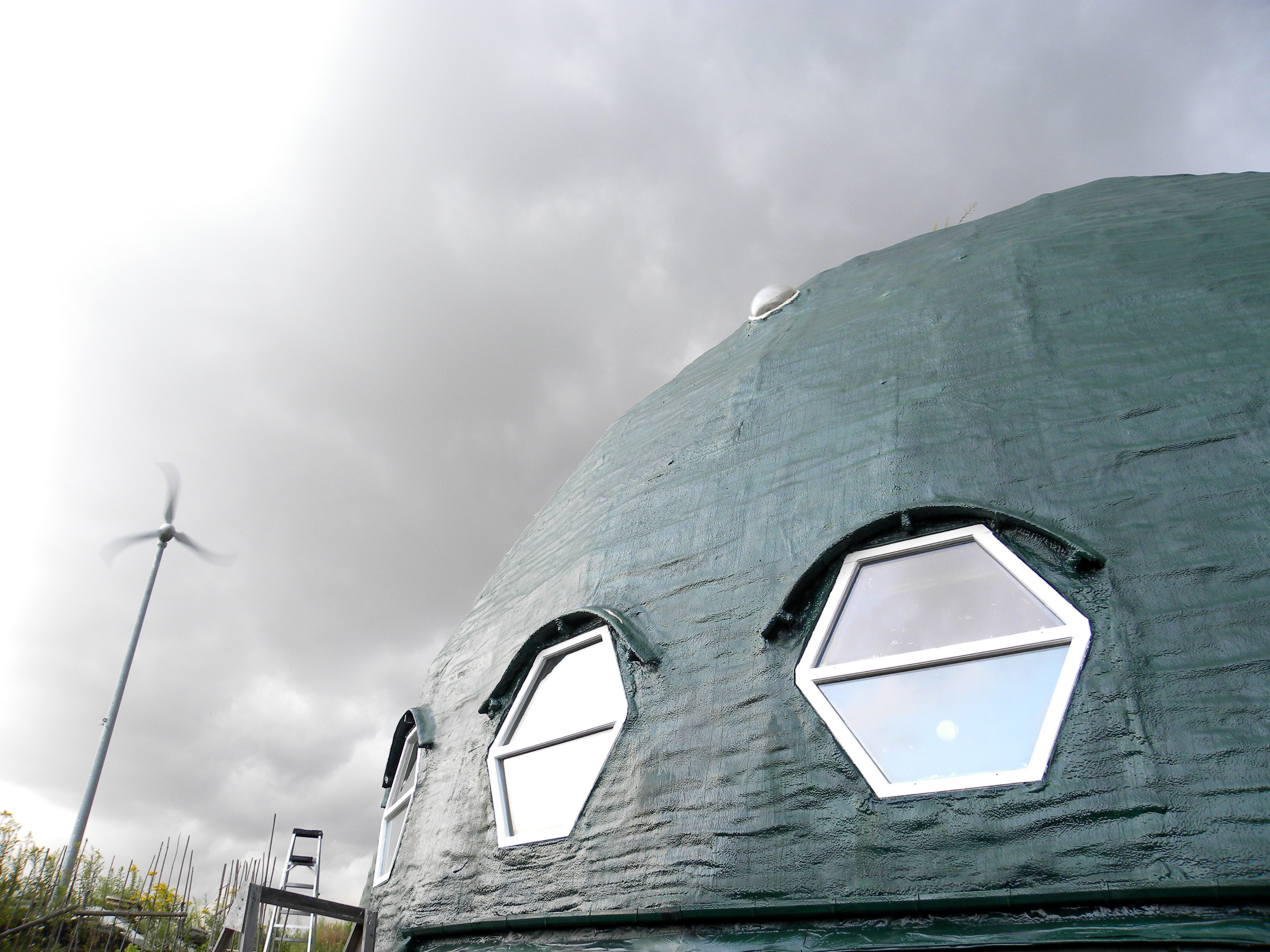
Long Island Green Dome

Wooden domes have a hole drilled in the width of a strut. A stainless steel band locks the strut's hole to a steel pipe. With this method, the struts may be cut to the exact length needed. Triangles of exterior plywood are then nailed to the struts. The dome is wrapped from the bottom to the top with several stapled layers of tar paper, to shed water, and finished with shingles. This type of dome is often called a hub-and-strut dome because of the use of steel hubs to tie the struts together.

Paneled domes are constructed of separately framed timbers covered in plywood. The three members comprising the triangular frame are often cut at compound angles to provide for a flat fitting of the various triangles. Holes are drilled through the members at precise locations and steel bolts then connect the triangles to form the dome. These members are often 2x4s or 2x6s, which allow for more insulation to fit within the triangle. The panelized technique allows the builder to attach the plywood skin to the triangles while safely working on the ground or in a comfortable shop out of the weather. This method does not require expensive steel hubs.

Steel framework can be easily constructed of electrical conduit. One flattens the end of a strut and drills bolt holes at the needed length. A single bolt secures a vertex of struts. The nuts are usually set with removable locking compound, or if the dome is portable, have a castellated nut with a cotter pin. This is the standard way to construct domes for jungle gyms.

Domes can also be constructed with a lightweight aluminium framework which can either be bolted or welded together or can be connected with a more flexible nodal point/hub connection. These domes are usually clad with glass which is held in place with a PVC coping, which can be sealed with silicone to make it watertight. Some designs allow for double glazing or for insulated panels to be fixed in the framework.

Concrete and foam-plastic domes generally start with a steel framework dome, wrapped with chicken wire and wire screen for reinforcement. The chicken wire and screen are tied to the framework with wire ties. A coat of material is then sprayed or molded onto the frame. Tests should be performed with small squares to achieve the correct consistency of concrete or plastic. Generally, several coats are necessary on the inside and outside. The last step is to saturate concrete or polyester domes with a thin layer of epoxy compound to shed water.

Some concrete domes have been constructed from prefabricated, prestressed, steel-reinforced concrete panels that can be bolted into place. The bolts are within raised receptacles covered with little concrete caps to shed water. The triangles overlap to shed water. The triangles in this method can be molded in forms patterned in sand with wooden patterns, but the concrete triangles are usually so heavy that they must be placed with a crane. This construction is well-suited to domes because no place allows water to pool on the concrete and leak through. The metal fasteners, joints, and internal steel frames remain dry, preventing frost and corrosion damage. The concrete resists sun and weathering. Some form of internal flashing or caulking must be placed over the joints to prevent drafts. The 1963 Cinerama Dome was built from precast concrete hexagons and pentagons.

Domes can now be printed at high speeds using very large, mobile "3D Printers", also known as additive manufacturing machines. The material used as the filament is often a form of air injected concrete or closed-cell plastic foam.

Given the complicated geometry of the geodesic dome, dome builders rely on tables of strut lengths, or "chord factors". In Geodesic Math and How to Use It, Hugh Kenner wrote, "Tables of chord factors, containing as they do the essential design information for spherical systems, were for many years guarded like military secrets. As late as 1966, some 3ν icosa figures from Popular Science Monthly were all anyone outside the circle of Fuller licensees had to go on." (page 57, 1976 edition). Other tables became available with publication of Lloyd Kahn's Domebook 1 (1970) and Domebook 2 (1971).

== Dome homes ==
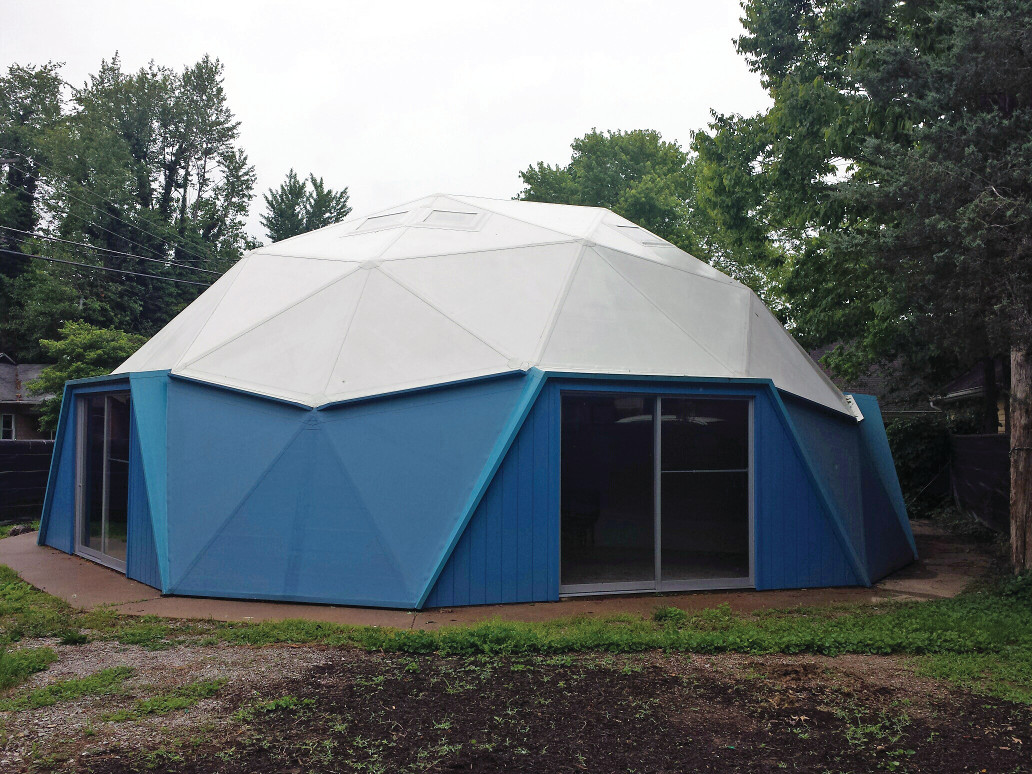
Buckminster Fuller's own home, following a 2014 restoration.

Fuller hoped that the geodesic dome would help address the postwar housing crisis. This was consistent with his prior hopes for both versions of the Dymaxion House.

Residential geodesic domes have been less successful than those used for working and/or entertainment, largely because of their complexity and consequent greater construction costs. Professional experienced dome contractors, while hard to find, do exist, and can eliminate much of the cost overruns associated with false starts and incorrect estimates. Fuller himself lived in a geodesic dome in Carbondale, Illinois, at the corner of Forest Ave and Cherry St. Fuller thought of residential domes as air-deliverable products manufactured by an aerospace-like industry. Fuller's own dome home still exists, the R. Buckminster Fuller and Anne Hewlett Dome Home, and a group called RBF Dome NFP is attempting to restore the dome and have it registered as a National Historic Landmark. It is on the National Register of Historic Places.

In 1986, a patent for a dome construction technique involving polystyrene triangles laminated to reinforced concrete on the outside, and wallboard on the inside was awarded to American Ingenuity of Rockledge, Florida. The construction technique allows the domes to be prefabricated in kit form and erected by a homeowner. This method makes the seams into the strongest part of the structure, where the seams and especially the hubs in most wooden-framed domes are the weakest point in the structure. It also has the advantage of being watertight.

Other examples have been built in Europe. In 2012, an aluminium and glass dome was used as a dome cover to an eco home in Norway and in 2013 a glass and wood clad dome home was built in Austria.

=== Disadvantages ===
Although dome homes enjoyed a ripple of popularity in the late 1960s and early 1970s, as a housing system, the dome has many disadvantages and problems. A former proponent of dome homes, Lloyd Kahn, who wrote two books about them (Domebook 1 and Domebook 2) and founded Shelter Publications, became disillusioned with them, calling them "smart but not wise". He noted the following disadvantages, which he has listed on his company's website: Off-the-shelf building materials (e.g., plywood, strand board) normally come in rectangular shapes, therefore some material may have to be scrapped after cutting rectangles down to triangles, increasing the cost of construction. Fire escapes are problematic; codes require them for larger structures, and they are expensive. Windows conforming to code can cost anywhere from five to fifteen times as much as windows in conventional houses. Professional electrical wiring costs more because of increased labor time. Even owner-wired situations are costly, because more of certain materials are required for dome construction. Expansion and partitioning is also difficult. Kahn notes that domes are difficult if not impossible to build with natural materials, generally requiring plastics, etc., which are polluting and deteriorate in sunlight.

Air stratification and moisture distribution within a dome are unusual. The conditions tend to quickly degrade wooden framing or interior paneling.

Privacy is difficult to guarantee because a dome is difficult to partition satisfactorily. Sounds, smells, and even reflected light tend to be conveyed through the entire structure.

As with any curved shape, the dome produces wall areas that can be difficult to use and leaves some peripheral floor area with restricted use due to lack of headroom. Circular plan shapes lack the simple modularity provided by rectangles. Furnishers and fitters design with flat surfaces in mind. Placing a standard sofa against an exterior wall (for example) results in a crescent behind the sofa being wasted.

Dome builders using cut-board sheathing material (common in the 1960s and 1970s) find it hard to seal domes against rain, because of their many seams. Also, these seams may be stressed because ordinary solar heat flexes the entire structure each day as the sun moves across the sky. Subsequent addition of straps and interior flexible drywall finishes has virtually eliminated this movement being noticed in the interior finishes.

The most effective waterproofing method with a wooden dome is to shingle the dome. Peaked caps at the top of the dome, or to modify the dome shapes are used where slope is insufficient for ice barrier. One-piece reinforced concrete or plastic domes are also in use, and some domes have been constructed from plastic or waxed cardboard triangles that are overlapped in such a way as to shed water.

Buckminster Fuller's former student J. Baldwin insisted that no reason exists for a properly designed, well-constructed dome to leak, and that some designs 'cannot' leak.

== Related patterns ==
The building of very strong, stable structures out of patterns of reinforcing triangles is most commonly seen in tent design. It has been applied in the abstract in other industrial design, but even in management science and deliberative structures as a conceptual metaphor, especially in the work of Stafford Beer, whose "transmigration" method is based so specifically on dome design that only fixed numbers of people can take part in the process at each deliberation stage.

== Largest geodesic dome structures ==
According to Guinness World Records, as of May 30, 2021, the Jeddah Super Dome, Jeddah, Saudi Arabia (21.7496403°N 39.1516230°E), 210 m (690 ft) is the current largest geodesic dome.

According to the Buckminster Fuller Institute in 2010, the world's 10 largest geodesic domes by diameter at that time were:

- Seagaia Ocean Dome (シーガイアオーシャンドーム): Miyazaki, Japan (31.9551°N 131.4691°E), 216.5 m (710 ft) — Demolished in 2017.
- Nagoya Dome (ナゴヤドーム): Nagoya, Japan (35.1859°N 136.9474°E), 187.2 m (614 ft)
- Superior Dome: Northern Michigan University. Marquette, Michigan, U.S. (46.5603°N 87.3938°W), 163.4 m (536 ft)
- Tacoma Dome: Tacoma, Washington, U.S. (47.2367°N 122.4270°W), 161.5 m (530 ft)
- Walkup Skydome: Northern Arizona University. Flagstaff, Arizona, U.S. (35.1805°N 111.6529°W), 153 m (502 ft)
- Round Valley Ensphere: Springerville-Eagar, AZ, U.S. (34.1204°N 109.2849°W), 134 m (440 ft)
- Former Spruce Goose Hangar: Long Beach, California, U.S. (33.7513°N 118.1889°W), 126 m (413 ft) — later owned by Carnival Cruise Line, and Google.
- Formosa Plastics Storage Facility: Mailiao, Taiwan (23.8007°N 120.1947°E), 122 m (400 ft) — Eleven domes.
- Union Tank Car Maintenance Facility: Baton Rouge, Louisiana, U.S. (30.5827°N 91.2344°W), 117 m (384 ft) — Demolished in 2007.
- Lehigh Portland Cement Storage Facility: Union Bridge, Maryland, U.S. (39.5590°N 77.1718°W), 114 m (374 ft)

The Fuller Institute list is now dated. Several important domes missed or built later are now in the top 10. Currently, many geodesic domes are larger than 113 metres (371 ft) in diameter.

- Poliedro de Caracas ("Caracas Polyhedron Arena"), Caracas, Venezuela (10.4338°N 66.9385°W), 143 m (469 ft)
- San Cristóbal mine (MSC) Dome, Colcha "K" Municipality, Bolivia (21.1246°S 67.2096°W), 140 m (460 ft)
- Ruwais Refinery Dome, Ruwais, United Arab Emirates (24.1459°N 52.7392°E), 135 m (443 ft)

== See also ==
- Fly's Eye Dome – Prototype house designed by R. Buckminster Fuller
- Geodesic grid – Spatial grid based on a geodesic polyhedron
- Hoberman sphere – Structure that resembles a geodesic dome
