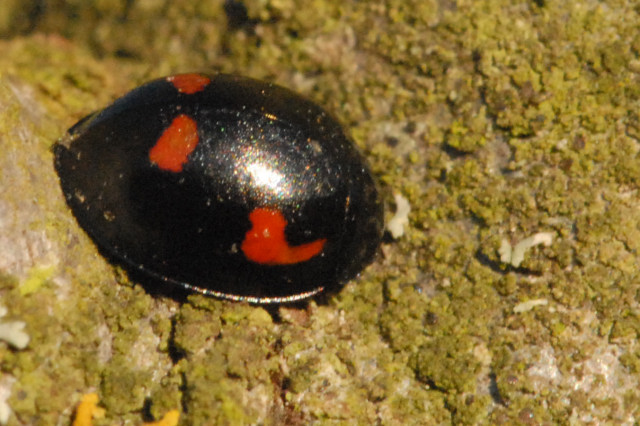
- Adult Brumus quadripustulatus

Scientific classification
- Kingdom: Animalia
- Phylum: Arthropoda
- Clade: Pancrustacea
- Class: Insecta
- Order: Coleoptera
- Suborder: Polyphaga
- Infraorder: Cucujiformia
- Family: Coccinellidae
- Tribe: Chilocorini
- Genus: Brumus; Mulsant, 1850

Species
- See text

= Brumus =

Genus of beetles

Brumus is a genus of beetle of the family Coccinellidae.

== Species ==
- Brumus bella Wollaston
- Brumus cedri (J. Sahlberg, 1913)
- Brumus fulviventris Fairmare
- Brumus mongolicus Fleischer, 1900
- Brumus nigrifrons Gerst
- Brumus oblongus (Weidenbach, 1859)
- Brumus octosignatus (Gebler, 1830)
- Brumus quadriplagiatus Wollaston, 1864
- Brumus quadripustulatus (Linnaeus, 1758)

== Selected former species ==
- Brumus ceylonicus Weise, 1900
