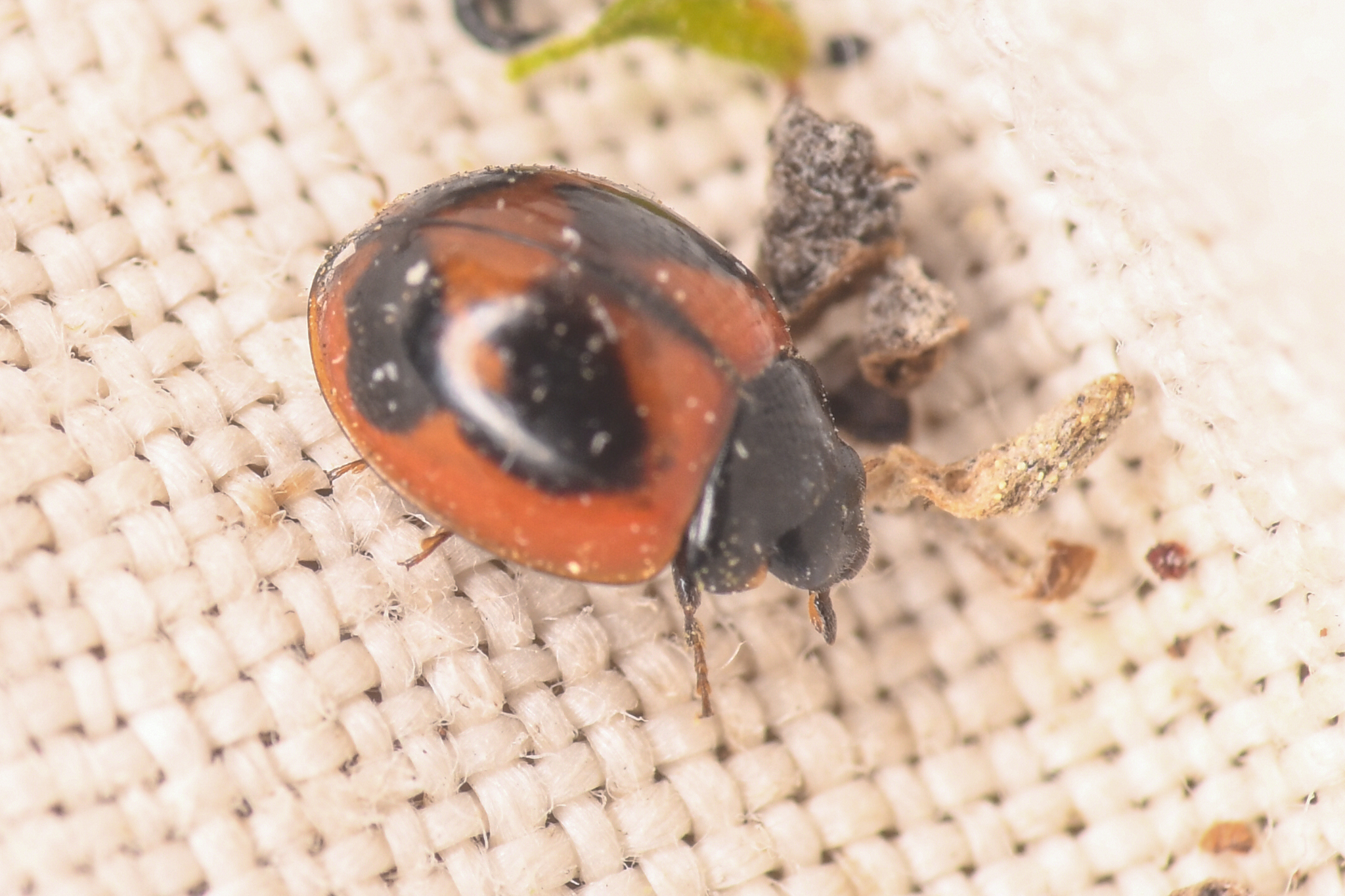

Scientific classification
- Kingdom: Animalia
- Phylum: Arthropoda
- Clade: Pancrustacea
- Class: Insecta
- Order: Coleoptera
- Suborder: Polyphaga
- Infraorder: Cucujiformia
- Family: Coccinellidae
- Genus: Exochomus
- Species: E. fasciatus

Binomial name
- Exochomus fasciatus Casey, 1899

= Exochomus fasciatus =

Species of beetle

Exochomus fasciatus is a species of lady beetle in the family Coccinellidae. It is found in North America, where it has been recorded from southern California.

== Description ==
Adults reach a length of about 2.60-3.70 mm. The colour pattern is variable, and is either similar to that of Exochomus marginipennis, or to a typical specimen of Exochomus childreni.
