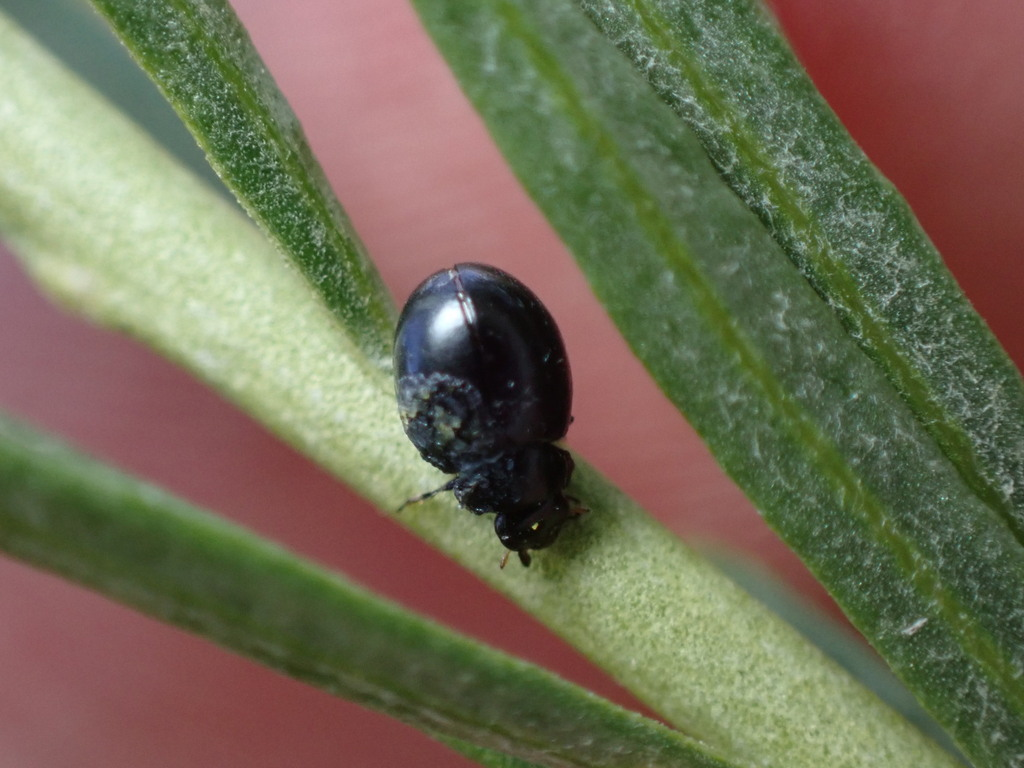

Scientific classification
- Kingdom: Animalia
- Phylum: Arthropoda
- Clade: Pancrustacea
- Class: Insecta
- Order: Coleoptera
- Suborder: Polyphaga
- Infraorder: Cucujiformia
- Family: Coccinellidae
- Genus: Exochomus
- Species: E. townsendi

Binomial name
- Exochomus townsendi Casey, 1908

= Exochomus townsendi =

Species of beetle

Exochomus townsendi is a species of lady beetle in the family Coccinellidae. It is found in Central America (Mexico) and North America (Colorado).

== Description ==
Adults reach a length of about 2.80-3.30 mm. The colour of the adults is as in Exochomus aethiops.
