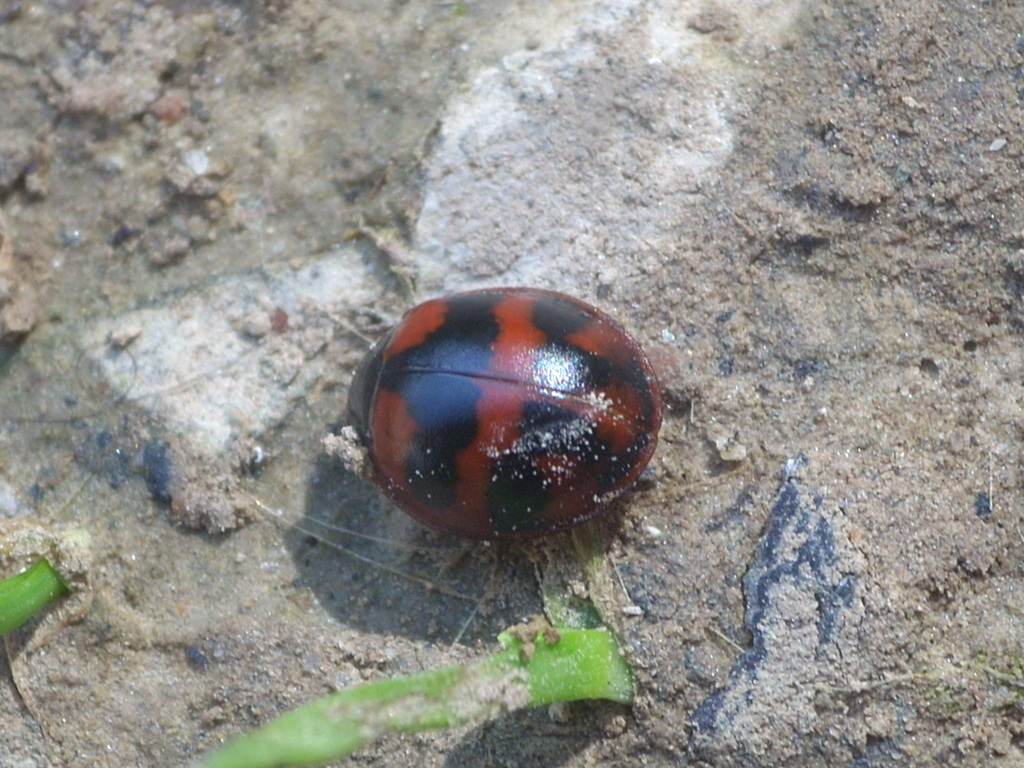

Scientific classification
- Kingdom: Animalia
- Phylum: Arthropoda
- Clade: Pancrustacea
- Class: Insecta
- Order: Coleoptera
- Suborder: Polyphaga
- Infraorder: Cucujiformia
- Family: Coccinellidae
- Genus: Exochomus
- Species: E. septemmaculatus

Binomial name
- Exochomus septemmaculatus (Weise, 1885)

Synonyms
- Exochomus undulatus var. septemmaculatus Weise, 1885; Brumus septemmaculatus

= Exochomus septemmaculatus =

Species of beetle

Exochomus septemmaculatus is a species of beetle of the family Coccinellidae. It is found in Uzbekistan and Kazakhstan.

== Description ==
Adults reach a length of about 3.92–4.67 mm (0.154–0.184 in) in males and 3.67–4.75 mm (0.144–0.187 in) in females. The head is brown to black with yellowish-brown antennae. The pronotum is dark brown to black with orange to reddish anterior and lateral margins. The scutellum is reddish-brown to black and the elytra are reddish, each with a transverse band in the anterior half and two or three dark brown to black spots in posterior half.

== Life history ==
They have been recorded preying on Parthenolecanium corni and Rhodococcus turanicus.
