= Exochomus kiritshenkoi =

Scientific classification
- Kingdom: Animalia
- Phylum: Arthropoda
- Clade: Pancrustacea
- Class: Insecta
- Order: Coleoptera
- Suborder: Polyphaga
- Infraorder: Cucujiformia
- Family: Coccinellidae
- Genus: Exochomus
- Species: E. kiritshenkoi

Binomial name
- Exochomus kiritshenkoi Barovsky, 1922

Species of beetle

Exochomus kiritshenkoi is a species of beetle of the family Coccinellidae. It is found in central Asia, Tajikistan, Kyrgyzstan, Kazakhstan and Mongolia.

== Description ==
Adults reach a length of about 5.2–5.5 mm (0.20–0.22 in). The head is black with yellowish-brown antennae. The pronotum is black with the anterior and lateral margins yellowish-red. The scutellum is black and the elytra are yellowish-red, with a black stripe on the lateral margins and each elytron with four black spots.

== Life history ==
They have been recorded preying on aphids.
