= George Children =

English banker and magistrate (1742–1818)

George Children JP
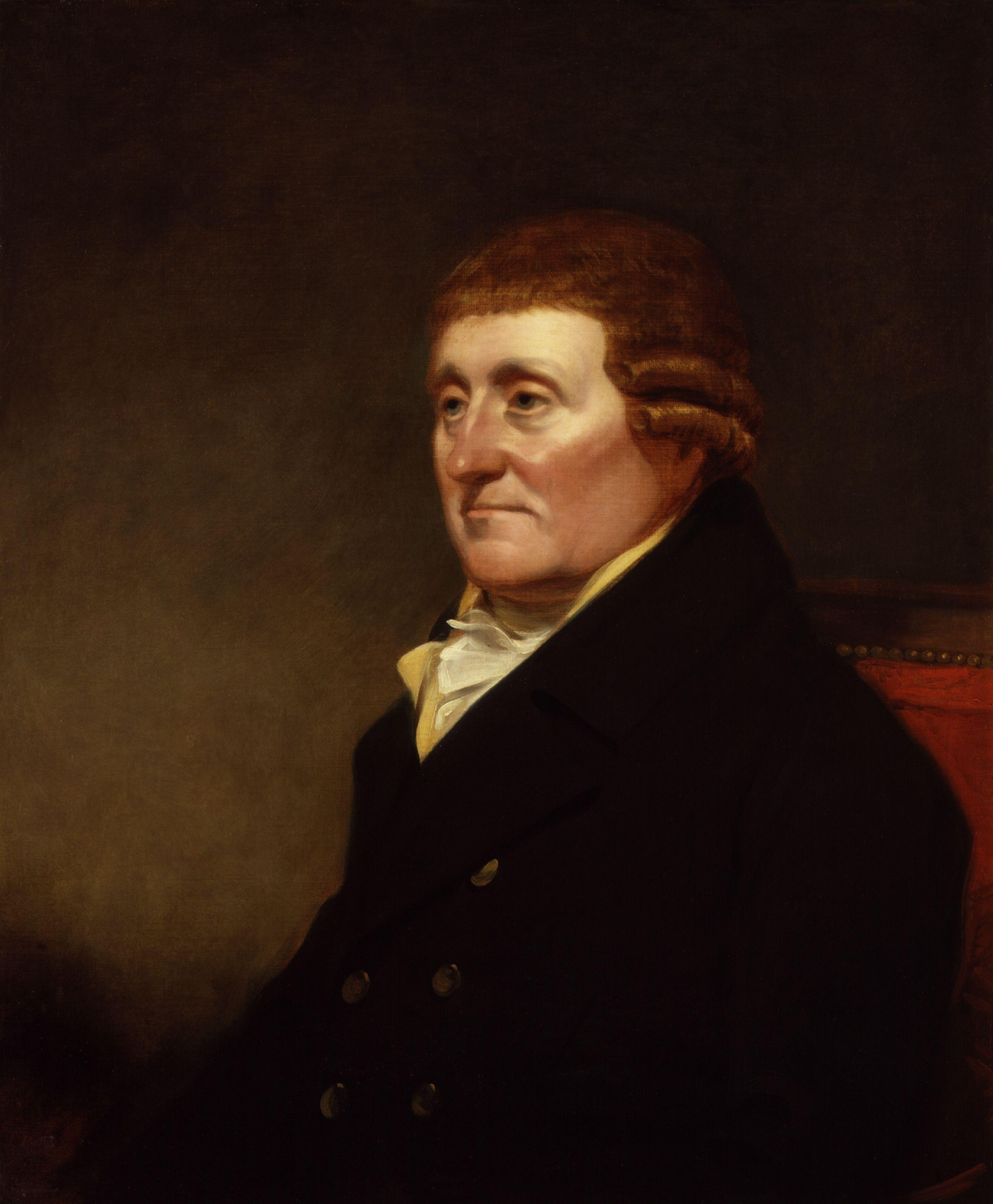
- Portrait of George Children by Archer James Oliver, c. 1806
- Born: 1742; Leigh, Kent, England
- Died: 1818 (aged 75–76); Chelsea, Middlesex, England
- Education: Tonbridge School; Oriel College, Oxford
- Occupations: Banker, magistrate, landowner
- Known for: Co-founder of the Tonbridge Bank
- Spouse: Susanna Marshall Jordan
- Children: John George Children
- Parents: John Children (father); Jane Weller (mother)

George Children (1742–1818) was an English banker, landowner and magistrate of Tonbridge, Kent. He is best known as one of the founders of the Tonbridge Bank and as the father of the scientist, mineralogist and museum curator John George Children.

== Early life and public life ==
Arms of Children of Childrens

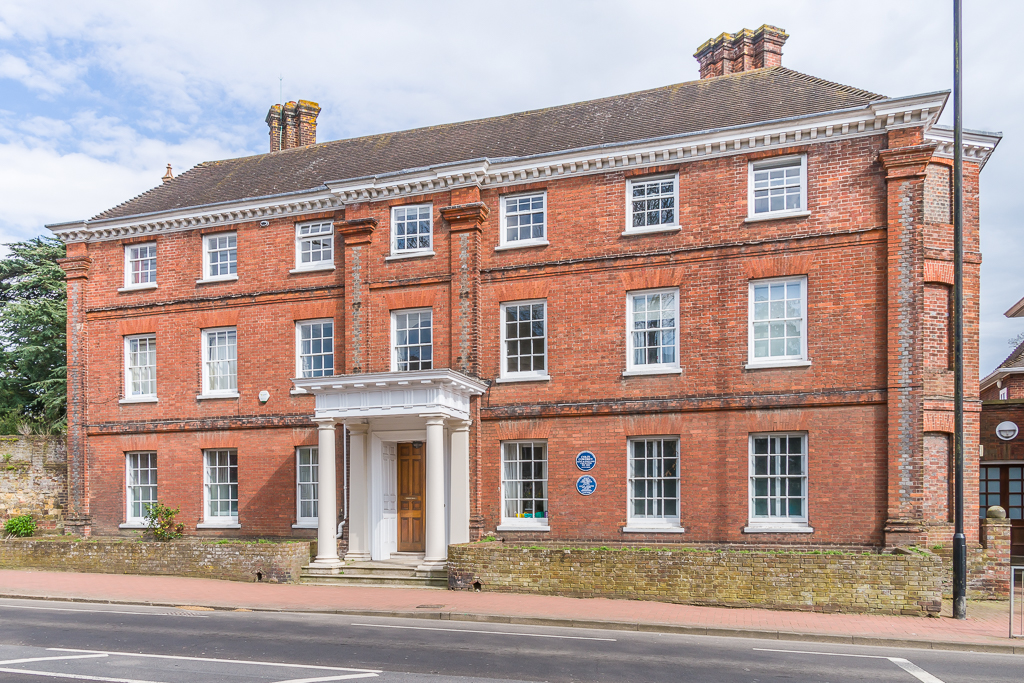
Ferox Hall, home of George Children

Children was born in Leigh in 1742 and belonged to a family of the Kentish landed gentry, seated since the 14th century in a property named for them, Childrens in Hildenborough. He was brought up at Ferox Hall, the grand mansion in Tonbridge that his father had had rebuilt in its current form in 1755.

Children graduated from Oriel College, Oxford in 1762 was called to the Bar at Middle Temple in 1767 but never practiced law. He became a prominent member of Kent society and was associated with local public affairs throughout his life. He served as a justice of the peace for approximately fifty years and was Under-Sheriff of Kent and Sussex.

In 1776 he married Susanna Marshall Jordan, daughter of the Reverend Thomas Marshall Jordan of West Farleigh. Their only child, John George Children, was born in 1777. Susanna died six days after the birth, after which Children devoted himself to the upbringing of his son.

== Tonbridge Bank ==
In about 1792, Children joined William Woodgate of Somerhill and William Scoones in establishing the Tonbridge Bank, a private banking partnership serving Tonbridge and the surrounding district.

The bank operated during the period of the French Revolutionary and Napoleonic Wars. Financial difficulties eventually overwhelmed the business, and the partners became liable for its debts. By 1817 both Children and Woodgate had been declared bankrupt, and their principal residences, Ferox Hall and Somerhill respectively, were offered for sale.

The bank collapsed in 1809 and Children was declared bankrupt in 1816, leading to the sale of Ferox Hall and his other properties (including Ramhurst Manor).

== Support of science ==
Before the failure of the bank, Children used his wealth and estate to support the scientific interests of his son. He provided the money and facilities that enabled John George Children to pursue scientific investigations, particularly in the field of electricity following the discoveries of the early nineteenth century.

The financial losses resulting from the bank's collapse contributed to the younger Children's decision to pursue salaried employment, eventually leading to his long association with the British Museum.

== Death and legacy ==
Children died in 1818 in a house in Chelsea bought for him by his son John George Children. Contemporary local accounts described him as a well-regarded figure in Tonbridge, and his death was widely noted in the town.

Although largely overshadowed by the achievements of his son, Children played a significant role in the commercial history of west Kent through the establishment of the Tonbridge Bank and his involvement in local affairs.
