= John George Children =

British scientist (1777–1852)

John George Children FRS FRSE FLS PRES DL
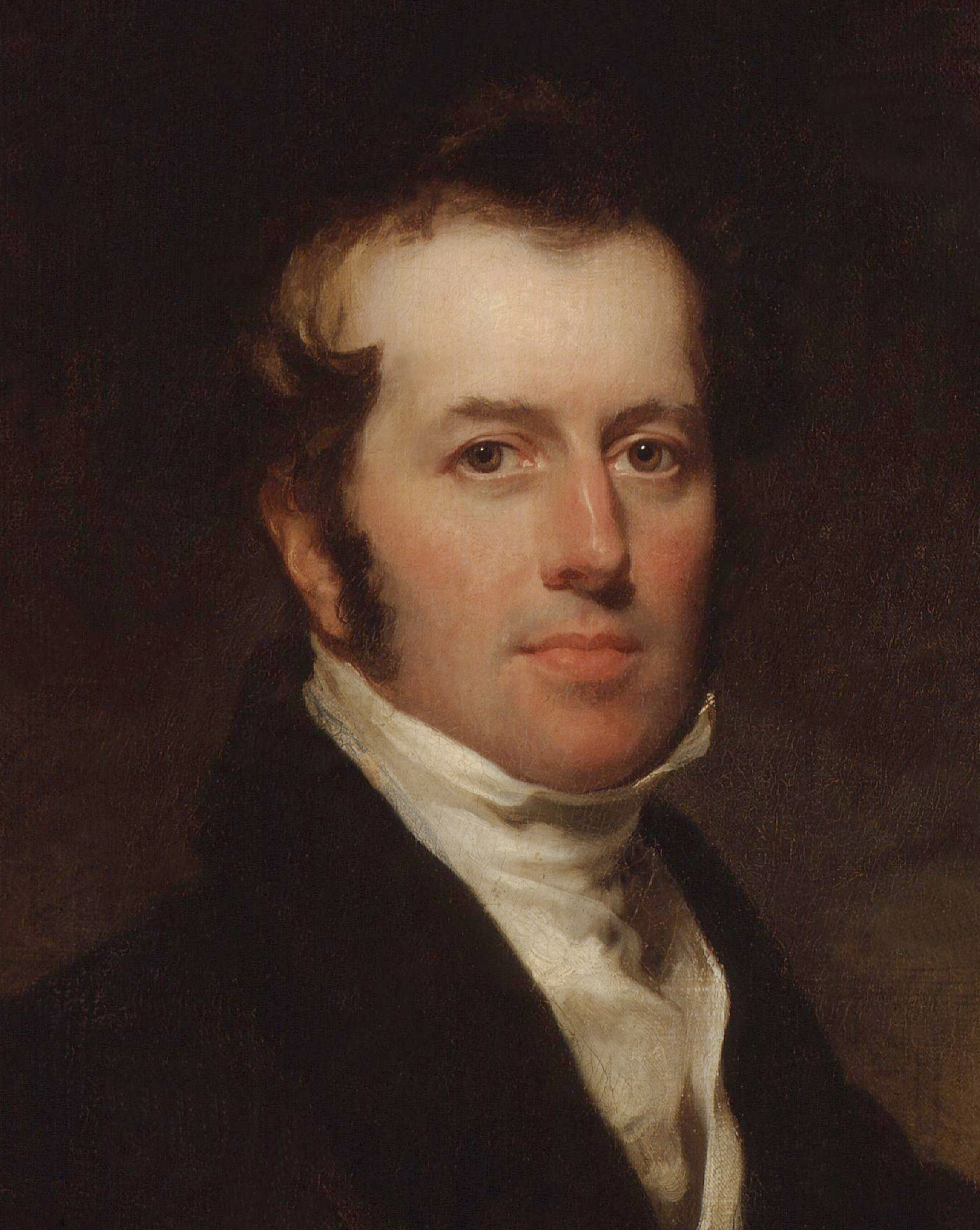
- Portrait of Children by Benjamin Rawlinson Faulkner - 1826
- Born: 18 May 1777; Ferox Hall, Tonbridge, Kent
- Died: 1 January 1852 (aged 74); Halstead, Kent
- Education: Tonbridge School; Eton College; Queens' College, Cambridge
- Spouses: Hester Anna Holwell; Caroline Wise; Eliza Towers
- Relatives: George Children (father); Anna Atkins (daughter); Jane Austen (third cousin)
- Scientific career
- Awards: Royal Institution Medal (1828)
- Fields: Chemist, mineralogist and zoologist
- Workplaces: British Museum
- Military career
- Allegiance: United Kingdom
- Service years: 1803–1805
- Rank: Captain
- Units: West Kent Militia

John George Children FRS FRSE FLS PRES DL (18 May 1777 – 1 January 1852 in Halstead, Kent) was a British chemist, mineralogist and zoologist. Children established a chemical laboratory at his father's home Ferox Hall and conducted experiments into galvanic cells. Following Children's father's bankruptcy and sale of the family estates in 1812 he was forced to seek employment, and in 1816 following a failed attempt at establishing a gunpowder business with his friend Sir Humphry Davy he became the assistant librarian of the department of antiquities at the British Museum in London. In 1822 Davy helped him secure a controversial appointment to the post of assistant keeper of the Natural History Department of the British Museum. He later served as Keeper of the Zoological Department following the division of the Natural History Department into three distinct departments in 1837 (though he had managed the Zoological collections since 1823), he remained in this post until his retirement from the museum in 1840. Along with Davy he built a large galvanic cell, assisted him in experiments and invented a method to extract silver from ore without the need for mercury. Children was also the founding president of the Royal Entomological Society. His daughter Anna Atkins became a pioneer of botanical photography.

== Personal life and early career ==
Arms of Children of Childrens, Hildenborough

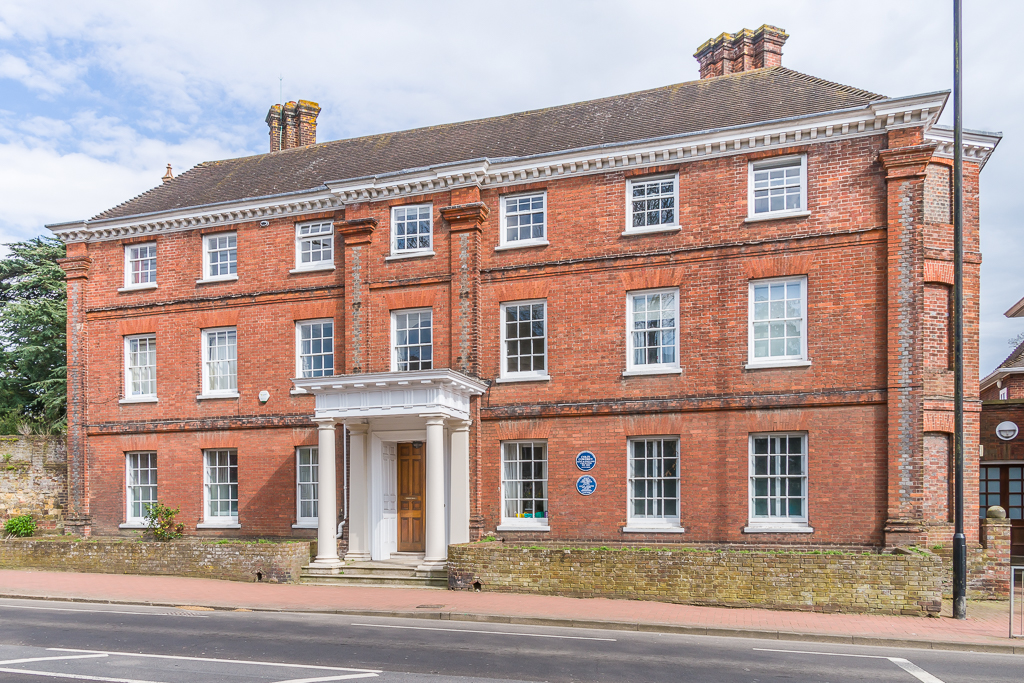
Ferox Hall

John George was born on 18 May 1777 at Ferox Hall, Tonbridge, Kent. His father, George Children (1742–1818), a banker, belonged to a family of the landed gentry that lived at the house named Childrens, near Nether Street in Hildenborough; his mother, Susanna, who was the daughter of Rev. Thomas Marshall Jordan of West Farleigh, died six days after he was born.

Children studied at Tonbridge School, Eton College and later at Queens' College, Cambridge. In 1798, he married Hester Anna Holwell, granddaughter of John Zephaniah Holwell. After her unexpected passing, in 1800, he began to travel with more regularity. He also established a chemical laboratory at Ferox Hall. He went on to marry another woman, Caroline Wise (daughter of George Furlong Wise of Woolston), in 1809; she also died the following year. In 1812 the collapse of the Tonbridge Bank led to financial problems. In 1816 his father was declared bankrupt. It was then that he found work as a librarian. In 1819, he married Eliza Towers, the two remaining together until her death, twenty years later, in 1839.

Children served briefly in the West Kent Militia but resigned in 1805 due to poor health. In 1808 he travelled to the battlefield of Vimiero in Portugal. In 1815, Children travelled to the battlefield at Waterloo along with his daughter Anna and a cousin Lieutenant George Whitehead. There he noticed that the Waterloo Elm, a tree under which the Duke of Wellington had made his headquarters, was being stripped bare by souvenir-hunters. Anna drew a picture of the tree. He purchased the tree with the intent that it should be converted into furniture and gifted to the Prince Regent. Once purchased, he had the tree made into pieces of furniture by Thomas Chippendale at Apsley House and Belvoir Castle. An armchair was sent to Carlton House on 24 February 1821 which is now in the Royal Collection. A Latin inscription on the chair was based on a suggestion from the Marquess of Wellesley.

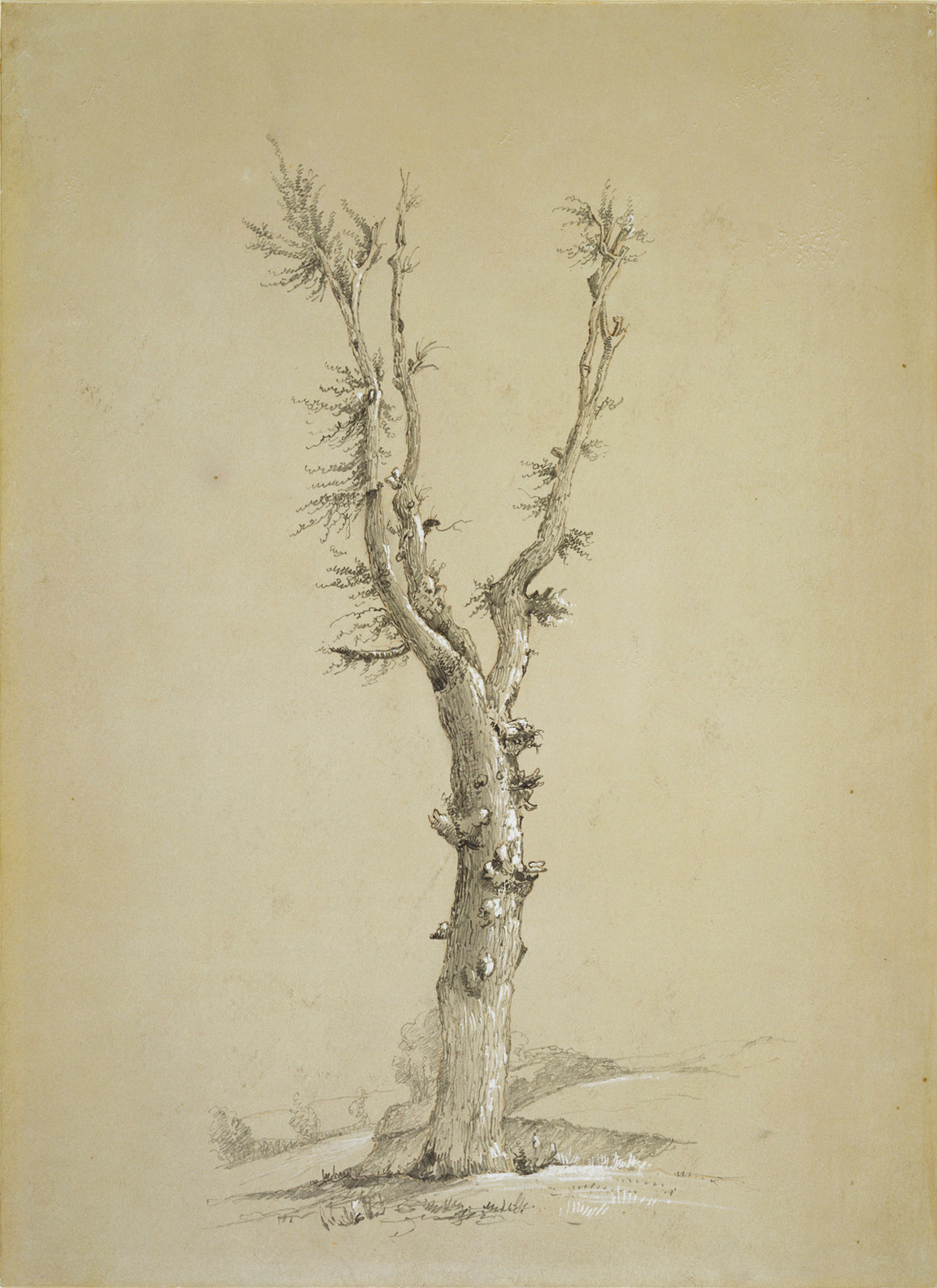
The Waterloo Elm prior to being cut down, sketch by Anna, 1818

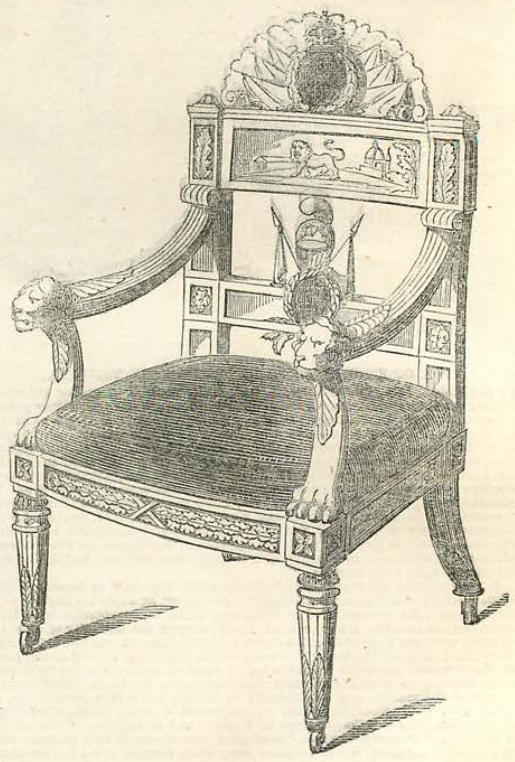
The chair made by Chippendale and presented to the Duke of Wellington

He died at Halstead Place in Kent, the home of his daughter Anna Atkins and her husband John Pelly Atkins, the Children family having lost their many properties following the collapse of the Tonbridge Bank.

== Scientific career ==
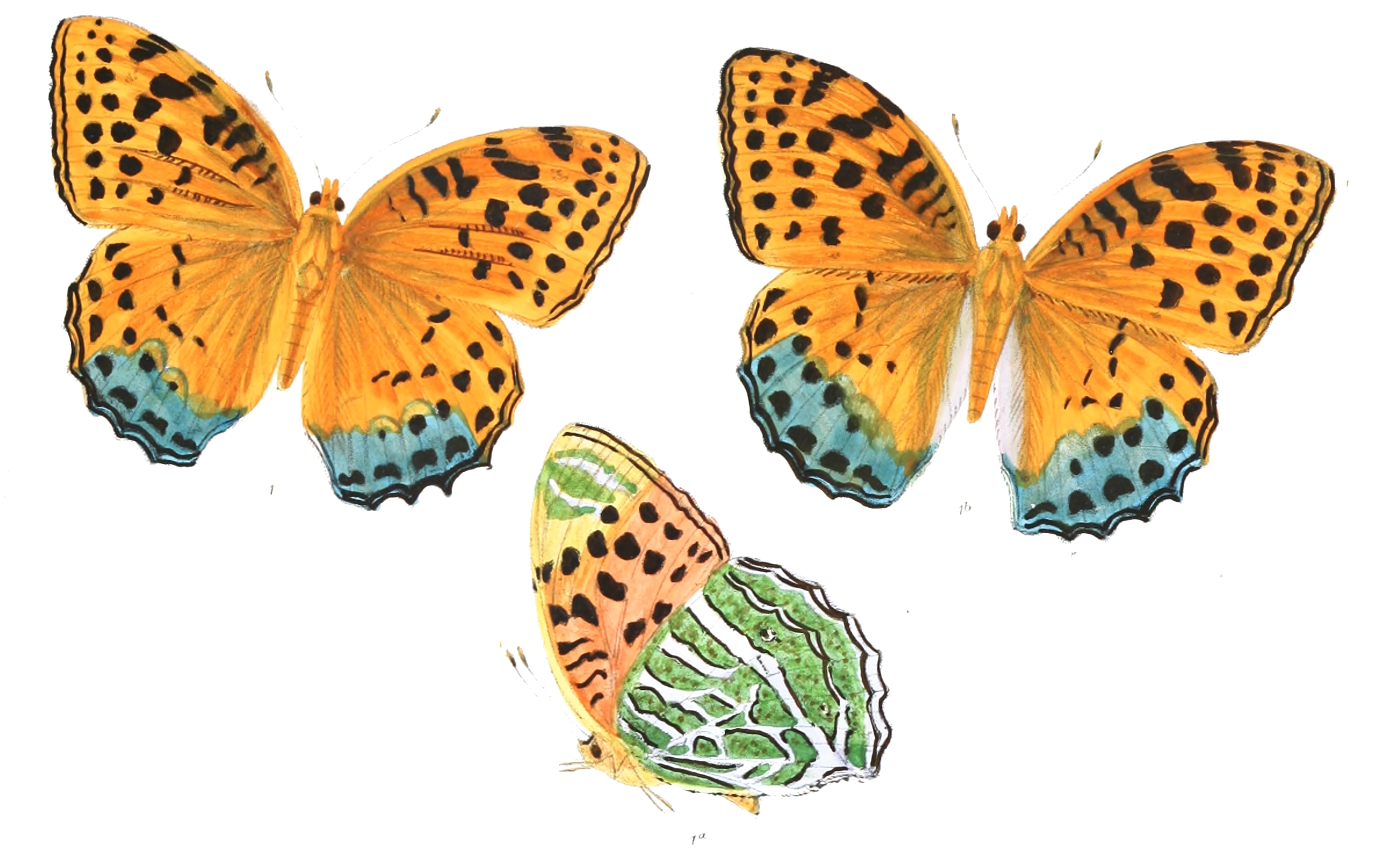
The large silverstripe butterfly Argynnis childreni was named after him by Gray.

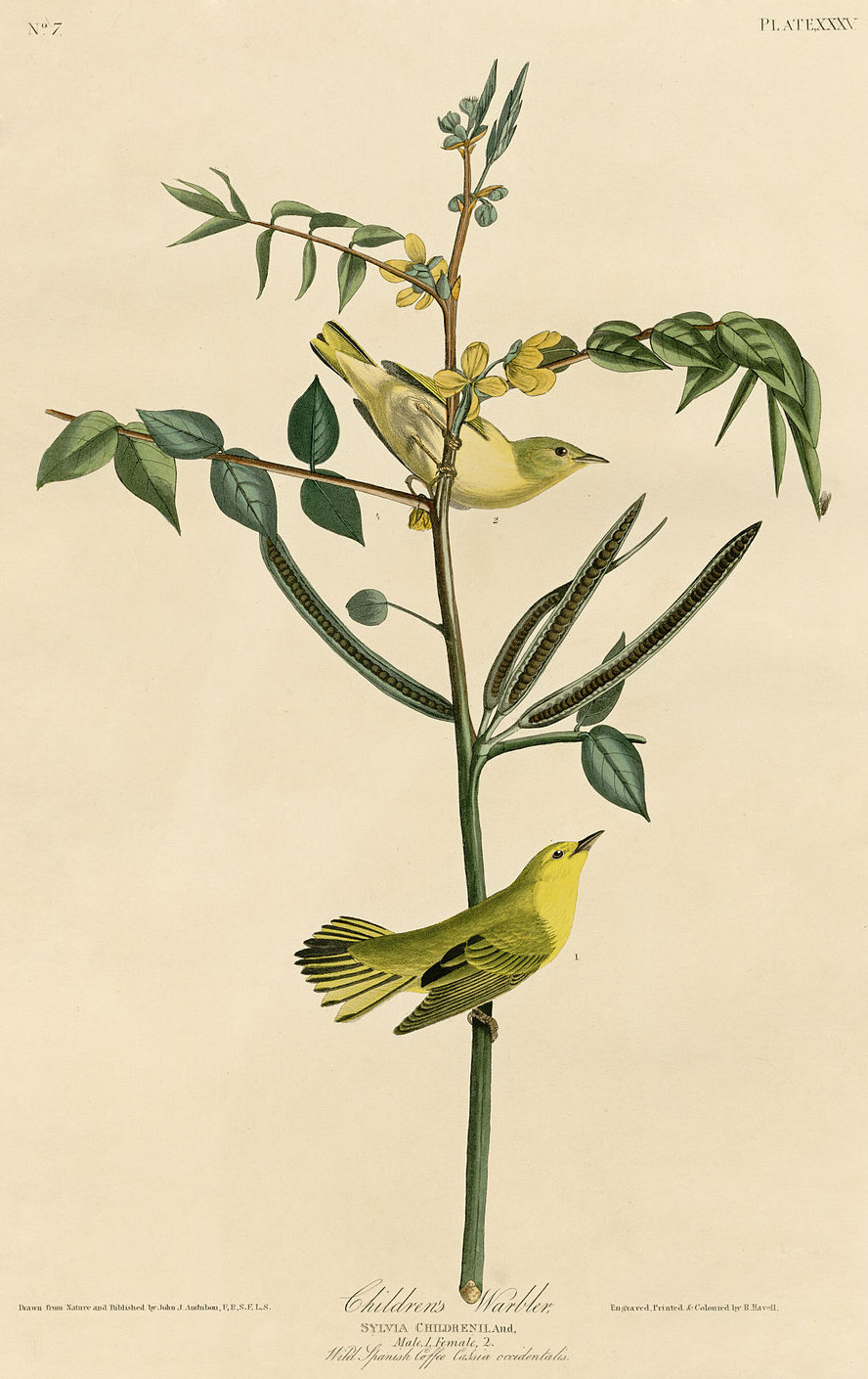
Audubon's plate of "Children's Warbler"

Children was a friend of Sir Humphry Davy and together they conducted several experiments. In 1808 he visited Spain where he met Joseph Blanco White. In 1813 he constructed a large galvanic cell and conducted experiments using them. These were published in Philosophical Transactions in 1815 and for this he received the Royal Institution medal in 1828. Following the bankruptcy of his father, he began to work on a gunpowder business with Davy but this did not last. In 1822, he found a position as an assistant librarian through Lord Camden in the Department of Antiquities at the British Museum when he was appointed assistant keeper of the Natural History Department in succession to William Elford Leach. The appointment, influenced by Sir Humphry Davy, was controversial as he was less qualified than another applicant, William Swainson. Children found himself poorly qualified in zoology and depended greatly on John Edward Gray who worked as a day-worker. Gray's own application to the post that Children held had been passed over due to rivalries with influential members of the Linnean Society. Some visitors to the British Museum like Edward Blyth found him uncooperative. After the division of the Department into three sections in 1837 he became keeper of the Department of Zoology, retiring in 1840 and succeeded by his assistant John Edward Gray. After his retirement he took an interest in astronomy.

Around 1823-24, there was an interest in silver mining in South America and there was a search for silver extraction techniques that did not need expensive mercury. Children found a process that he sold to several companies including Real del Monte and United Mexicans.

Children was made a fellow of the Royal Society in 1807, and served as the society's secretary in 1826, and from 1830 to 1837. In 1833, he was founding president of what became the Royal Entomological Society of London. His name is commemorated in the names of several species, most described by Gray or his brother, including the Australian Children's python, Antaresia childreni, the Australian stick insect Tropidoderus childrenii, the North American lady beetle Exochomus childreni as well as a mineral called childrenite. John James Audubon named Sylvia childrenii (or Children's warbler) after him, stating "I have named it after my most esteemed friend, J. G. Children, Esq. of the British Museum, as a tribute of sincere gratitude for the unremitted kindness which he has shewn me" but that is a junior name as the specimen it was based on was of a juvenile of the already described yellow warbler.

== Family ==
Children's only daughter (from his first wife Hester Anna) was Anna Atkins, a botanist, who is best known for her book of cyanotype photograms of algae, the first book of exclusively photographic images ever made. She wrote a memoir on the life of her father which included several unpublished poems.
