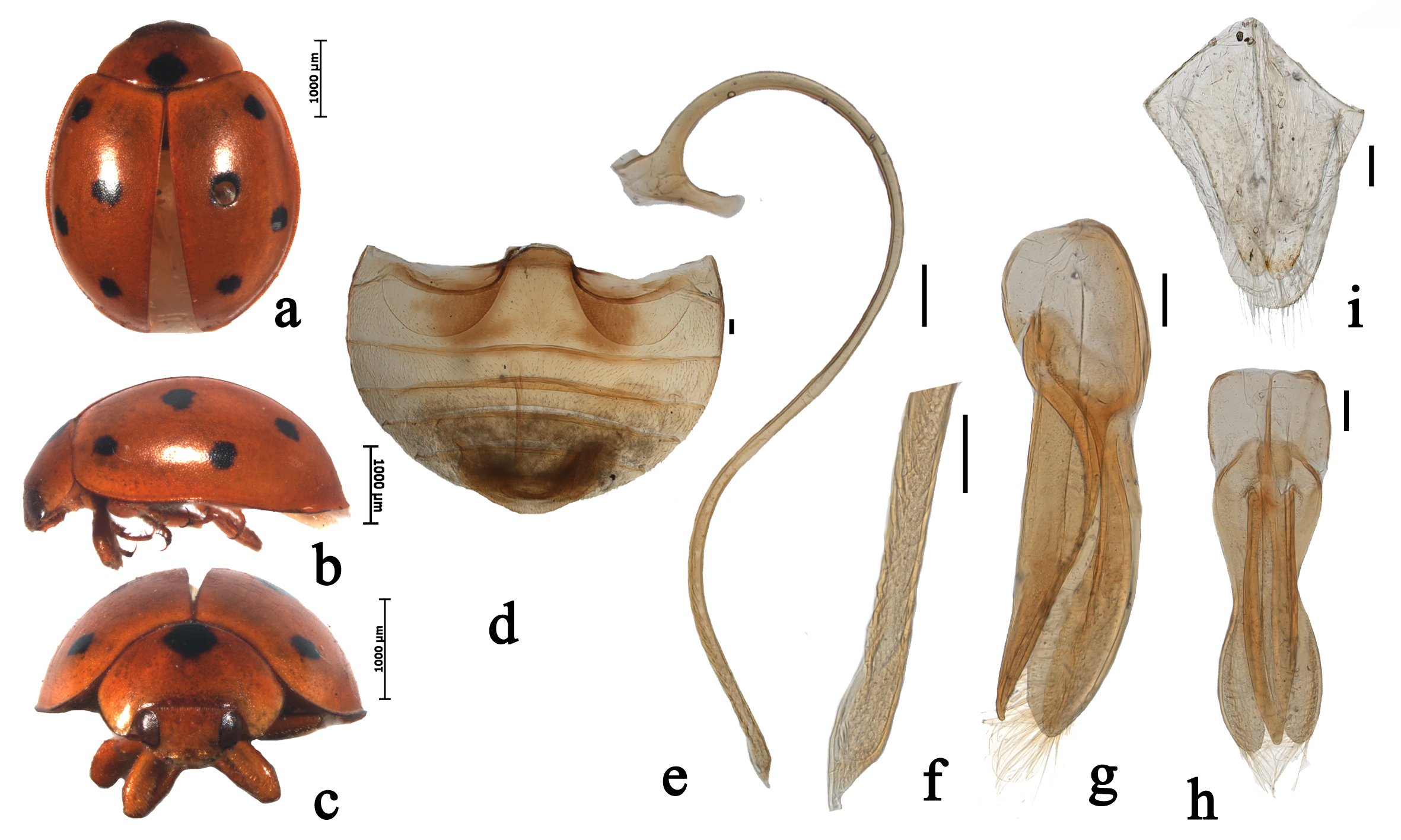

Scientific classification
- Kingdom: Animalia
- Phylum: Arthropoda
- Clade: Pancrustacea
- Class: Insecta
- Order: Coleoptera
- Suborder: Polyphaga
- Infraorder: Cucujiformia
- Family: Coccinellidae
- Genus: Exochomus
- Species: E. octosignatus

Binomial name
- Exochomus octosignatus (Gebler, 1830)

Synonyms
- Coccinella octosignata Gebler, 1830; Brumus octosignatus; Brumus octosignatus var. conjunctus Fleischer, 1900; Brumus octosignatus var. lasioides Weise, 1879; Coccinella deserta Motschulsky, 1840; Coccinella desertorum Gebler, 1841

= Exochomus octosignatus =

Species of beetle

Exochomus octosignatus is a species of beetle of the family Coccinellidae. It is found on Corsica and Sicily and in Turkey, Iraq, Iran, Afghanistan, southern Russia, central Asia, Korea and Mongolia.

== Description ==
Adults reach a length of about 2.89–4.27 mm (0.114–0.168 in) in males and about 2.71–4.5 mm (0.107–0.177 in) in females. The head and antennae are reddish-orange. The pronotum is reddish-orange a black spot before the scutellum. The scutellum is black and the elytra are reddish-orange with a somewhat darker border and each elytron with four black spots.

== Life history ==
They have been recorded preying on aphids, including Aphis craccivora, Macrosiphum jaceae, Xerobion eriosomatinum, Xerophilaphis zawadovskii, Xerophilaphis atraphaxidis and Ephedraphis ephedrae, as well as on the larvae of Phytonomus variabilis.
