= Exochomus bifasciatus =

Scientific classification
- Kingdom: Animalia
- Phylum: Arthropoda
- Clade: Pancrustacea
- Class: Insecta
- Order: Coleoptera
- Suborder: Polyphaga
- Infraorder: Cucujiformia
- Family: Coccinellidae
- Genus: Exochomus
- Species: E. bifasciatus

Binomial name
- Exochomus bifasciatus Barovsky, 1927

Synonyms
- Brumus bifasciatus

Species of beetle

Exochomus bifasciatus is a species of beetle of the family Coccinellidae. It was described from the Tian Shan mountains in Central Asia.

== Description ==
Adults reach a length of about 3.5 mm (0.14 in). The species is characterized by the dark pigmentation of the pronotum and two transverse black bands on the elytra.

== Taxonomy ==
The species is known only from the original description.
