= Exochomus discors =

Scientific classification
- Kingdom: Animalia
- Phylum: Arthropoda
- Clade: Pancrustacea
- Class: Insecta
- Order: Coleoptera
- Suborder: Polyphaga
- Infraorder: Cucujiformia
- Family: Coccinellidae
- Genus: Exochomus
- Species: E. discors

Binomial name
- Exochomus discors (Barovsky, 1927)

Synonyms
- Brumus discors Barovsky, 1927

Species of beetle

Exochomus discors is a species of beetle of the family Coccinellidae. It is found in Tajikistan, Kyrgyzstan and possibly eastern Uzbekistan.

== Description ==
Adults reach a length of about 3–3.6 mm (0.12–0.14 in). The head is black and the antennae are yellowish-orange. The pronotum is yellowish-oragne with a black spot in the middle. The scutellum is black and the elytra are yellowish-orange, each with four black spots.
