= Exochomus cedri =

Scientific classification
- Kingdom: Animalia
- Phylum: Arthropoda
- Clade: Pancrustacea
- Class: Insecta
- Order: Coleoptera
- Suborder: Polyphaga
- Infraorder: Cucujiformia
- Family: Coccinellidae
- Genus: Exochomus
- Species: E. cedri

Binomial name
- Exochomus cedri (Sahlberg, 1913)

Synonyms
- Exochomus quadripustulatus var. cedri Sahlberg, 1913; Exochomus muelleri Mader, 1931

Species of beetle

Exochomus cedri is a species of beetle of the family Coccinellidae. It is found in Lebanon, Turkey, Greece, Bulgaria, former Yugoslavia, Albania, the Czech Republic and Slovakia.

== Description ==
Adults reach a length of about 2.75–3.68 mm (0.108–0.145 in) in males and 3.01–3.87 mm (0.119–0.152 in) in females. The head is black with brownish-yellow antennae. The pronotum is black with yellowish anterior and lateral margins and sometimes with a yellow spot at the anterior corners. The scutellum and elytra are black, each elytron with two or three yellowish-orange to red spots.
