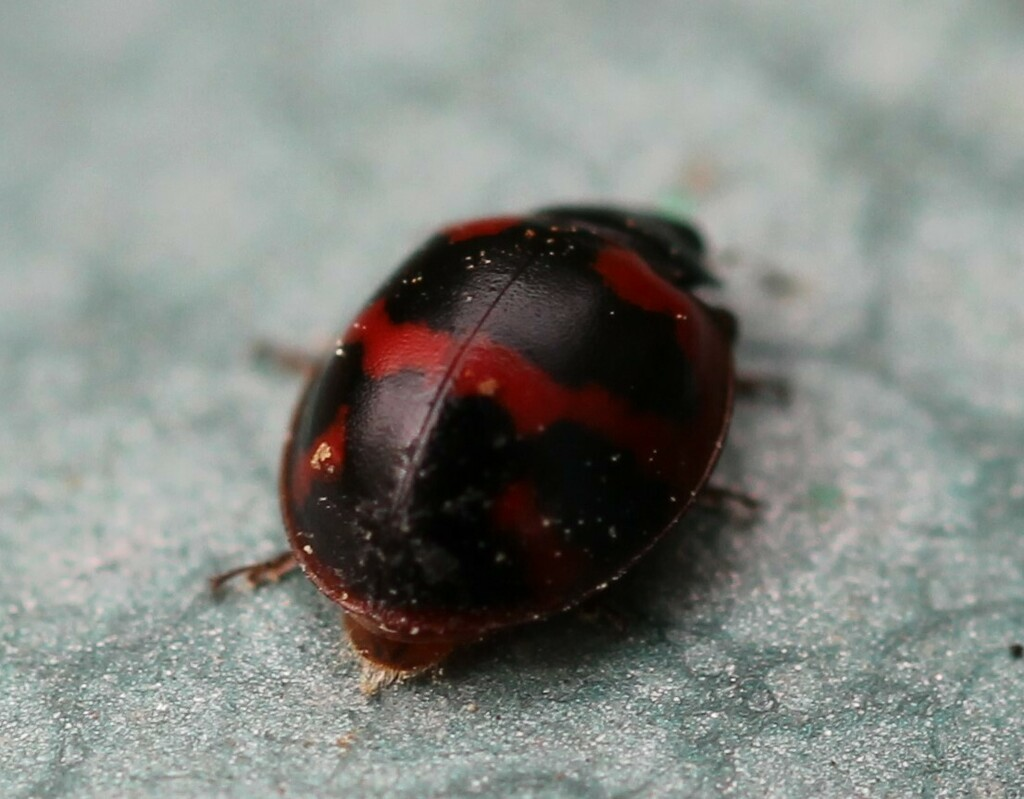

Scientific classification
- Kingdom: Animalia
- Phylum: Arthropoda
- Clade: Pancrustacea
- Class: Insecta
- Order: Coleoptera
- Suborder: Polyphaga
- Infraorder: Cucujiformia
- Family: Coccinellidae
- Genus: Exochomus
- Species: E. undulatus

Binomial name
- Exochomus undulatus Weise, 1879

Synonyms
- Brumus undulatus

= Exochomus undulatus =

Species of beetle

Exochomus undulatus is a species of beetle of the family Coccinellidae. It is found in south-western Russia, Azerbaijan, Tajikistan, Iran and Israel.

== Description ==
Adults reach a length of about 3.12–4.17 mm (0.123–0.164 in) in males and 3.64–4.4 mm (0.143–0.173 in) in females. The head is brown to black with brownish-orange antennae. The pronotum is brown to black, with orange anterior and lateral margins and small orange spots at the anterior corners in males. The scutellum is brownish-orange to black and the elytra are brownish-orange, each with transverse band in the anterior half two or three brown to black spots in the posterior half.
