= Exochomus mongol =

Scientific classification
- Kingdom: Animalia
- Phylum: Arthropoda
- Clade: Pancrustacea
- Class: Insecta
- Order: Coleoptera
- Suborder: Polyphaga
- Infraorder: Cucujiformia
- Family: Coccinellidae
- Genus: Exochomus
- Species: E. mongol

Binomial name
- Exochomus mongol Barovsky, 1922

Synonyms
- Exochomus freyi Fürsch, 1960 (preocc.); Exochomus georgi Fürsch, 1963; Brumus mongol

Species of beetle

Exochomus mongol is a species of beetle of the family Coccinellidae. It is found in Mongolia, Korea, China and Russia (Siberia, Russian Far East).

== Description ==
Adults reach a length of about 3.28–4.25 mm (0.129–0.167 in) in males and 3.9–4.62 mm (0.154–0.182 in) in females. The head is black with yellowish-brown antennae. The pronotum, scutellum and elytra are black, each elytron with two yellowish-red spots.

== Life history ==
They have been recorded preying on coccids.
