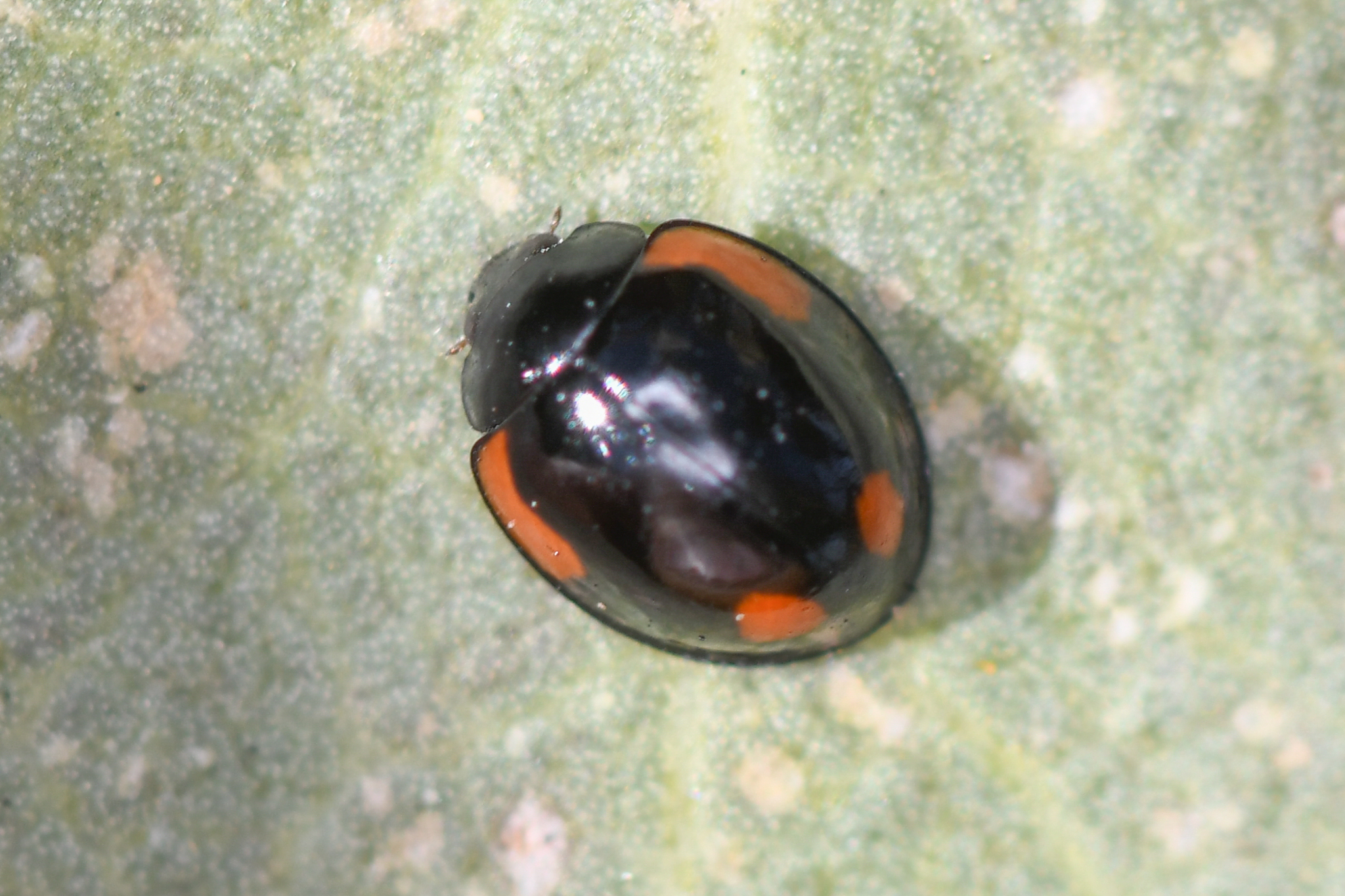

Scientific classification
- Kingdom: Animalia
- Phylum: Arthropoda
- Clade: Pancrustacea
- Class: Insecta
- Order: Coleoptera
- Suborder: Polyphaga
- Infraorder: Cucujiformia
- Family: Coccinellidae
- Genus: Exochomus
- Species: E. californicus

Binomial name
- Exochomus californicus Casey, 1899

= Exochomus californicus =

Species of beetle

Exochomus californicus is a species of lady beetle in the family Coccinellidae. It is found in North America, where it has been recorded from Washington to Nevada and northern California.

== Description ==
Adults reach a length of about 3.5-4 mm. Adults have a black head and pronotum. The elytron is black or brown with a yellow or orange rectangular humeral area and a subapical spot.
