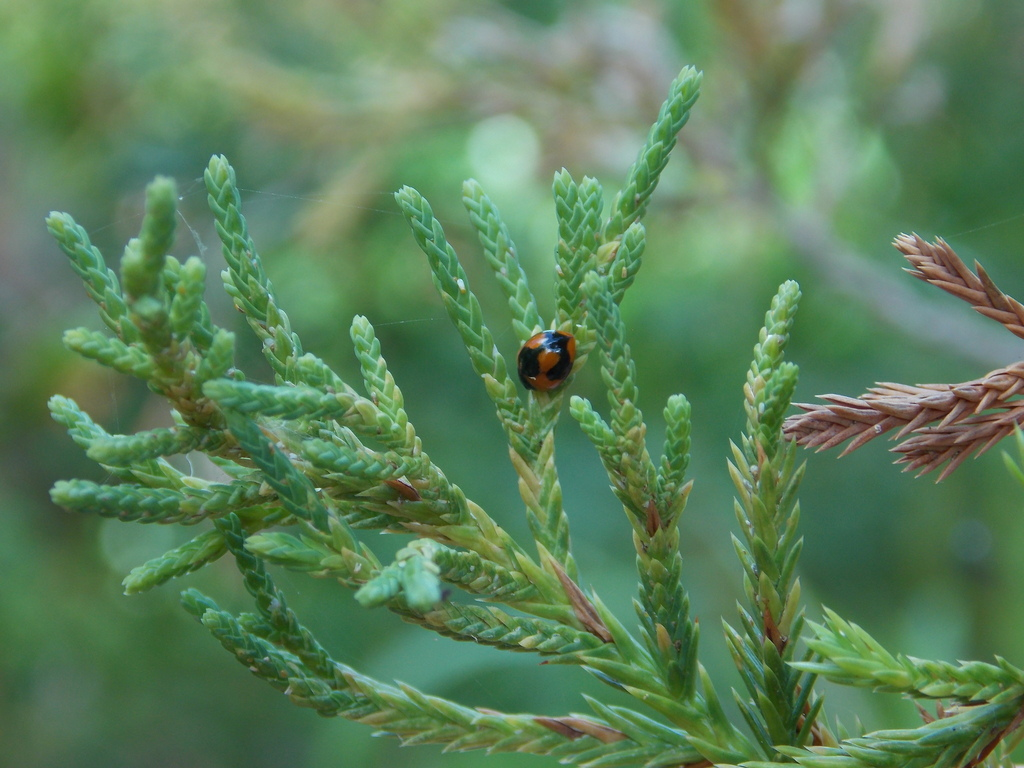

Scientific classification
- Kingdom: Animalia
- Phylum: Arthropoda
- Clade: Pancrustacea
- Class: Insecta
- Order: Coleoptera
- Suborder: Polyphaga
- Infraorder: Cucujiformia
- Family: Coccinellidae
- Genus: Exochomus
- Species: E. jamaicensis

Binomial name
- Exochomus jamaicensis Sicard, 1922

= Exochomus jamaicensis =

Species of beetle

Exochomus jamaicensis, the Jamaican shield ladybeetle, is a species of beetle of the family Coccinellidae. It is native to Jamaica and was introduced to Bermuda.

== Description ==
Adults reach a length of about 3.10–3.70 mm. Adults are black, although the anterior angle of the pronotum is yellow. The elytron is red or yellowish red with a black spot in the basal area.

== Biology ==
They prey on aphids, but also on other scale insects.
