= Exochomus decemnotatus =

Scientific classification
- Kingdom: Animalia
- Phylum: Arthropoda
- Clade: Pancrustacea
- Class: Insecta
- Order: Coleoptera
- Suborder: Polyphaga
- Infraorder: Cucujiformia
- Family: Coccinellidae
- Genus: Exochomus
- Species: E. decemnotatus

Binomial name
- Exochomus decemnotatus Gordon, 1974

Species of beetle

Exochomus decemnotatus is a species of beetle of the family Coccinellidae. It is found in Mexico (Durango).

== Description ==
Adults reach a length of about 2.83 mm (0.111 in). They are reddish yellow, the pronotum with a black spot at the base at each side of the midline. Each elytron has four black spots.
