= Exochomus oaxacus =

Scientific classification
- Kingdom: Animalia
- Phylum: Arthropoda
- Clade: Pancrustacea
- Class: Insecta
- Order: Coleoptera
- Suborder: Polyphaga
- Infraorder: Cucujiformia
- Family: Coccinellidae
- Genus: Exochomus
- Species: E. oaxacus

Binomial name
- Exochomus oaxacus Ukrainsky, 2008

Synonyms
- Exochomus minutus Gordon, 1974 (preocc.)

Species of beetle

Exochomus oaxacus is a species of beetle of the family Coccinellidae. It is found in Mexico (Oaxaca).

== Description ==
Adults reach a length of about 2.37 mm (0.093 in). The head is black and the pronotum is black with yellow antero-lateral angles. The elytra are yellow, each with four black spots.
