= Exochomus jacobsoni =

Scientific classification
- Kingdom: Animalia
- Phylum: Arthropoda
- Clade: Pancrustacea
- Class: Insecta
- Order: Coleoptera
- Suborder: Polyphaga
- Infraorder: Cucujiformia
- Family: Coccinellidae
- Genus: Exochomus
- Species: E. jacobsoni

Binomial name
- Exochomus jacobsoni (Barovsky, 1927)

Synonyms
- Brumus jacobsoni Barovsky, 1927

Species of beetle

Exochomus jacobsoni is a species of beetle of the family Coccinellidae. It is found in Uzbekistan, south-western Kazakhstan and Mongolia.

== Description ==
Adults reach a length of about 3.33–3.52 mm (0.131–0.139 in) in males and about 3.49–3.97 mm (0.137–0.156 in) in females. The head is brownish-yellow to brown and the antennae are brownish-yellow. The pronotum and elytra are brownish-yellow with brownish to black spots.
