= Exochomus quadriguttatus =

Scientific classification
- Kingdom: Animalia
- Phylum: Arthropoda
- Clade: Pancrustacea
- Class: Insecta
- Order: Coleoptera
- Suborder: Polyphaga
- Infraorder: Cucujiformia
- Family: Coccinellidae
- Genus: Exochomus
- Species: E. quadriguttatus

Binomial name
- Exochomus quadriguttatus (Fleischer, 1900)

Synonyms
- Exochomus quadripustulatus var. quadriguttatus Fleischer, 1900; Exochomus illaesicollis Roubal, 1927; Exochomus quadripustulatus ab. cordiformis Roubal, 1926

Species of beetle

Exochomus quadriguttatus is a species of beetle of the family Coccinellidae. It is found in Russia (Caucasus), Armenia and Turkey.

== Description ==
Adults reach a length of about 3.46–3.96 mm (0.136–0.156 in) in males and 3.62–4.43 mm (0.143–0.174 in) in females. The head is black with yellowish-brown antennae. The pronotum, scutellum and elytra are black, the anterior and lateral margins of the pronotum with a brownish-yellow border. Each elytron has two large yellowish-red spots.
