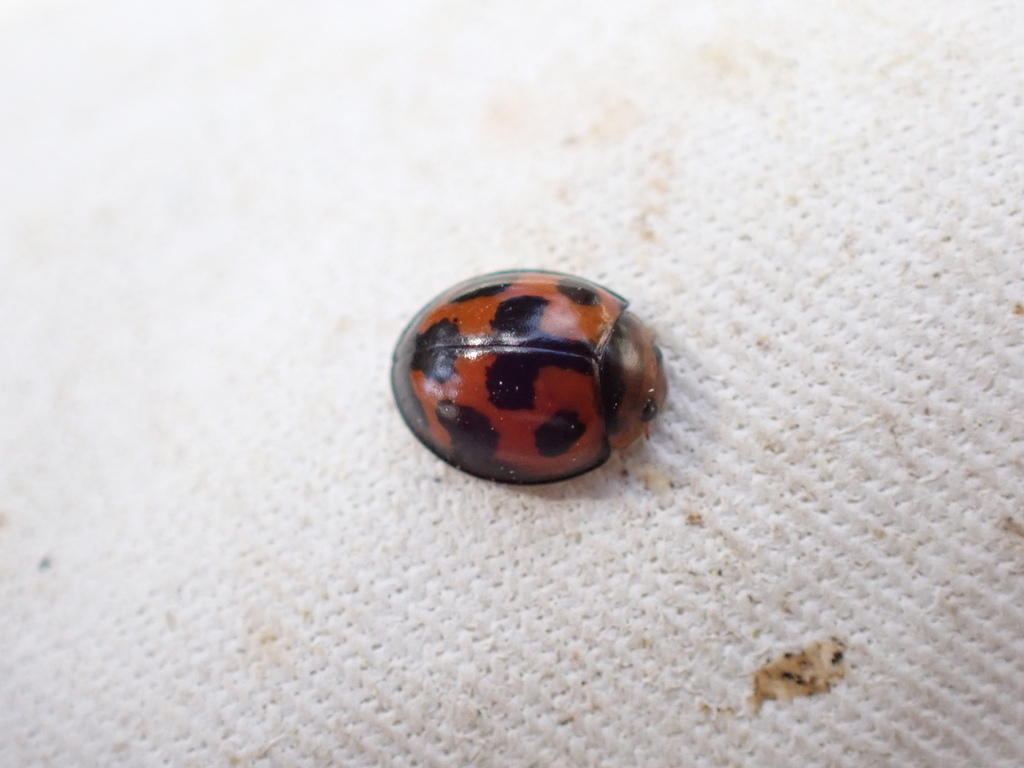

Scientific classification
- Kingdom: Animalia
- Phylum: Arthropoda
- Clade: Pancrustacea
- Class: Insecta
- Order: Coleoptera
- Suborder: Polyphaga
- Infraorder: Cucujiformia
- Family: Coccinellidae
- Genus: Exochomus
- Species: E. ericae

Binomial name
- Exochomus ericae (Crotch, 1874)

Synonyms
- Exochomus quadripustulatus var. ericae Crotch, 1874; Chilocorus nigropictus Fairmaire, 1876; Chilocorus picturatus Fairmaire, 1876; Exochomus quadripustulatus var. anchorifer Bedel, 1885

= Exochomus ericae =

Species of beetle

Exochomus ericae is a species of beetle of the family Coccinellidae. It is found in Morocco, Algeria and Tunisia.

== Description ==
Adults reach a length of about 3.46–3.96 mm (0.136–0.156 in) in males and 3.62–4.43 mm (0.143–0.174 in) in females. The head is black with brownish-yellow antennae. The pronotum of the females is black with brownish-yellow anterior and lateral margins or brownish-yellow with a black spot on the base. The scutellum is black and the elytra are brownish-orange to orange, each with a black border and five black spots.

== Life history ==
They have been recorded preying on Phenacoccus peyerimhoffi, Stozia striata, Gueriniella serratulae and Chionaspis ceratoniae.
