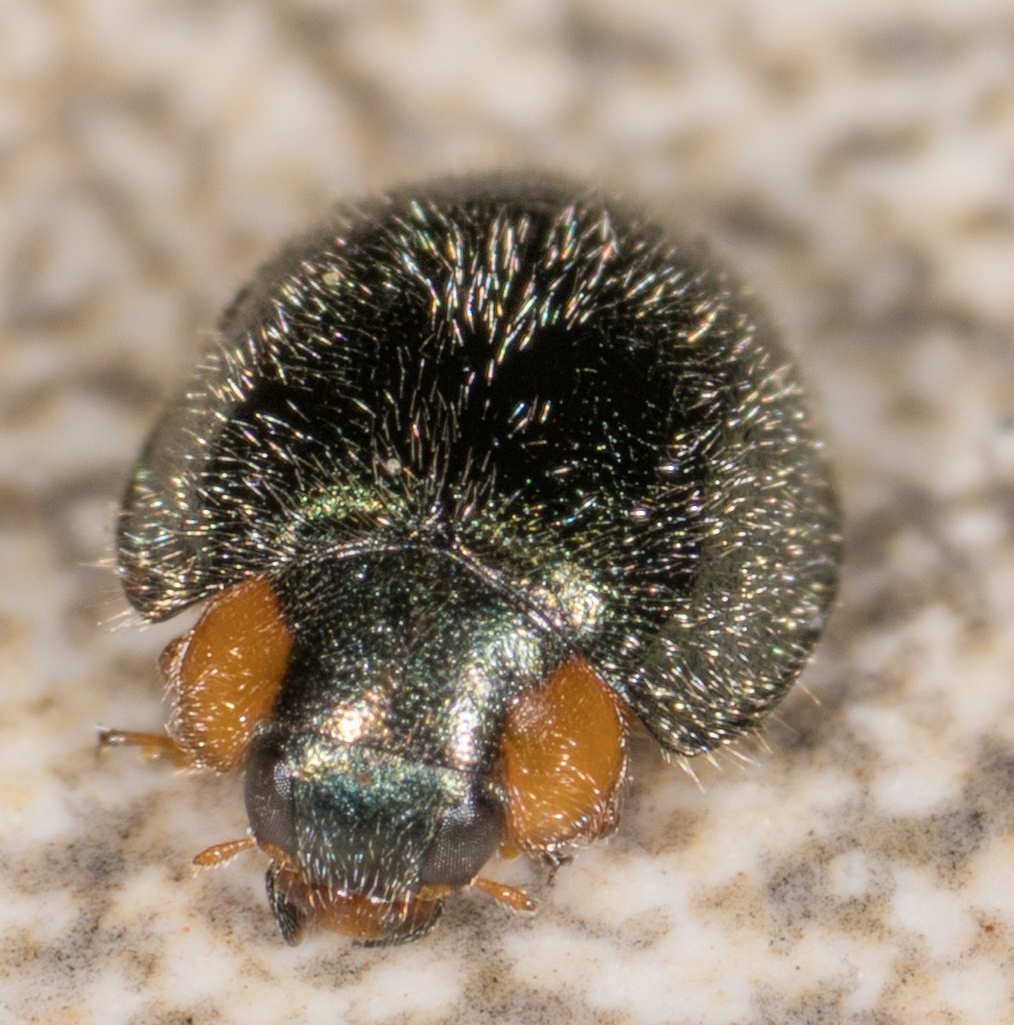

Scientific classification
- Kingdom: Animalia
- Phylum: Arthropoda
- Clade: Pancrustacea
- Class: Insecta
- Order: Coleoptera
- Suborder: Polyphaga
- Infraorder: Cucujiformia
- Family: Coccinellidae
- Genus: Exochomus
- Species: E. metallicus

Binomial name
- Exochomus metallicus Korschefsky, 1935

= Exochomus metallicus =

Species of beetle

Exochomus metallicus is a species of lady beetle in the family Coccinellidae. It is found in Africa and has been introduced to North America, where it has been recorded from California.

== Description ==
Adults reach a length of about 3-4.5 mm. Adults are mostly metallic green, but the lateral one-thord to five-sixth of the pronotum is yellow.
