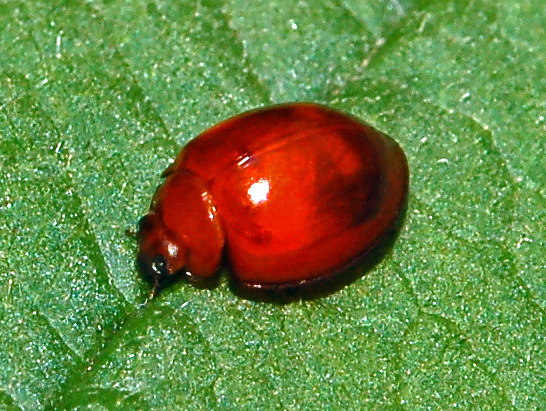
- Adult Exochomus quadripustulatus, reddish form

Scientific classification
- Kingdom: Animalia
- Phylum: Arthropoda
- Clade: Pancrustacea
- Class: Insecta
- Order: Coleoptera
- Suborder: Polyphaga
- Infraorder: Cucujiformia
- Family: Coccinellidae
- Subfamily: Coccinellinae
- Tribe: Chilocorini
- Genus: Exochomus; Redtenbacher, 1843

Synonyms
- Brumus Mulsant, 1850; Anexochomus Barovskij, 1922

= Exochomus =

Genus of beetles

Exochomus is a genus of beetles in the family Coccinellidae.

== Species ==
The following 77 species are recognised in the genus Exochomus:

- Exochomus aethiops (Bland, 1864)
- Exochomus bicolor Fernandez & Milan, 2010
- Exochomus bifasciatus Barovsky, 1927
- Exochomus bipunctiger (Gorham, 1901)
- Exochomus bisbinotatus Gorham, 1894
- Exochomus bolivianus Mader, 1957
- Exochomus bouvieri Sicard, 1912
- Exochomus caeruleotinctus (Sicard, 1907)
- Exochomus californicus (Casey, 1899)
- Exochomus cedri (Sahlberg, 1913)
- Exochomus cherenensis Weise, 1915
- Exochomus childreni (Mulsant, 1850)
- Exochomus cinctivestis Mulsant, 1853
- Exochomus contristatus Mulsant, 1850
- Exochomus corallinus Weise, 1898
- Exochomus dallasi Crotch, 1874
- Exochomus decemnotatus Gordon, 1974
- Exochomus decoloratus Mulsant, 1853
- Exochomus densepubescens Mader, 1941
- Exochomus difficilis Mader, 1954
- Exochomus discors (Barovsky, 1927)
- Exochomus ericae (Crotch, 1874)
- Exochomus famelicus Weise, 1913
- Exochomus fasciatus (Casey, 1899)
- Exochomus flavipes (Thunberg, 1781)
- Exochomus flaviventris Mader, 1954
- Exochomus frater (Weise, 1895)
- Exochomus freyi Mader, 1958
- Exochomus fulvimanus Weise, 1913
- Exochomus fulvipennis Mader, 1954
- Exochomus gebleri (Weise, 1885)
- Exochomus haafi Fürsch, 1961
- Exochomus haemorrhoidalis (Thunberg, 1781)
- Exochomus hospes Weise, 1909
- Exochomus huebneri Weise, 1900
- Exochomus hypomelas Crotch, 1874
- Exochomus insatiabilis (Rodríguez-Vélez, 2018)
- Exochomus ixtlensis Casey, 1924
- Exochomus jacobsoni (Barovsky, 1927)
- Exochomus jamaicensis Sicard, 1922
- Exochomus keiseri Fürsch, 1961
- Exochomus kiritshenkoi Barovsky, 1922
- Exochomus kohlschuetteri Weise, 1906
- Exochomus laeviusculus Weise, 1909
- Exochomus lajoyei Sicard, 1909
- Exochomus lamottei Fürsch, 1963
- Exochomus marginipennis (LeConte, 1824)
- Exochomus metallicus (Korschefsky, 1935)
- Exochomus mongol Barovsky, 1922
- Exochomus mongolicus (Fleischer, 1900)
- Exochomus nigrifrons Gerstaecker, 1871
- Exochomus oaxacus Ukrainsky, 2008
- Exochomus oblongus Weidenbach, 1859
- Exochomus octosignatus (Gebler, 1830)
- Exochomus orbiculus Weise, 1893
- Exochomus pegas Ukrainsky, 2007
- Exochomus personatus Weise, 1895
- Exochomus philippinensis Korschefsky, 1944
- Exochomus plumbeus Sicard, 1909
- Exochomus pretiosus Mader, 1958
- Exochomus promtus Weise, 1913
- Exochomus pulchellus Gerstäcker, 1871
- Exochomus quadriguttatus (Fleischer, 1900)
- Exochomus quadripustulatus (Linnaeus, 1758)
- Exochomus rubistictus Li & Ren, 2016
- Exochomus rubropictus Sicard, 1930
- Exochomus sallaei Gorham, 1894
- Exochomus scheini Fürsch, 1960
- Exochomus septemmaculatus (Weise, 1885)
- Exochomus splendens Sicard, 1909
- Exochomus subrotundus (Casey, 1899)
- Exochomus tellinii Weise, 1905
- Exochomus townsendi (Casey, 1908)
- Exochomus trivittatoides (Mader, 1957)
- Exochomus undulatus Weise, 1879
- Exochomus ventralis Gerstäcker, 1871
- Exochomus viridipennis Weise, 1909
