= Exochomus gebleri =

Scientific classification
- Kingdom: Animalia
- Phylum: Arthropoda
- Clade: Pancrustacea
- Class: Insecta
- Order: Coleoptera
- Suborder: Polyphaga
- Infraorder: Cucujiformia
- Family: Coccinellidae
- Genus: Exochomus
- Species: E. gebleri

Binomial name
- Exochomus gebleri (Weise, 1885)

Synonyms
- Brumus octosignatus var. gebleri Weise, 1885; Brumus gebleri

Species of beetle

Exochomus gebleri is a species of beetle of the family Coccinellidae. It is found in Turkey, Iran and possibly Afghanistan.

== Description ==
Adults reach a length of about 4.06–4.96 mm (0.160–0.195 in) in males and 4.04–4.8 mm (0.159–0.189 in) in females. The head is black with a yellowish transparent spot and yellowish-brown antennae. The pronotum is black with the anterior and lateral margins and a spot on the anterior corners yellowish-red. The scutellum is yellowish-red or black and the elytra are yellowish-red with a black lateral margin and each elytron with four black spots.
