= Anna Atkins =

British photographer (1799–1871)

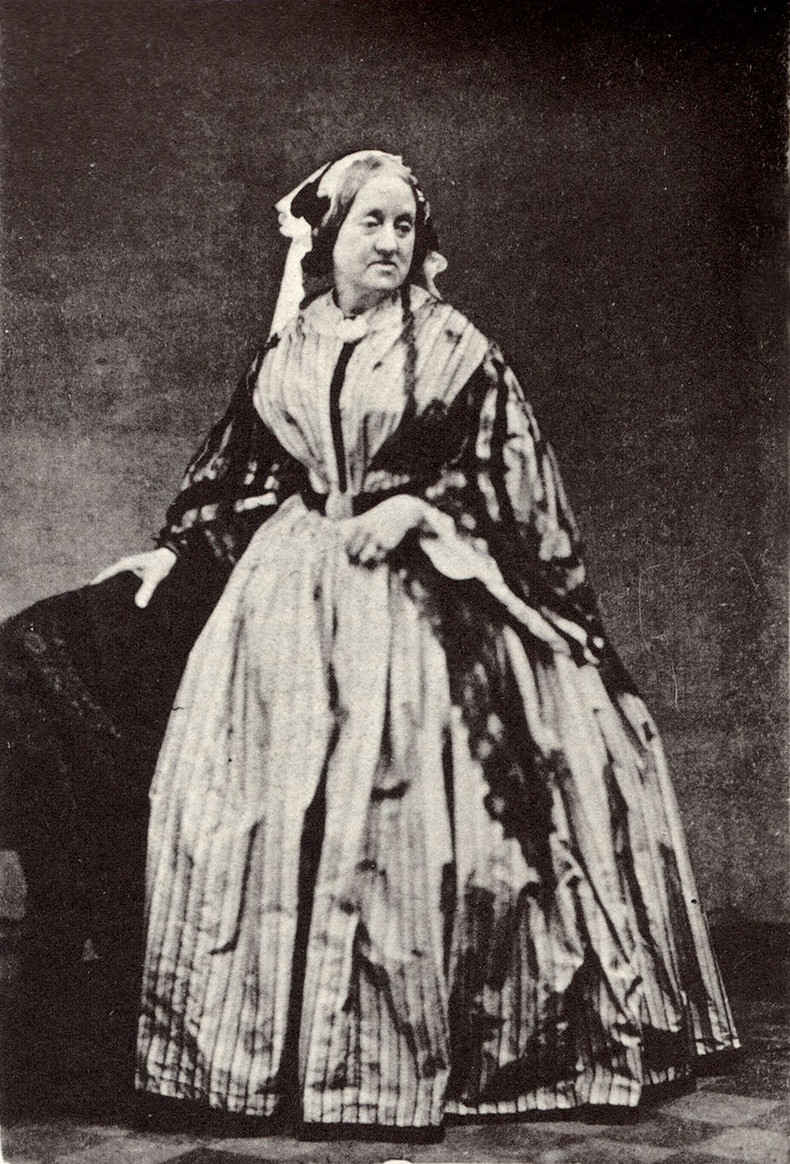
- Atkins in 1861
- Born: 16 March 1799; Tonbridge, Kent, England
- Died: 9 June 1871 (aged 72); Halstead Place, Sevenoaks, Kent, England
- Known for: Very early botanical photographs, 1843 book Photographs of British Algae: Cyanotype Impressions (1st book illustrated with photographic images)
- Spouse: John Pelly Atkins (m. 1825)
- Scientific career
- Fields: Botany; photography

Anna Atkins (née Children; 16 March 1799 – 9 June 1871) was an English botanist and photographer. She is often considered the first person to publish a book illustrated with photographic images. Some sources say that she was the first woman to create a photograph.

== Early life ==
Atkins was born in Tonbridge, Kent, England in 1799. Her mother, Hester Anne Children, "didn't recover from the effects of childbirth" and died in 1800. Anna was close to her father John George Children, a renowned chemist, mineralogist, and zoologist. Anna "received an unusually scientific education for a woman of her time." Her detailed engravings of shells were used to illustrate her father's translation of Lamarck's Genera of Shells.

In 1825, she married John Pelly Atkins, a London West India merchant, later Sheriff of Kent, and proponent of railways; during this same year, she moved to Halstead Place, the Atkins family home in Halstead, near Sevenoaks, Kent. They had no children. Atkins pursued her interests in botany by collecting dried plants, which were probably used as photograms later. She was elected a member of the London Botanical Society in 1839.

== Photography ==
John George Children and John Pelly Atkins were friends of William Henry Fox Talbot. Anna Atkins learned directly from Talbot about two of his inventions related to photography: the "photogenic drawing" technique (in which an object is placed on light-sensitized paper and exposed to the sun to produce an image) and calotypes.

Atkins was known to have had access to a camera by 1841. Some sources say that Atkins was the first female photographer, while others attribute this title to Constance Fox Talbot. As no camera-based photographs by Anna Atkins, nor photographs by Constance Talbot, survive, the issue may never be resolved.

== Photographs of British Algae: Cyanotype Impressions ==
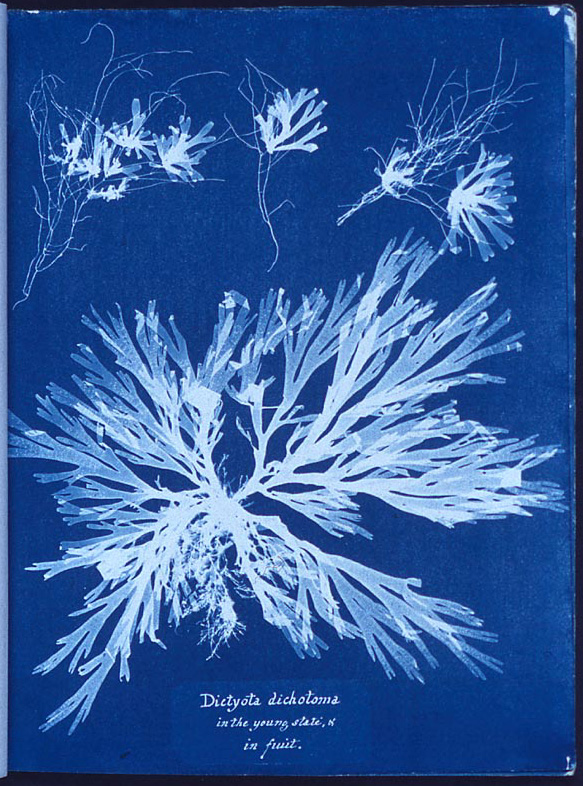
A cyanotype photogram made by Atkins which was part of her 1843 book, Photographs of British Algae: Cyanotype Impressions

Sir John Herschel, a friend of Atkins and Children, invented the cyanotype photographic process in 1842. Within a year, Atkins applied the process to algae (specifically, seaweed) by making cyanotype photograms that were contact printed "by placing the unmounted dried-algae original directly on the cyanotype paper".

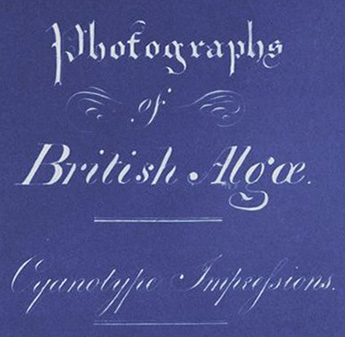
Detail of title page of Photographs of British Algae: Cyanotype Impressions

Atkins self-published her photograms in the first installment of Photographs of British Algae: Cyanotype Impressions in October 1843. She planned to provide illustrations to William Henry Harvey's A Manual of British Algae which had been published in 1841. Although privately published, with a limited number of copies, and with handwritten text, Photographs of British Algae: Cyanotype Impressions is considered the first book illustrated with photographic images.

Eight months later, in June 1844, the first fascicle of William Henry Fox Talbot's The Pencil of Nature was released; that book was the "first photographically illustrated book to be commercially published" or "the first commercially published book illustrated with photographs".

Atkins produced a total of three volumes of Photographs of British Algae: Cyanotype Impressions between 1843 and 1853. Only 17 copies of the book are known to exist, in various states of completeness. Copies are now held by the following institutions, among others:

- British Library, London, which provides scans of 429 pages of its copy (which has extra plates) online. She presented these volumes to the British Museum via J. E. Gray between 1843 and 1853.
- Kelvingrove Art Gallery and Museum, Glasgow, Scotland.
- Metropolitan Museum of Art, New York.
- New York Public Library, which provides scans of 285 pages of its copy online.
- The Royal Society, London, whose copy with 403 pages and 389 plates is thought to be the only existing copy of the book as Atkins intended. There are 403 pages available online; the digitized images do not include text or title pages, only plates.
- The Natural History Museum in London. They have digitized and uploaded 424 pages from all three volumes.
- The Linnean Society of London, described as "3 volumes, [162, 152, 99] plates", and whose copy lacks part 7 of volume 1.
- The Horniman Museum and Gardens holds a particularly complete copy with 14 pages of text and 443 plates. She provided plates with additional images of the same species when she found a better example, and these duplicates have been retained in this copy.
- Rijksmuseum, Amsterdam.
- Université de Montréal, Montreal. This copy appears to have been in the possession of Herschel. The three volumes were bound into one, with all contents lists, appendix list, and errata list at the front. It is 463 images including a later note from the time of the binding.

One copy of the book with 411 plates in three volumes sold for £133,500 at auction in 1996. Another copy with 382 prints in two volumes which was owned by scientist Robert Hunt (1807–1887) sold for £229,250 at auction in 2004.

In 2018, the New York Public Library opened an exhibition on Atkins' life and work, featuring various versions of Photographs of British Algae.

== Later life and work ==
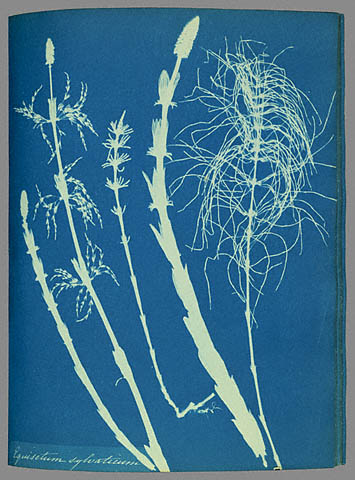
Cyanotype photogram of Wood Horsetail from the 1853 book Cyanotypes of British and Foreign Ferns by Atkins and Dixon

She has also been credited with writing some anonymous novels, but this has now been disproved.

In the 1850s, Atkins collaborated with Anne Dixon (1799–1864), who was "like a sister" to her, to produce at least three presentation albums of cyanotype photograms:

- Cyanotypes of British and Foreign Ferns (1853), now in the J. Paul Getty Museum;
- Cyanotypes of British and Foreign Flowering Plants and Ferns (1854), disassembled pages of which are held by various museums and collectors;
- An album known only as "Cyanotypes", inscribed to "Captain Henry Dixon," Anne Dixon's nephew (1861), "containing 74 original cyanotypes of botanical, feather, and textile specimens. Images depict algae, ferns, flowers, seaweed, and other plants; feathers from birds such as the peacock, emu, partridge, and duck; and needlework. The majority of the photographs include handwritten captions reproduced by cyanotype that identify plants by their Latin name or location, feathers by the English name of the bird, groups of specimens by the type of material depicted, and other descriptors. Locations outside of Britain mentioned in captions include Ceylon, South America, and Jamaica." It is currently in the collection of the Beinecke at Yale, and has been fully digitized.

The Victoria and Albert Museum, London, holds a number of original works in their library - large plates not from Photographs of British Algae.

Atkins retained the algae, ferns and other plants that she used in her work and in 1865 donated the collection to the British Museum.

She died at Halstead Place in 1871 of "paralysis, rheumatism, and exhaustion" at the age of 72.

== In popular culture ==
On 16 March 2015, Internet search engine Google commemorated Atkins's 216th birthday by placing a Google Doodle image of bluish leaf shapes on a darker background on its search page to represent her cyanoprint work.

Atkins' work was a major feature in the New Realities Photography in the Nineteenth Century exhibition held in the Rijksmuseum, Amsterdam, June – September 2017.

Poet Jessy Randall included a tribute to Atkins in her 2025 collection of poems about women scientists, The Path of Most Resistance.

== Publications ==
- Atkins, Anna (2020) [1843]. Photographs of British Algae: Cyanotype Impressions (Sir John Herschel's Copy). Gerhard Steidl Druckerei und Verlag. ISBN 978-3-95829-510-0.
- Atkins, Anna (1853). Memoir of J. C. Children, including some unpublished poetry by his father and himself. London: John Bowye Nichols and Sons. OCLC 54191950, 556415937.

== See also ==
- Timeline of women in science
