= Archer James Oliver =

British painter

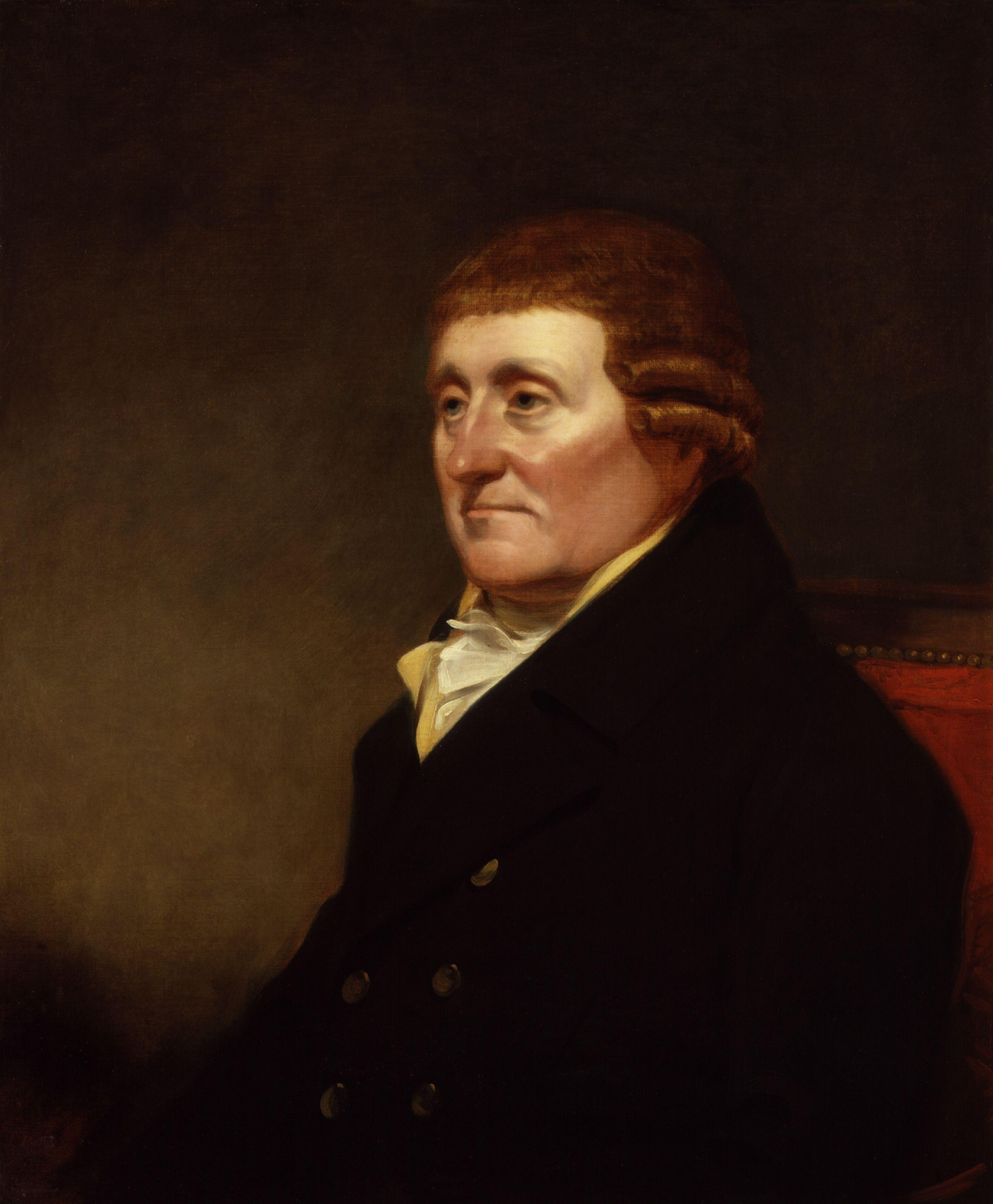
Portrait of George Children by Archer James Oliver

Archer James Oliver ARA (1774 – 16 March 1842) was a British painter, principally active as a portraitist.

== Life ==
The son of John and Anna Maria Oliver, he was christened at St Mary's church in Whitechapel on 3 October 1774. Oliver studied at the Royal Academy from 13 August 1790. He exhibited 210 paintings at the Royal Academy between 1791 and 1841, and 62 at the British Institution. In the latter part of his career he showed still lifes of fruit, nuts and dead game, and some biblical scenes, in addition to the portraits which had previously predominated.

His portraits were often engraved. Their subjects included the banker George Children; the politician Sir Berkeley Guise, 2nd Baronet; the songwriter Charles Morris; Robert Morris; the minister Vicesimus Knox; and the solicitor Robert Blake. In 1803-4 he exhibited some portraits of members of the Howard family in medieval costume, intended as designs for stained glass at Arundel Castle.

He was elected an Associate of the Royal Academy on 2 November 1807.

== Sources ==
- This article incorporates text from a publication now in the public domain: Lee, Sidney, ed. (1895). "Oliver, Archer James". Dictionary of National Biography. Vol. 42. London: Smith, Elder & Co.
