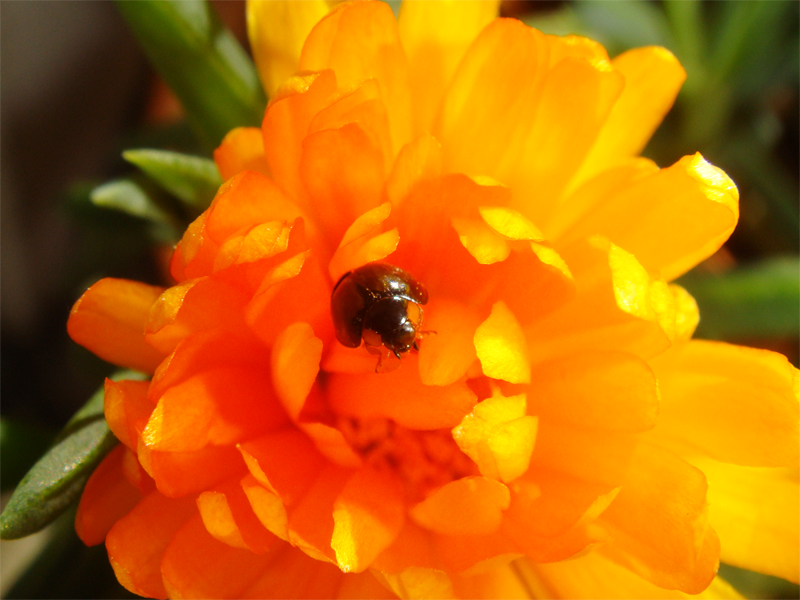

Scientific classification
- Kingdom: Animalia
- Phylum: Arthropoda
- Clade: Pancrustacea
- Class: Insecta
- Order: Coleoptera
- Suborder: Polyphaga
- Infraorder: Cucujiformia
- Family: Coccinellidae
- Genus: Exochomus
- Species: E. flavipes

Binomial name
- Exochomus flavipes (Thunberg, 1781)

Synonyms
- Coccinella flavipes Thunberg, 1781

= Exochomus flavipes =

Species of beetle

Exochomus flavipes is a species of beetle in the family Coccinellidae. It naturally occurs in Africa and the Palearctic Region, but has also been introduced to North America, where it is now found in the San Francisco Bay area of California.

== Description ==
Adults reach a length of about 3-4 mm. Adults are mostly black, but the lateral one-third of the pronotum, propleuron, legs and most of the abdomen are yellow.
