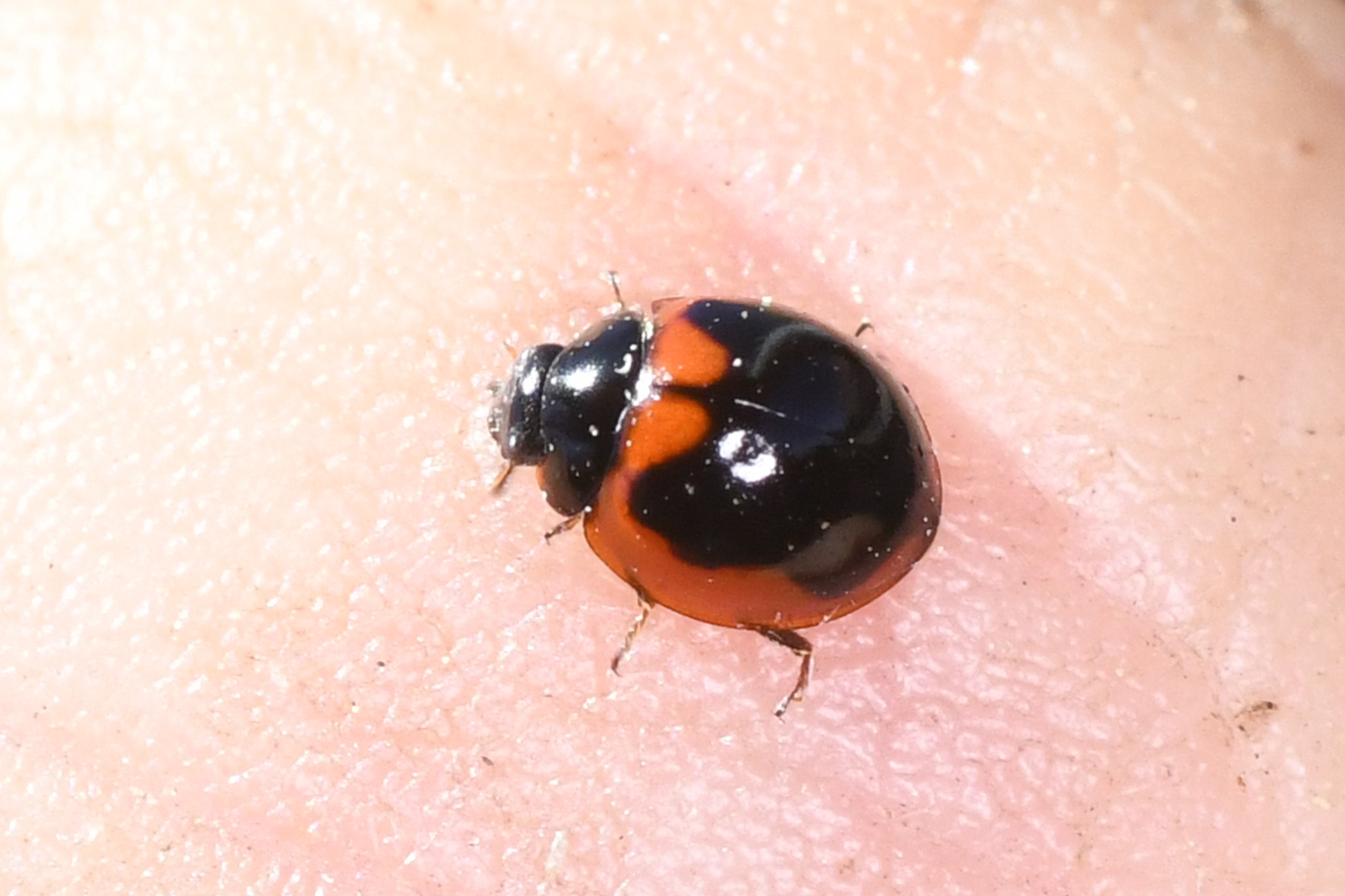

Scientific classification
- Kingdom: Animalia
- Phylum: Arthropoda
- Clade: Pancrustacea
- Class: Insecta
- Order: Coleoptera
- Suborder: Polyphaga
- Infraorder: Cucujiformia
- Family: Coccinellidae
- Genus: Exochomus
- Species: E. subrotundus

Binomial name
- Exochomus subrotundus Casey, 1899

= Exochomus subrotundus =

Species of beetle

Exochomus subrotundus is a species of lady beetle in the family Coccinellidae. It is found in North America, where it has been recorded from California, Arizona and Texas.

== Description ==
Adults reach a length of about 2.70-3.40 mm. Adults have a black head and pronotum, sometimes with a yellow anterolateral angle. The elytron is dark brown or black with a yellow or orange lateral border and basal spot.
