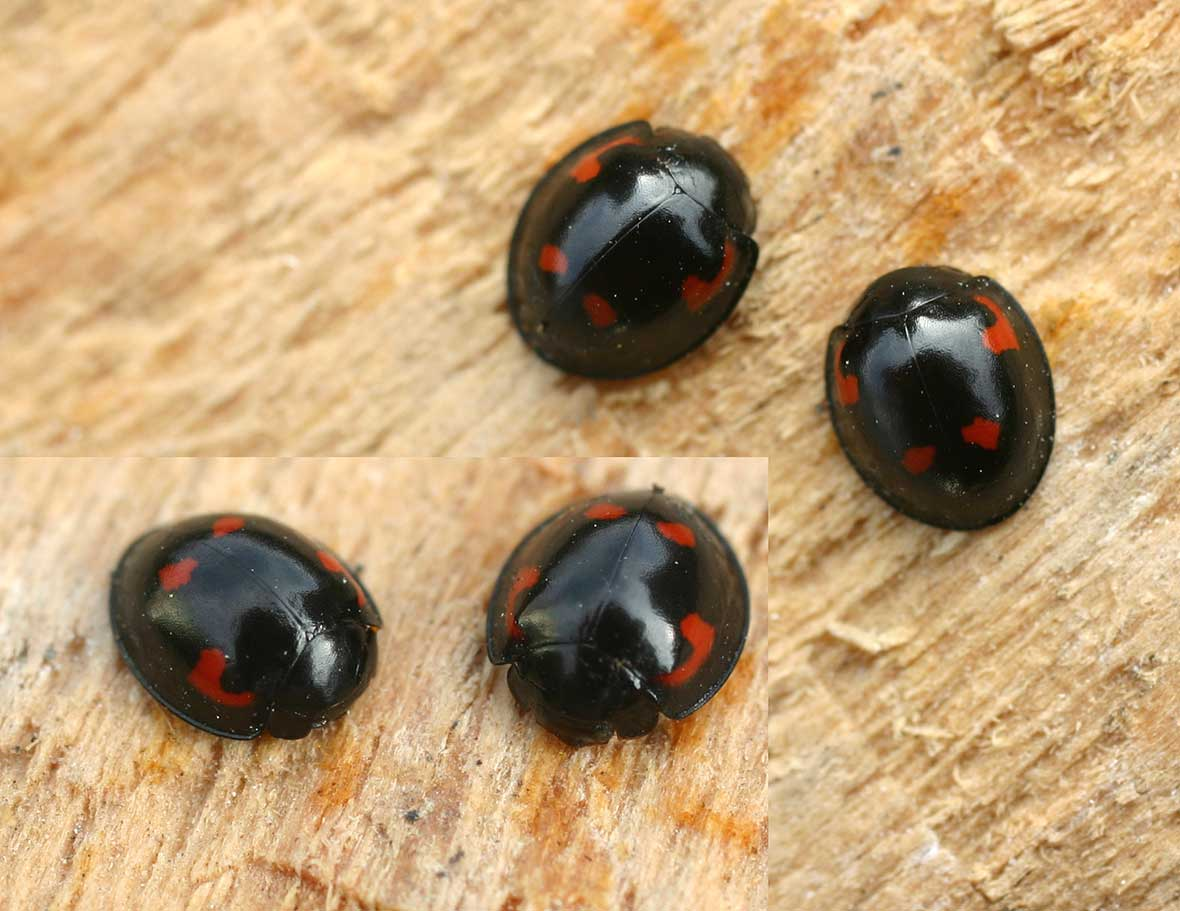
- Adult Exochomus quadripustulatus

Conservation status
- Secure (NatureServe)

Scientific classification
- Kingdom: Animalia
- Phylum: Arthropoda
- Clade: Pancrustacea
- Class: Insecta
- Order: Coleoptera
- Suborder: Polyphaga
- Infraorder: Cucujiformia
- Family: Coccinellidae
- Genus: Exochomus
- Species: E. quadripustulatus

Binomial name
- Exochomus quadripustulatus (Linnaeus, 1758)

Synonyms
- Coccinella quadripustulata Linnaeus, 1758; Brumus quadripustulatus; Exochomus quadripustulatus var. bilunulatus Weise, 1879; Exochomus quadripustulatus var. koltzei Weise, 1879; Exochomus quadripustulatus var. reitteri Schneider, 1881; Exochomus quadripustulatus var. sexpustulatus Kraatz, 1873; Exochomus quadripustulatus var. vittatus Fuente, 1910; Coccinella lunulata Gmelin, 1790; Coccinella quadriverrucata Fabricius, 1792; Coccinella cassidoides Donovan, 1798; Coccinella distincta Brullé, 1832; Coccinella floralis Motschulsky, 1837; Coccinella iberica Motschulsky, 1837

= Exochomus quadripustulatus =

Species of beetle

Exochomus quadripustulatus, commonly known as the pine ladybird or pine lady beetle, is a species of beetle of the family Coccinellidae.

== Description ==
Exochomus quadripustulatus can reach a length of about 4-6 millimeters. It is almost circular, convex and shining, with a flange around the base. The color is quite variable and may change with age. Usually the elytra are black with two larger red comma-shaped spots and two smaller round red spots. The color of these spots can also be orange or yellow, but completely reddish brown specimens may occur.

== Distribution and habitat ==
This species is present in most of Europe, in the eastern Palearctic, and in the Near East. It was first recorded in Ireland (County Armagh) in 2014. It was introduced to San Francisco between 1915 and 1930 to control the hemlock woolly adelgid, and has since spread across the west coast of North America from California to British Columbia. It is also present in Massachusetts.

This fairly common ladybug can be found from April to October especially on conifers and in areas with deciduous trees.

== Ecology and biological control ==
The pine ladybird in both adult and larval stages preys on aphids and scale insects, especially Diaspidiotus perniciosus. Adults overwinter.

E. quadripustulatus has strong potential as a biological control in Italy by being a candidate predator of Toumeyella parvicornis, an alien pest that infests stone pines; it has been observed to be more attracted to conspecific and heterospecific ladybugs than Cryptolaemus montrouzieri, another candidate predator, and responds to prey more quickly.

== Gallery ==
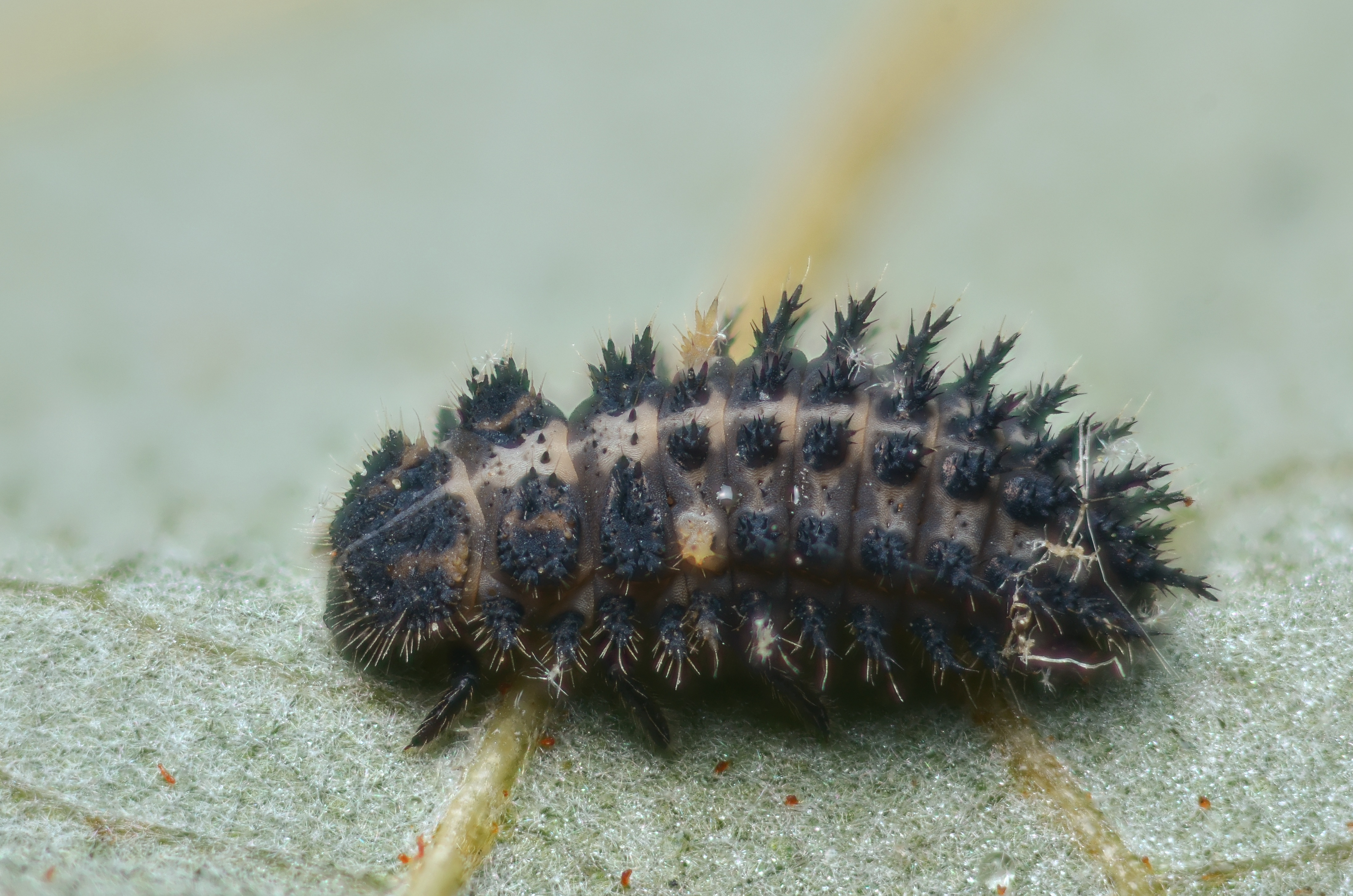
Larva

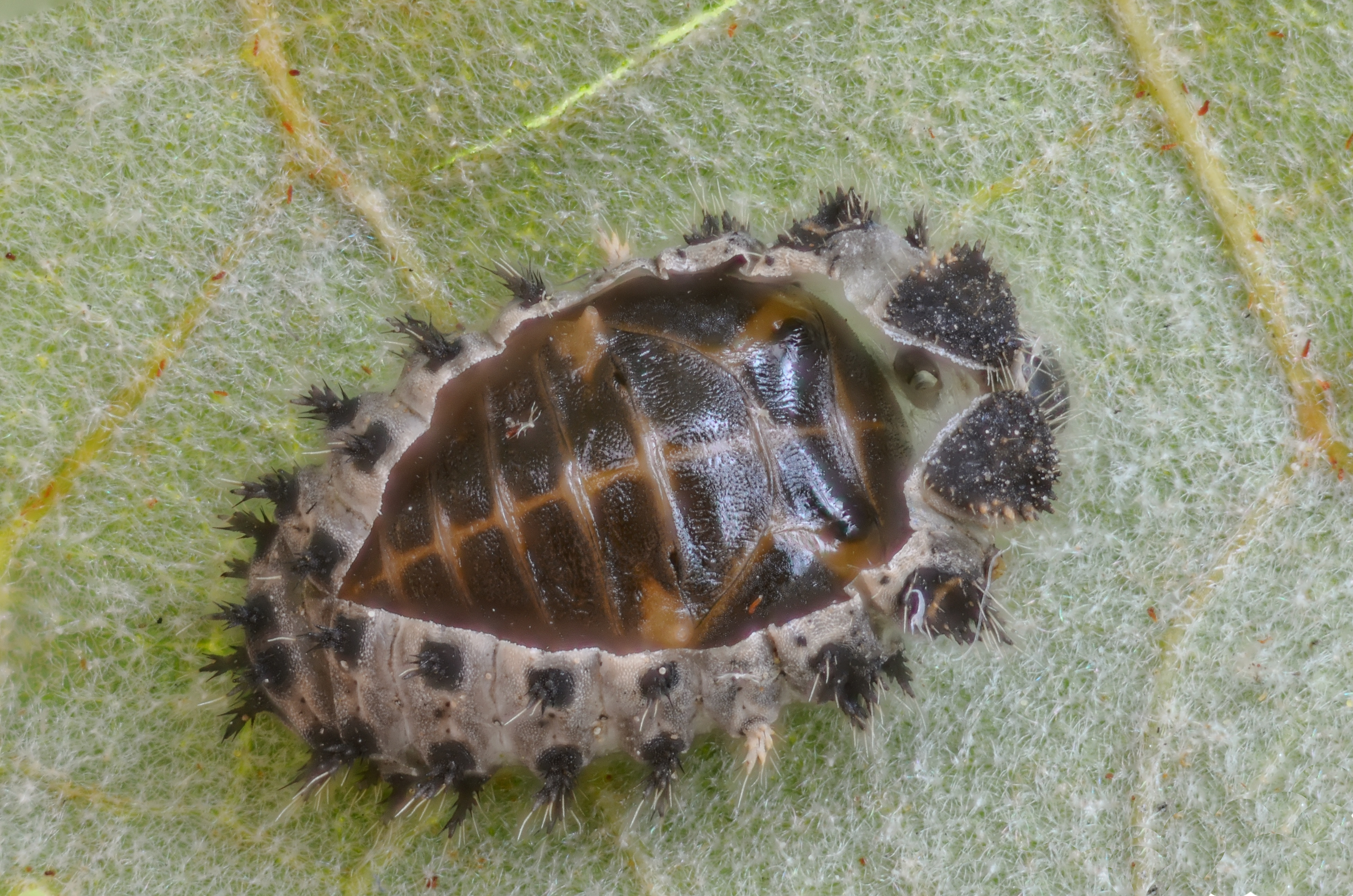
Pupa

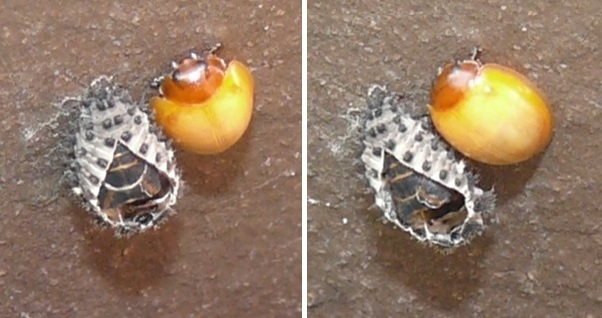
Newly emerged adult

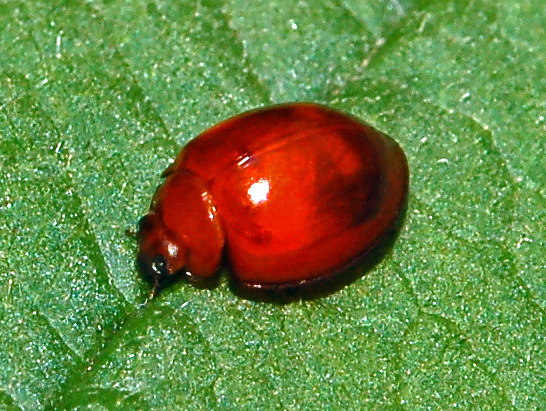
Adult, reddish form

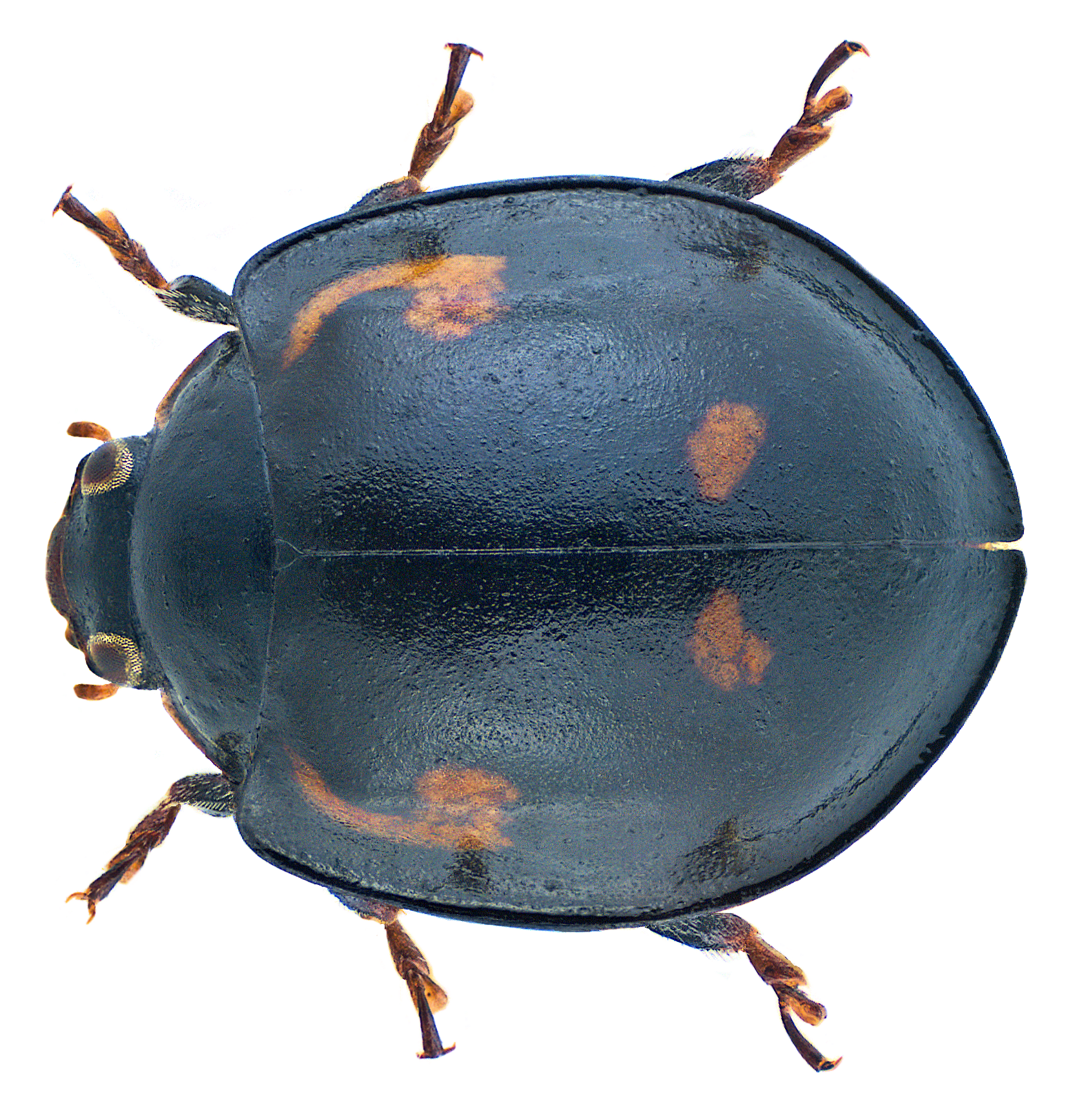

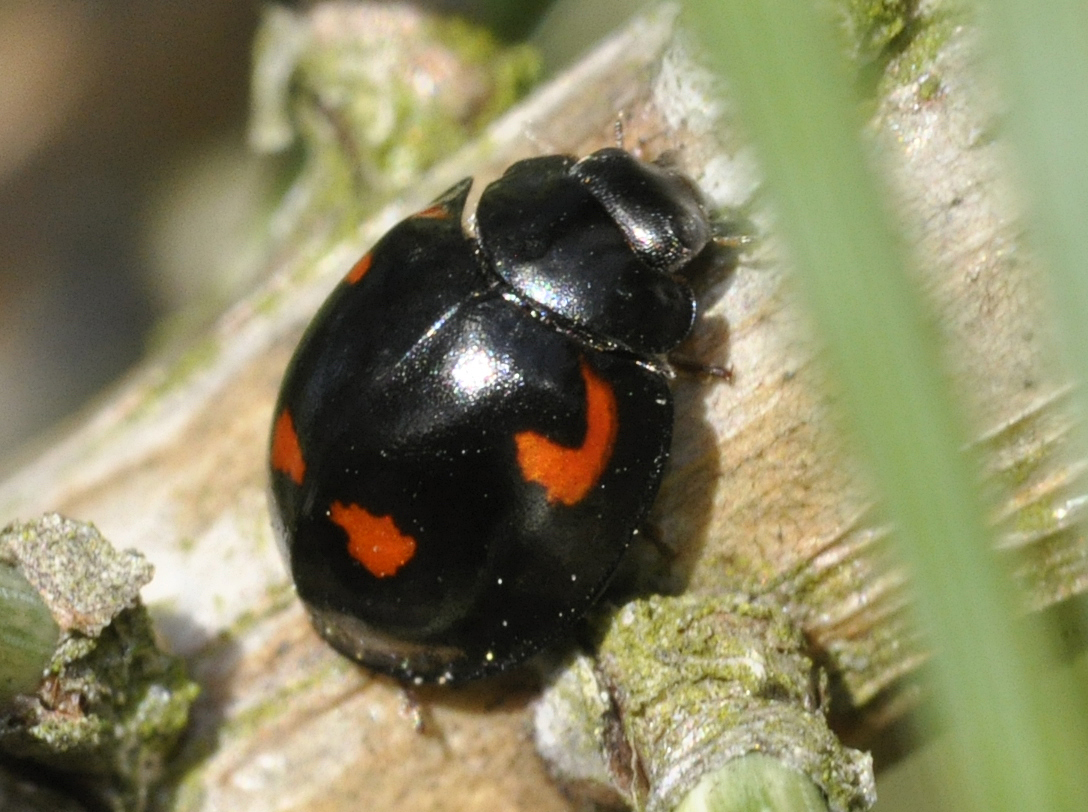
