= Exochomus mongolicus =

Scientific classification
- Kingdom: Animalia
- Phylum: Arthropoda
- Clade: Pancrustacea
- Class: Insecta
- Order: Coleoptera
- Suborder: Polyphaga
- Infraorder: Cucujiformia
- Family: Coccinellidae
- Genus: Exochomus
- Species: E. mongolicus

Binomial name
- Exochomus mongolicus (Fleischer, 1900)

Synonyms
- Brumus mongolicus Brumus mongolicus

Species of beetle

Exochomus mongolicus is a species of beetle of the family Coccinellidae. It is found in Mongolia, Russia (eastern Sibiria, Tuva) and south-eastern Kazakhstan.

== Description ==
Adults reach a length of about 2.5–3.5 mm (0.098–0.138 in). The head is black with brownish-yellow antennae. The pronotum is brownish-yellow with a black spot and the scutellum is black. The elytra are brownish-yellow to reddish-orange, each with four black spots.

== Life history ==
They have been recorded preying on aphids and eggs of Mycetophilidae species.
