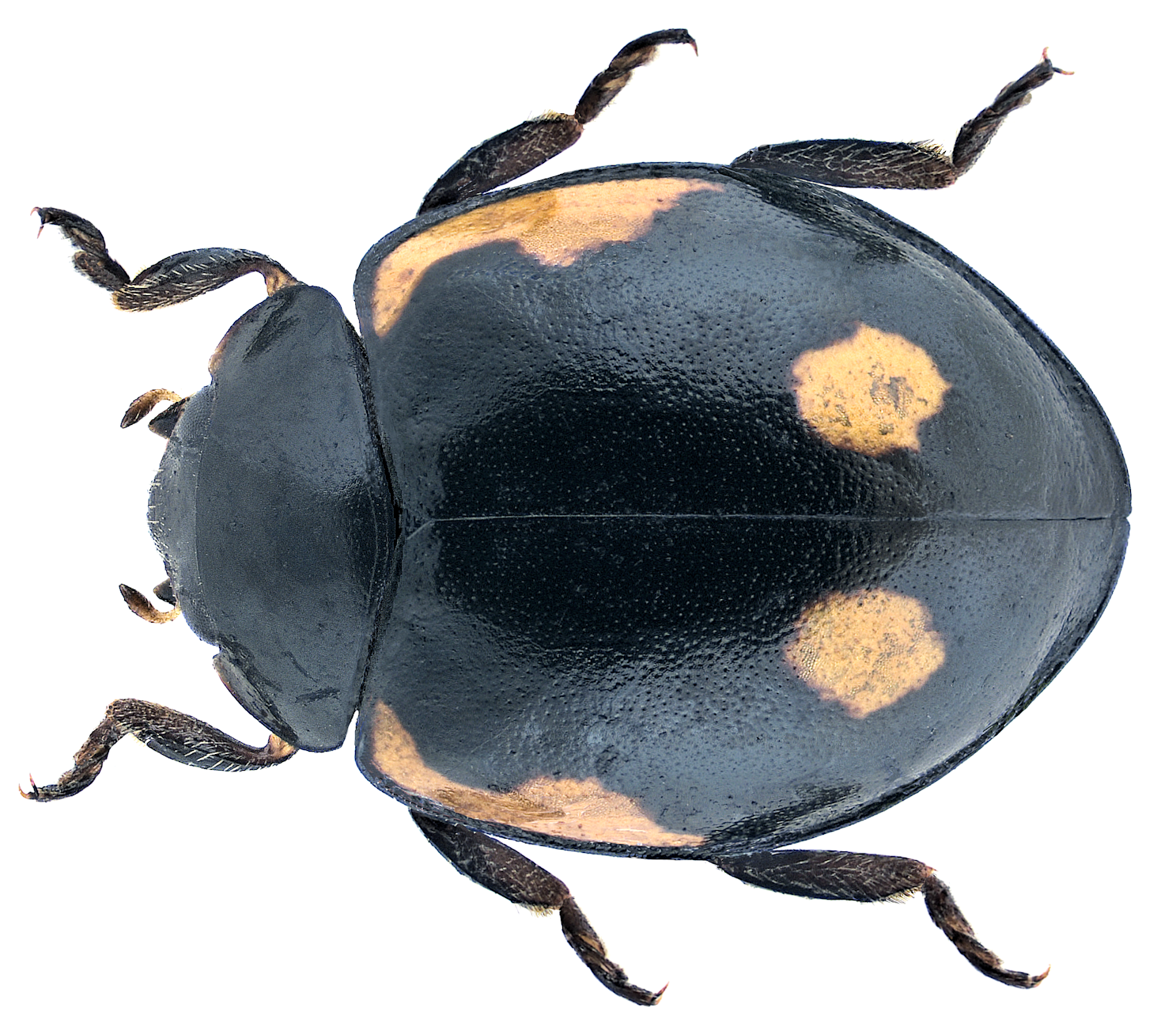

Scientific classification
- Kingdom: Animalia
- Phylum: Arthropoda
- Clade: Pancrustacea
- Class: Insecta
- Order: Coleoptera
- Suborder: Polyphaga
- Infraorder: Cucujiformia
- Family: Coccinellidae
- Genus: Exochomus
- Species: E. oblongus

Binomial name
- Exochomus oblongus Weidenbach, 1859

Synonyms
- Brumus oblongus

= Exochomus oblongus =

Species of beetle

Exochomus oblongus is a species of beetle of the family Coccinellidae. It is found in the eastern Alps.

== Description ==
Adults reach a length of about 3.10–3.59 mm (0.122–0.141 in) in males and 3.35–3.95 mm (0.132–0.156 in) in females. The head is black with a brown to orange transparent spot and with yellowish-brown antennae. The pronotum, scutellum, elytra and underside are black. There are two orange spots on each elytron.

== Life history ==
They probably prey on aphids.
