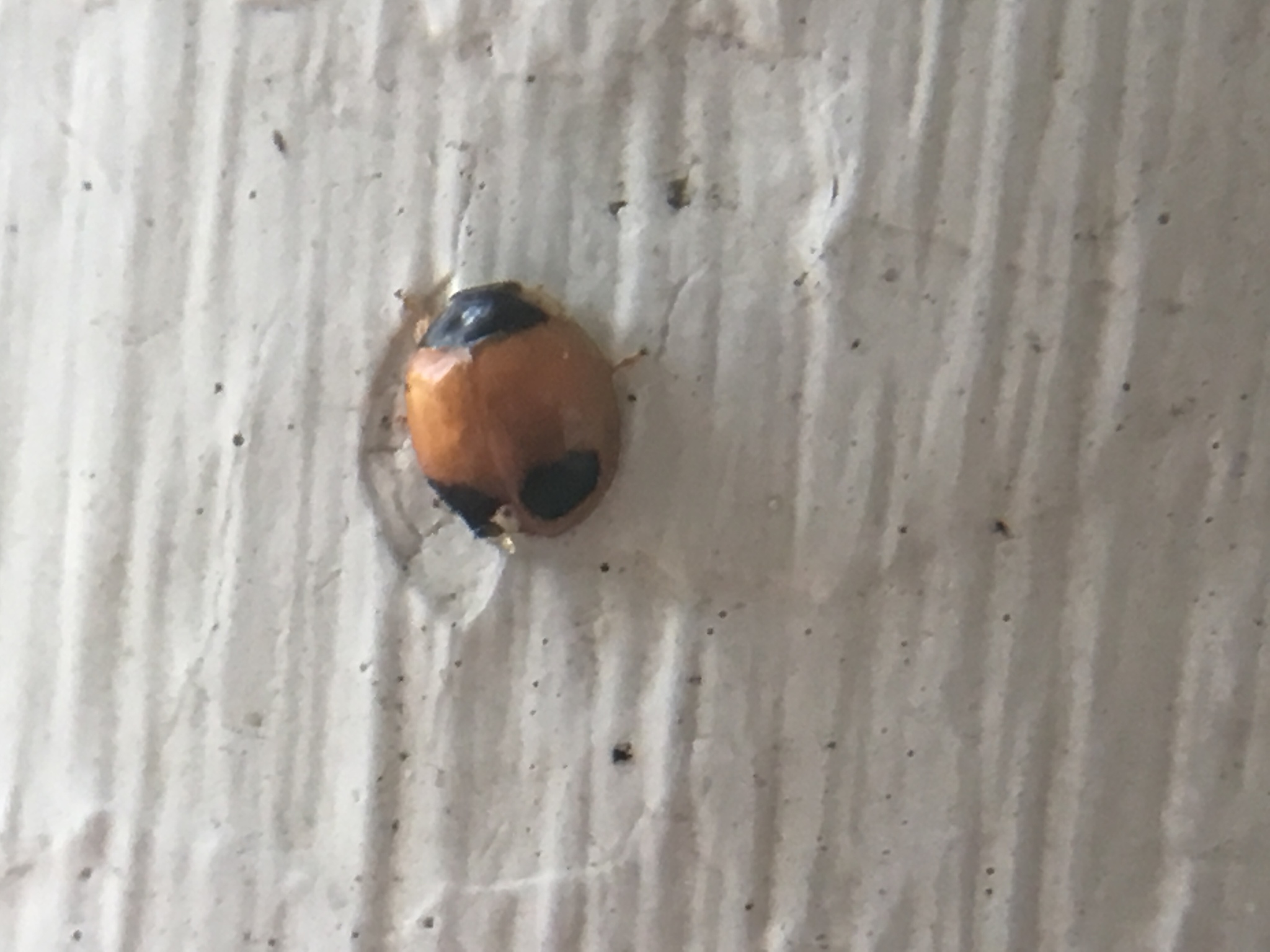

Scientific classification
- Kingdom: Animalia
- Phylum: Arthropoda
- Clade: Pancrustacea
- Class: Insecta
- Order: Coleoptera
- Suborder: Polyphaga
- Infraorder: Cucujiformia
- Family: Coccinellidae
- Genus: Exochomus
- Species: E. marginipennis

Binomial name
- Exochomus marginipennis (LeConte, 1824)

Synonyms
- Coccinella marginipennis LeConte, 1824; Exochomus praetextatus Melsheimer, 1847; Exochomus latiusculus deflectens Casey, 1908

= Exochomus marginipennis =

Species of beetle

Exochomus marginipennis is a species of lady beetle in the family Coccinellidae. It is found in North America, where it has been recorded from New York to Florida, west to Kansas and eastern Texas.

== Description ==
Adults reach a length of about 2.50-3.60 mm. The anterolateral angle of the pronotum and legs of the males are yellow, while the females have the anterolateral angle of the pronotum black or slightly pale. They have dark legs. The elytron is reddish yellow with black spots.
