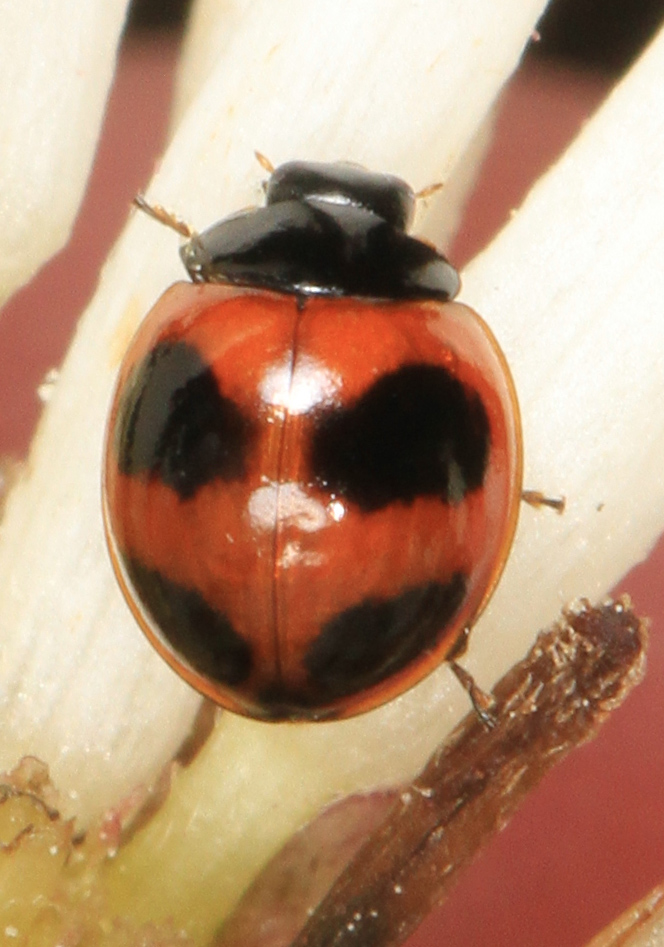
- E. childreni childreni

Scientific classification
- Kingdom: Animalia
- Phylum: Arthropoda
- Clade: Pancrustacea
- Class: Insecta
- Order: Coleoptera
- Suborder: Polyphaga
- Infraorder: Cucujiformia
- Family: Coccinellidae
- Genus: Exochomus
- Species: E. childreni

Binomial name
- Exochomus childreni Mulsant, 1850

Synonyms
- Exochomus guexi LeConte, 1852; Exochomus latiusculus Casey, 1899

= Exochomus childreni =

Species of beetle

Exochomus childreni is a species of lady beetle in the family Coccinellidae. It is found in North America, where it has been recorded from Florida to Louisiana and southern Texas. The species is named after John George Children

== Description ==
Adults reach a length of about 2.80-3.60 mm. The pronotum and head are black and the elytron is yellowish red with a black subapical spot.

== Subspecies ==
These two subspecies belong to the species Exochomus childreni:

- Exochomus childreni childreni Mulsant, 1850 (Florida)
- Exochomus childreni guexi LeConte, 1852 (Louisiana, southern Texas)
