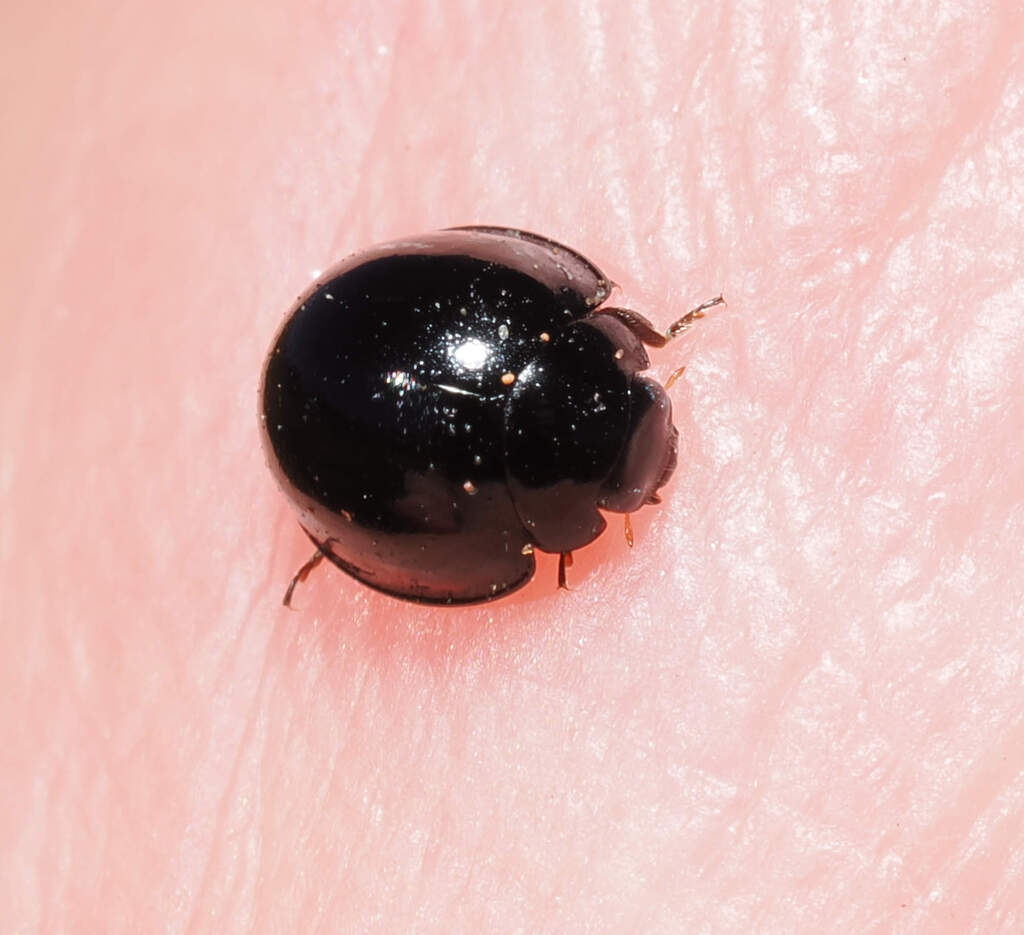

Scientific classification
- Kingdom: Animalia
- Phylum: Arthropoda
- Clade: Pancrustacea
- Class: Insecta
- Order: Coleoptera
- Suborder: Polyphaga
- Infraorder: Cucujiformia
- Family: Coccinellidae
- Genus: Exochomus
- Species: E. aethiops

Binomial name
- Exochomus aethiops (Bland, 1864)

Synonyms
- Coccinella aethiops Bland, 1864; Exochomus mormonicus Casey, 1908

= Exochomus aethiops =

Species of beetle

Exochomus aethiops, the round black ladybug or ebony shield lady beetle, is a species of lady beetle in the family Coccinellidae. It is found in Central America and North America, where it has been recorded from South Dakota to New Mexico, west to Alberta and southern California.

== Description ==
Adults reach a length of about 3-4.2 mm. Adults are black with yellowish brown antennae and mouthparts.
