= Dymaxion house =

Prototype house designed by Buckminster Fuller

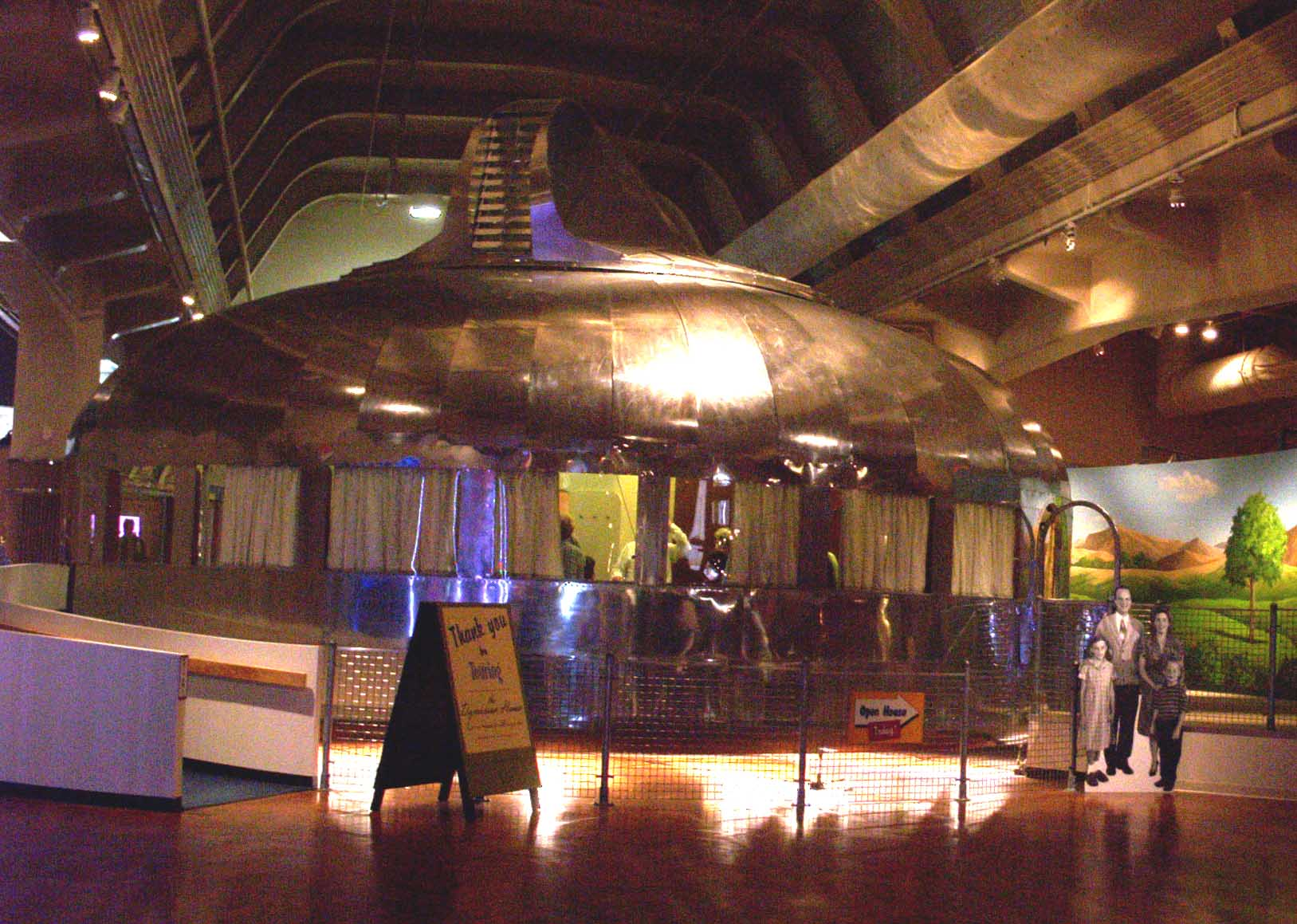
Dymaxion house as installed in the Henry Ford Museum

The Dymaxion house was developed by inventor and architect Buckminster Fuller to address several perceived shortcomings with existing homebuilding techniques. Fuller designed several versions of the house at different times—all of them factory manufactured kits, assembled on site, intended to be suitable for any site or environment and to use resources efficiently. A key design consideration was ease of shipment and assembly.

As he did when naming many of his inventions, Fuller combined the words dynamic, maximum, and tension to arrive at the term Dymaxion.

== History ==
The Dymaxion house was completed in 1930 after two years of development, and redesigned in 1945. Buckminster Fuller wanted to mass-produce a bathroom and a house. His first "Dymaxion" design was based on the design of a grain bin. During World War II, the U.S. Army commissioned Fuller to send these housing units to the Persian Gulf. In 1945, science-fiction writer Robert A. Heinlein placed an order for one to be delivered to Los Angeles, but the order was never filled.

The Siberian grain-silo house was the first system in which Fuller noted the "urban dust dome" effect: many installations have reported that a dome induces a local vertical heat-driven vortex that sucks cooler air downward into a dome, if the dome is vented properly—a single overhead vent, and peripheral vents. Fuller adapted the later units of the grain-silo house to use this effect.

The final design of the Dymaxion house used a central vertical stainless-steel strut on a single foundation. Structures similar to the spokes of a bicycle-wheel hung down from this supporting the roof, while beams radiating out supported the floor. Wedge-shaped fans of sheet metal aluminum formed the roof, ceiling and floor. Each structure was assembled at ground level and then winched up the strut. The Dymaxion house represented the first conscious effort to build an autonomous building in the 20th century.

It was a prototype proposed to use a packaging toilet, water storage and a convection-driven ventilator built into the roof. It was designed for the stormy areas of the world: temperate oceanic islands, and the Great Plains of North America, South America and Eurasia. In most modern houses, laundry, showers and commodes are the major water uses, with drinking, cooking and dish-washing consuming less than 20 liters per day. The Dymaxion house was intended to reduce water use by a greywater system, a packaging commode, and a "fogger" to replace showers. The fogger was based on efficient compressed-air and water degreasers, but with much smaller water particles to make it comfortable.

== Description ==
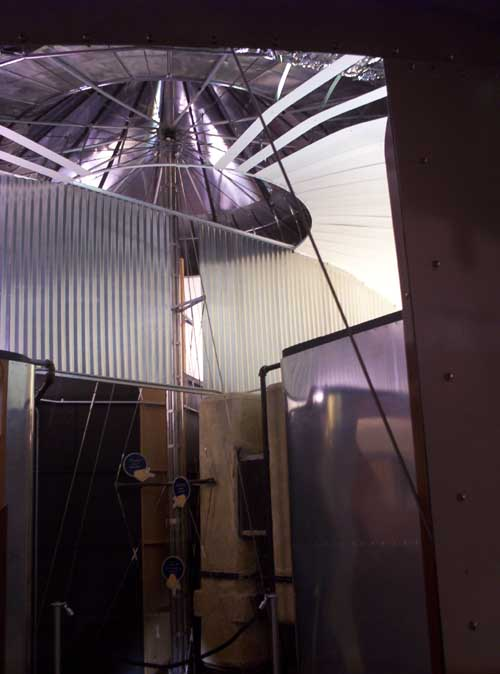
Interior of Dymaxion house showing structural details. Visible are the partially assembled aluminum ceiling, struts and exterior skin as well as the single central post which supports the entire structure and carries utilities and plumbing.

Two Dymaxion houses were prototyped, one indoor (the "Barwise" house) and one outdoor (the "Danbury" house). No Dymaxion house built according to Fuller's intentions was ever constructed and lived in. The only two prototypes of the round, aluminum house were bought by investor William Graham, together with assorted unused prototyping elements as salvage after the venture failed. In 1948, Graham constructed a hybridized version of the Dymaxion house as his family's home; the Grahams lived there into the 1970s. Graham built the round house on his lake front property, disabling the ventilator and other interior features. It was inhabited for about 30 years, although as an extension to an existing ranch house, rather than a standalone structure as intended by Fuller. In 1990, the Graham family donated this house, and all the component prototyping parts, to the Henry Ford Museum. A painstaking process was used to conserve as many original component parts and systems as possible and restore the rest using original documentation from the Fuller prototyping process. It was installed indoors in the Henry Ford Museum in 2001 with a full exhibit.

Since there was no evidence of the crucial internal rain-gutter system, some elements of the rain collecting system were omitted from the restored exhibit. The roof was designed to wick water inside and drip into the rain-gutter and then to the cistern, rather than have a difficult-to-fit, perfectly waterproof roof.

There was to be a waterless packaging toilet that deftly shrink-wrapped the waste for pickup for later composting. During the prototyping process, the idea for the packaging toilet was quickly replaced by a conventional septic system because the packaging plastic was not available. Other features worked as advertised, notably the heating, and the passive air conditioning system, based on the "dome effect".

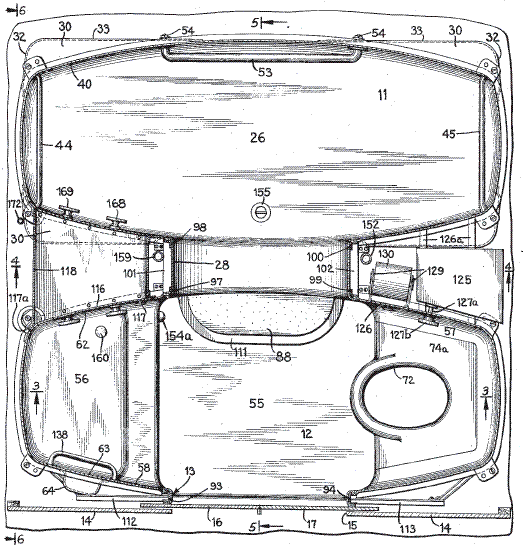
U.S. patent 2,220,482, Prefabricated bathroom, by Richard Buckminster Fuller, issued 1940

The inhabitants of the much-modified version of the house said that the bathroom was a particular delight. The bathroom consisted of two connected stamped copper bubbles, built as four nesting pieces. The bottom piece is fully plated in tin/antimony alloy and the top half is painted. Each bubble had a drain. No area had a radius of less than four inches (10 cm), to aid cleaning. The commode, shower, bathtub and sink were molded into the structural shell in one piece. One bubble contained a step-up ergonomic bathtub and shower, high enough to wash children without stooping, but just two steps (16 inches / 40 cm) up. The oval tub had the controls mounted on the inside left of the entrance to the oval tub. The other bubble was the bathroom proper with commode and sink. The ventilation for the bathroom was a large silent fan under the main sink, which kept odors away from people's noses. All lighting was totally enclosed. To prevent fogging, the mirror faced into the medicine chest, which was ventilated by the fan. A plastic version of the bathroom was available intermittently until the 1980s.

The large wrap-around windows and lightweight structures were popular with the children, who crawled on the windowsill, and twanged the bicycle-wheel-style main struts.

Fuller also designed a 10-story variant which was to have been dropped in place by the Graf Zeppelin.

== Criticism ==
Criticisms of the Dymaxion house include its supposed inflexible design which completely disregarded local site and architectural idiom, and its use of energy-intensive materials such as aluminum, rather than low-energy materials, such as adobe or tile. Fuller chose aluminium for its light weight, great strength, and long-term durability, arguably factors that compensate for the initial production cost. Aluminum was also a logical choice if the homes were to be built in aircraft factories, which, since World War II had ended, had substantial excess capacity.

The Wichita House was a project Fuller accepted during World War II as an attempt to produce cost-effective dwellings for everyone. The project continued to develop the technological concept of the Dymaxion house, now incorporating a round floor plan instead of a hexagonal one. The reactions to the prototype were extraordinarily positive; nevertheless it was not produced industrially because of (re-) tooling costs. Fuller, a consummate perfectionist, felt he could improve the design and was dissatisfied with the prototype. He refused to begin production rather than allowing the "unfinished" design to be used.

== See also ==
- Dymaxion car
- Dymaxion map
- Fly's Eye Dome
- Futuro house
- Geodesic dome
- Lustron house
- Monsanto House of the Future
- Prefabricated home
- Yurt (similar dwelling shape)
