= Dymaxion =

Artificial term used by Fuller to attribute his inventions

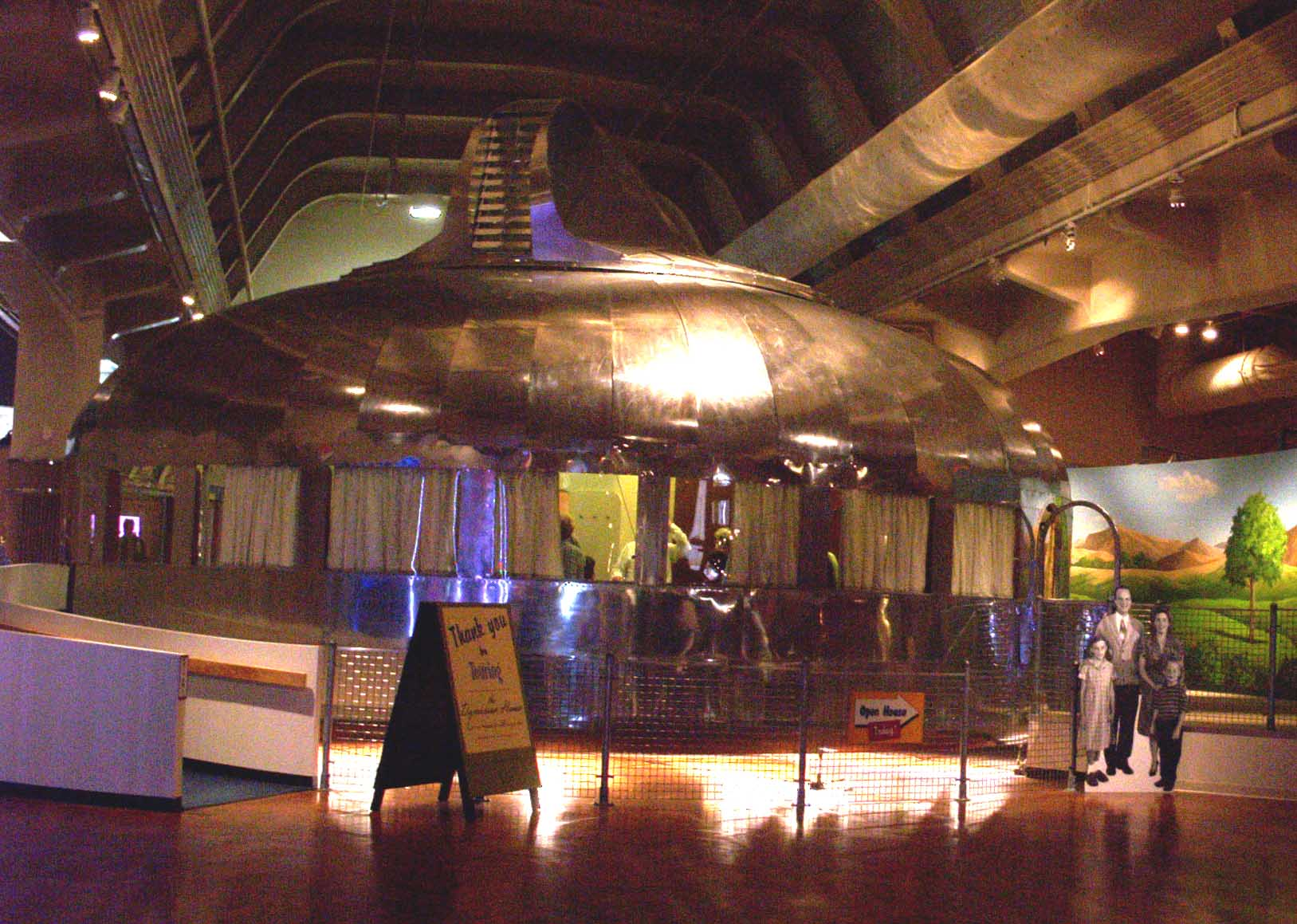
Dymaxion House as installed in Henry Ford Museum

Dymaxion is a term coined by architect and inventor Buckminster Fuller and associated with much of his work, prominently his Dymaxion house and Dymaxion car. A portmanteau of the words dynamic, maximum, and tension, Dymaxion sums up the goal of his study, "maximum gain of advantage from minimal energy input".

== Description ==
A name was needed for the display of Fuller's first architectural model, later to be known as the Dymaxion house, at the Marshall Field's department store in Chicago. To create the name, wordsmith Waldo Warren was hired by Marshall Field's and spent two days listening to Fuller, getting a feel for his idiosyncratic use of language—later playing with the syllables typical of Fuller's speech until he and Fuller agreed on the word Dymaxion.

Fuller used the word for many of his inventions during the decades to follow, including the Dymaxion house, the Dymaxion deployment unit, the Dymaxion car, and the Dymaxion world map. Dymaxion also came to describe a polyphasic sleep schedule he followed, consisting of four 30-minute naps throughout the day.

Fuller eventually renamed his elaborate journal—a highly specific, highly detailed self-documentation of his life—as the Dymaxion Chronofile.
