= Parthenolecanium corni =

Scientific classification
- Kingdom: Animalia
- Phylum: Arthropoda
- Clade: Pancrustacea
- Class: Insecta
- Order: Hemiptera
- Suborder: Sternorrhyncha
- Family: Coccidae
- Genus: Parthenolecanium
- Species: P. corni

Binomial name
- Parthenolecanium corni (Bouché, 1844)

Species of soft scale insect

Parthenolecanium corni, the European fruit scale, is a species of soft scale insect belonging to the family Coccidae within the order Hemiptera.

== Distribution and habitat ==
The species is prevalent in at least 74 countries. The species can transmit Grapevine virus A between plants.
