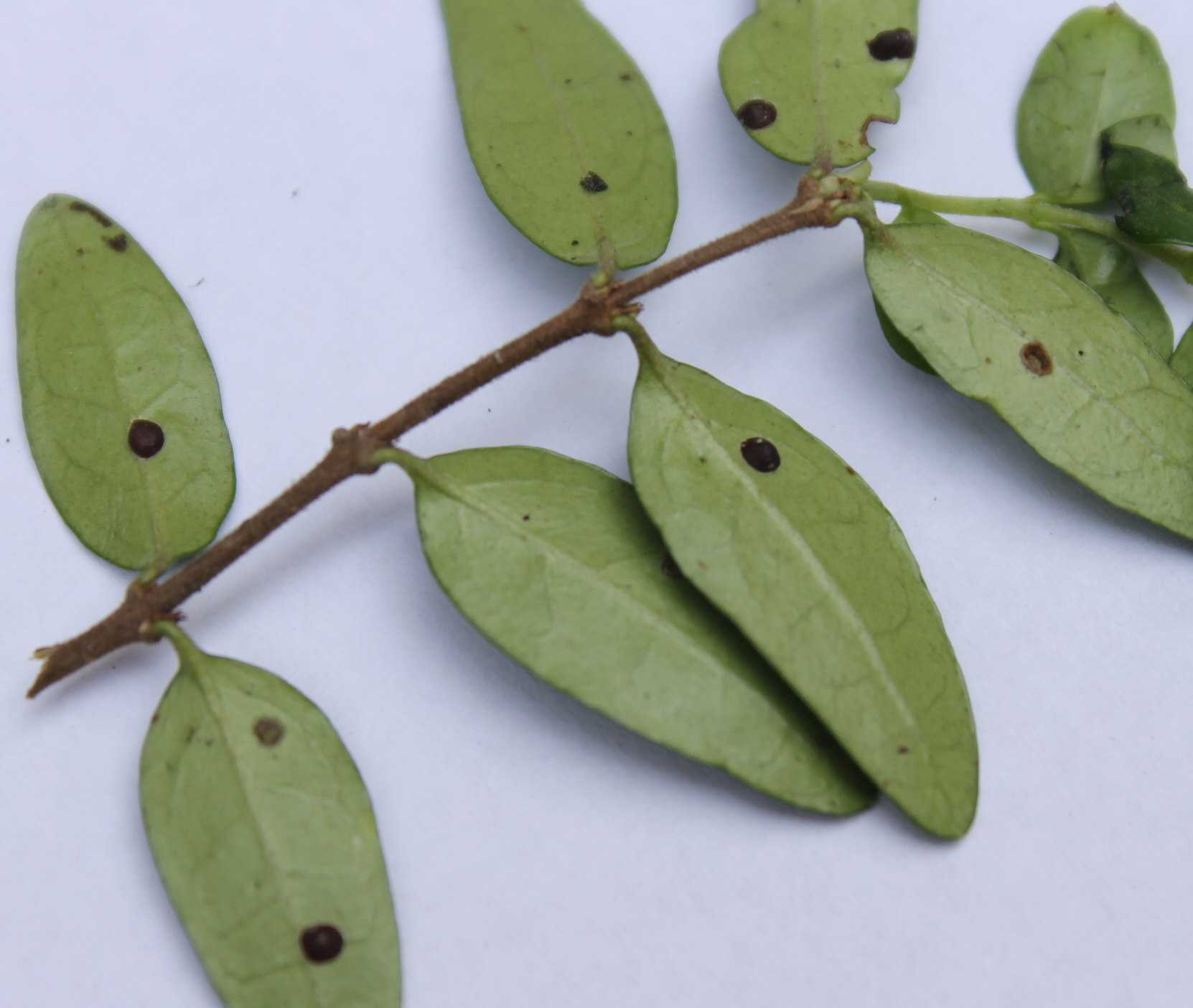

Scientific classification
- Kingdom: Animalia
- Phylum: Arthropoda
- Class: Insecta
- Order: Hemiptera
- Suborder: Sternorrhyncha
- Family: Coccidae
- Genus: Parthenolecanium; Šulc, 1908

= Parthenolecanium =

Genus of true bugs

Parthenolecanium is a genus of true bugs belonging to the family Coccidae.

The species of this genus are found in Europe, Australia and Northern America.

== Species ==
- Parthenolecanium cerasifex (Fitch, 1857)
- Parthenolecanium corni (Bouché, 1844)
- Parthenolecanium fletcheri (Cockerell, 1893)
- Parthenolecanium glandi (Kuwana, 1907)
- Parthenolecanium jaboticabae (Hempel, 1900)
- Parthenolecanium orientalis Borchsenius, 1957
- Parthenolecanium perlatum (Cockerell, 1898)
- Parthenolecanium persicae (Fabricius, 1776)
- Parthenolecanium pomeranicum (Kawecki, 1954)
- Parthenolecanium pruinosum (Coquillett, 1891)
- Parthenolecanium putmani (Phillips, 1965)
- Parthenolecanium quercifex (Fitch, 1859)
- Parthenolecanium rufulum (Cockerell, 1903)
- Parthenolecanium smreczynskii (Kawecki, 1967)
- Parthenolecanium tamaricis (Bodenheimer, 1953)
- Parthenolecanium viticis (Morrison, 1923)
