= Michael Bruse =

German geographer (born 1969)

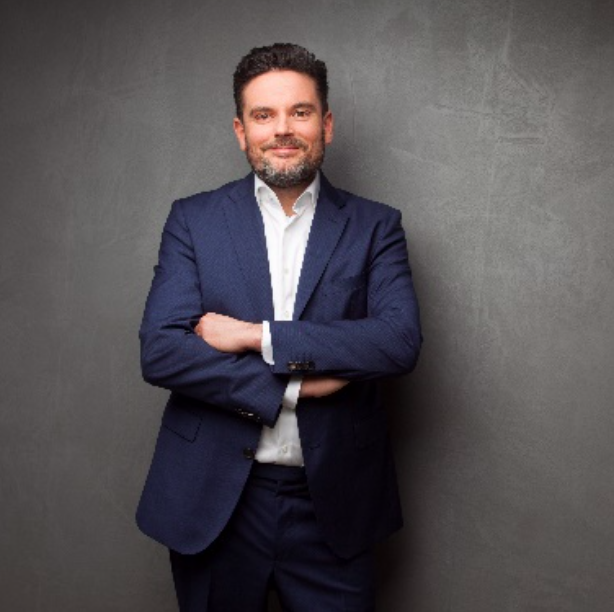
Michael Bruse

Michael Bruse (born 1969 in Essen, West Germany) is a German geographer and professor for geoinformatics at Johannes Gutenberg University Mainz. He specializes in research on urban microclimate/climatology with a methodical focus on numerical simulation. Besides his scientific work he developed the micro-climate model ENVI-met. and is founder of the company ENVI-met GmbH. ENVI-met is a holistic three-dimensional non-hydrostatic model for the simulation of surface-plant-air interactions not only limited to, but very often used to simulate urban environments and to assess the effects of green architecture visions.

== Education ==
After Highschool at the Alfred-Krupp-Gymnasium in Essen, Bruse graduated in physical geography from Ruhr-Universität Bochum in 1995 with a major in climatology and a minor in botany with a focus on geobotany and oceanography. He then started to develop the micro-climate model ENVI-met, completing his formal education in 1999 with a PhD from the Ruhr-Universität Bochum with a thesis on the effects of small-scale environmental design on the local microclimate. In 2006 his post-doctoral habilitation thesis on "Multi-Agent systems: A new approach for assessing urban environmental conditions" was accepted on the Ruhr-Universität Bochum.

== Career and research ==
Michael Bruse founded GeoTech in 1992 providing the software SHADOW which was one of the first computer programs allowing to calculate shadow casting through buildings in an 3D urban context at very high resolution. GeoTech then extend the scope of analysis to air pollution and surface temperatures and established the brand ENVI-met in 2004. In 2007 he became a full professor at the University of Mainz and head of the Department of Geoinformatics. Since then he was as well Visiting Professor in Harvard and at the Architectural Association London (AA).

From 2007 to 2018 he was partner of Werner Sobek Green Technologies in Stuttgart, Germany. In 2014 he founded ENVI-met GmbH with Daniela Bruse gathering all developed programs and modules in one place. Its core areas of expertise are microclimate and thermal comfort, solar analysis, wind flow and turbulence, Green and blue technologies, pollutant dispersion, vegetation, as well as building physics. In 2024, the ENVI-met technology has been sold to the Finnish company One Click LCA.

== Development ==
Michael Bruse is in the scientific world known for his microclimate model ENVI-met, a holistic numerical climate model, that makes it possible to simulate the effects of architecture and landscape planning on the microclimate and air quality on a scale of up to one meter. This permits to study the interactions between the climatological framework conditions, like climate change and extreme weather, and local environmental design.

ENVI-met is used worldwide, his range of application includes the evaluation of urban development projects (Melbourne 2030, RE-THINK Athens) up to the design of sustainable settlement structures ("Young Cities" project Iran of the FU Berlin).

Another research focus is the analysis of urban pollution problems, especially with regard to particulate matter and nitrogen dioxide pollution. Numerical simulations and measurements are used to develop and evaluate urban concepts that can be used to reduce the exposure of the population to air pollutants. For example, ENVI-met is the reference model of the Belgian-Dutch government initiative "Air Innovation Platform" and the Bureau of Meteorology in Melbourne, Australia. On the basis of simulation calculations, together with architects, urban planners and associations, development scenarios for districts and open spaces are created with which the negative effects of climate change can be mitigated at local level (KLIMAzwei initiative of the BMBF, Green Aspang Wien, BUGS of the EU).

== Selected publications ==
The main publication is in the micro-climate model ENVI-met, which is not a classical publication, but a software. ENVI-met has been published in more than 100 PhD theses and more than 10,000 essays applied (Google Scholar 03/2025). The list below is a cross-section of the relevant research topics. Citation index: h = 33 (calculation method Google Scholar, accessed 02/2025). The actual citation index will be significantly higher, as the ENVI-MET model has now established itself as a brand and in many essays on the correct citation is omitted.

- Yang, X.; Zhao, L.; Bruse, M. and Meng, Q (2013): Evaluation of a microclimate model for predicting the thermal behavior of different ground surfaces, Building and Environment (60), p. 93–104, DOI: 10.1016/j.buildenv.2012.11.008
- Yang, X.; Zhao, L.; Bruse, M.; Meng, Q. (2012): An integrated simulation method for building energy performance assessment in urban environments, Energy and Buildings (54), p. 243–251, DOI: 10.1016/j.embuild.2012.07.042
- Bruse, M. (2007): Simulating human thermal comfort and resulting usage patterns of urban open spaces with a Multi-agent System in: Wittkopf, St. and Tan, B. K. (eds.): Proceedings of the 24th International Conference on Passive and Low Energy Architecture PLEA, p. 699-706.
- De Ridder, K, Adamec, V., Weber, C., Bruse, M. et al. (2005): Integrated methodology to assess the benefits of urban green space, Science of the Total Environment (334-335), p. 489-497, DOI: 10.1016/j.scitotenv.2004.04.054
- Bruse, M., Fleer, H.(1998): Simulating surface–plant–air interactions inside urban environments with a three dimensional numerical model
