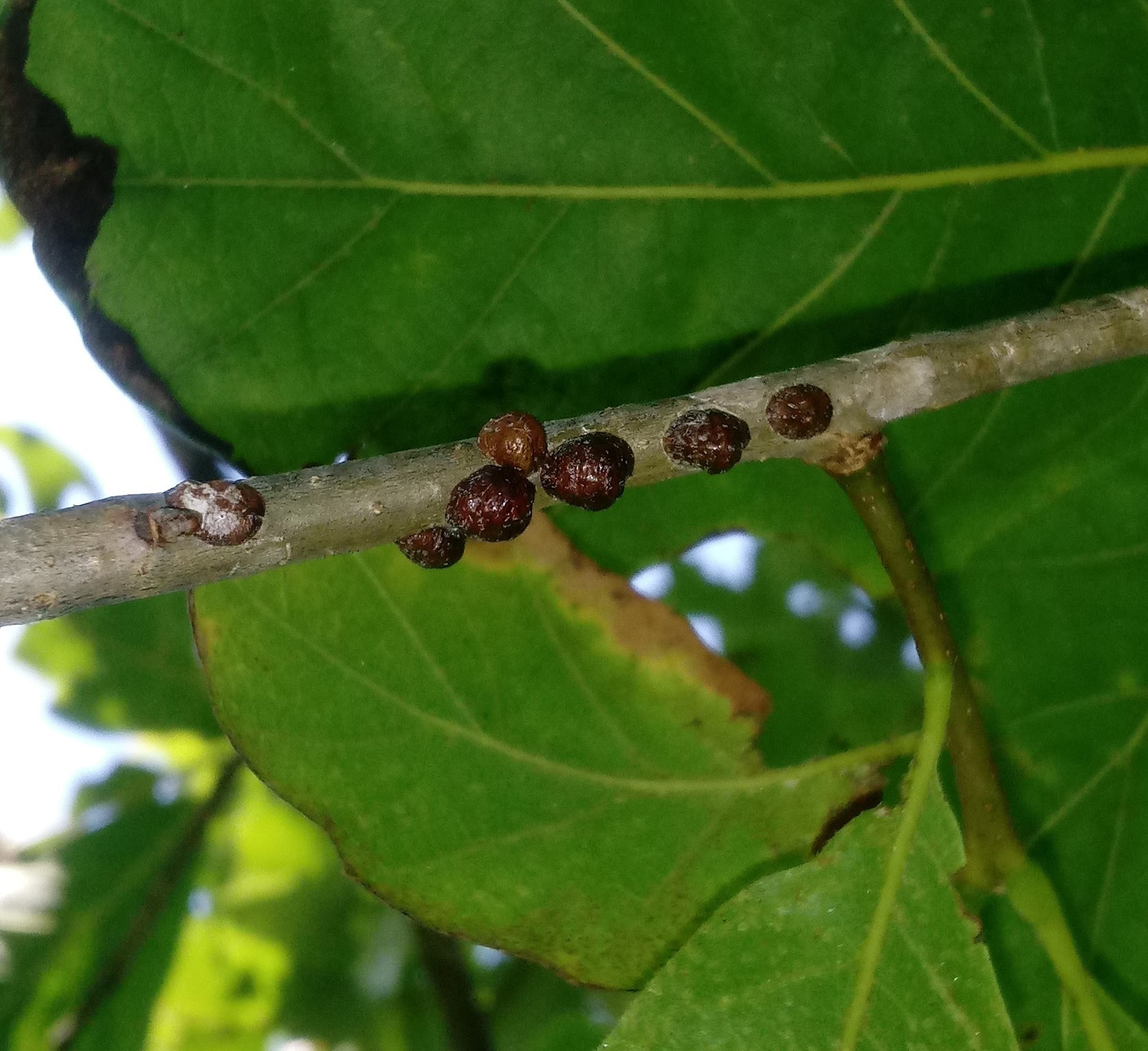

Scientific classification
- Domain: Eukaryota
- Kingdom: Animalia
- Phylum: Arthropoda
- Class: Insecta
- Order: Hemiptera
- Suborder: Sternorrhyncha
- Family: Coccidae
- Genus: Parthenolecanium
- Species: P. quercifex

Binomial name
- Parthenolecanium quercifex (Fitch, 1859)

= Parthenolecanium quercifex =

Species of soft scale insect

Parthenolecanium quercifex, the oak lecanium scale, is a species of soft scale insect belonging to the family Coccidae within the order Hemiptera.

== Etymology ==
The scientific name, Parthenolecanium quercifex, refers to the oak tree (Quercus) as its primary host.

== Description ==
Adult females have a hemispherical shape and measure 4–7 mm in length and 3–5 mm in width. They exhibit color variations of light to dark brown/gray, often featuring lateral humps on their back.

The insect closely resembles other scale species, leading to uncertainty about its identity and the possible existence of a cryptic species complex.

== Distribution and habitat ==
The species is prevalent in the eastern United States. It primarily infests oak trees but has been observed on other species, such as hickory and birch.

== Ecology ==
The oak lecanium scale undergoes one annual generation. Egg laying occurs in late May to June, and hatching takes place in June to early July. The egg count varies, influenced by multiple factors, with reports ranging from dozens to thousands per female. The young crawlers move to host plant leaves, where they feed on leaf undersides, mainly along the main veins, using piercing-sucking mouthparts. The initial instars are tiny, measuring less than 1 mm, and are pale yellow/brown. These insects molt into second instars in late summer/fall and return to woody tissues, such as host plant twigs, for overwintering. In spring, females grow and mature, adopting the distinctive hemispherical shape.

Oak lecanium scales feed on tree and shrub phloem, causing issues such as stunted foliage, chlorosis, twig death, and dieback, primarily during April-May due to feeding female scales. Their feeding produces honeydew, which can lead to the growth of black sooty mold.
