= Urban dust dome =

Air pollution dome formed above urban areas

Urban dust domes are localized meteorological phenomena in which soot, dust, and chemical emissions accumulate in the air above urban areas. They form when calm surface winds converge over a city, rise with convective currents, and become trapped by stable air masses associated with the urban heat island (UHI) effect. The resulting dome of pollutants can intensify smog formation, reduce visibility, and contribute to adverse health outcomes. The concept was first described in the early 1970s and remains a focus of urban climatology and air quality research.

== Formation and Mechanism ==
Dust domes form when pollutants emitted from vehicles, industry, and heating systems are lifted by convective currents over urban centers. The urban heat island effect enhances this upward motion by warming the city relative to its surroundings. Once aloft, the pollutants are trapped beneath a stable atmospheric layer, creating a dome‑shaped concentration of particulate matter and gases.

== Relation to Urban Heat Islands ==
Urban dust domes are closely linked to UHIs. The elevated surface and air temperatures in cities strengthen convection, which lifts pollutants higher into the atmosphere. Without strong winds to disperse them, these pollutants remain concentrated above the city. In this sense, dust domes are often described as a byproduct of the UHI phenomenon.

== Environmental and Health Impacts ==
The accumulation of pollutants within a dust dome contributes to photochemical smog, particularly when nitrogen oxides and volatile organic compounds react under sunlight. This can reduce visibility and degrade air quality. Health impacts include increased respiratory stress, exacerbation of asthma, and heightened vulnerability during heat waves, when high temperatures and poor air quality interact.

== Research History ==
The concept of the urban dust dome was first introduced in the early 1970s by Wilfrid Bach, who documented variations in solar attenuation over urban areas. Subsequent research in urban climatology and air pollution studies has refined the understanding of dust domes, linking them to broader issues of urban sustainability and climate adaptation.
