= Jens Bergensten =

Swedish video game programmer and designer (born 1979)

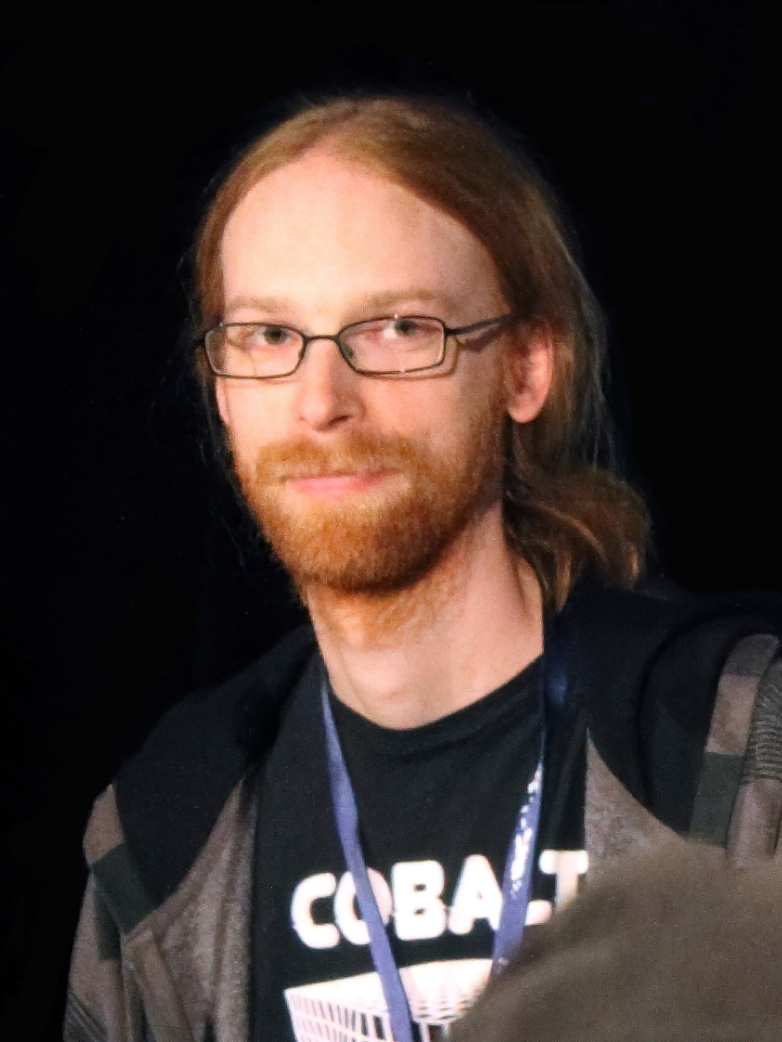
- Bergensten in 2012
- Born: Jens Peder Bergensten; 18 May 1979 (age 47); Örebro, Sweden
- Other name: Jeb
- Education: Lund University (MS)
- Occupations: Video game programmer and designer
- Known for: Lead developer of Minecraft
- Title: Chief creative officer of Mojang Studios
- Spouse: Jenny Bergensten (m. 2013)
- Children: 1

Jens Peder Bergensten (Swedish pronunciation: [jɛns ˈbɛrjɛnsteːn]; born 18 May 1979), known professionally as Jeb, is a Swedish video game programmer and designer. He is best known as the lead designer of Minecraft, and is the chief creative officer of Mojang Studios. In 2013, he, along with Minecraft creator Markus "Notch" Persson, was named as one of Time's 100 most influential people in the world. As an employee of Mojang Studios, he had been co-developing Minecraft with Persson since 2010, became the lead designer in 2011, and assumed full control in 2014, when Persson left the company after its acquisition.

== Personal life ==
Jens Peder Bergensten was born on 18 May 1979 in Örebro, Sweden.

On 11 May 2013, Bergensten married photographer Jenny Bergensten (née Thornell). On 10 December 2015, Bergensten had a son, Björn.

== Career ==
Bergensten started programming his first games at 11 years old, using BASIC and Turbo Pascal. By age 21, he was a mapper and modder for the first-person shooter game Quake III Arena. He worked as a C++ and Java programmer for the game developer Korkeken Interactive Studio, which went bankrupt and became Oblivion Entertainment. After the insolvency of Oblivion Entertainment, Bergensten moved to Malmö and earned a master's degree in computer science at Lund University in 2008.

=== Early standalone projects ===
During his time working at Korkeken (meaning the cork oak), Bergensten spent his free time leading the development for the online role-playing game Whispers in Akarra, which entertained a small playerbase of several hundred players. He later discontinued this project after straying from the team's original creative vision for the project. Bergensten publicly released the world editors and source code for Akarra's server client in 2008.

Afterwards, he founded the indie game development company Oxeye Game Studio with Daniel Brynolf and Pontus Hammarber, who wanted to create a spiritual successor to Whispers in Akarra. The studio's first project was Dawn of Daria, a self-described "massively-multiplayer fantasy life simulator". After several public alpha tests, the project was discontinued like its predecessor, and Oxeye Games Studio switched their focus to various game jam project and tech demos. The company was soon known for the real-time strategy game Harvest: Massive Encounter and later the platform games Cobalt and Cobalt WASD.

Until 24 November 2010, Bergensten worked for the online knowledge community; Planeto.

=== Mojang Studios ===
In November 2010, Bergensten was hired as Mojang's back-end developer for Scrolls (now known as Caller's Bane). He later began programming increasingly significant parts of Minecraft until he became its lead designer in December 2011, taking over from Markus Persson. Bergensten was part of the team that developed Catacomb Snatch as part of Humble Bundle Mojam, a game jam. Bergensten has been featured in the teaser videos for Minecraft Live along with Agnes Larsson.

Currently, Bergensten serves as the chief creative officer of Mojang Studios.

== Ludography ==
- Harvest: Massive Encounter (2008)
- Minecraft (2011)
- Caller's Bane (2014)
- Cobalt (2016)
- Cobalt WASD (2017)

== Filmography ==
=== Film ===
Year	Title	Role	Notes	Ref.
2025	A Minecraft Movie	Waiter	Cameo	

=== Television/Internet ===
Year	Title	Role	Notes	Ref.
2012	Game On!	Himself	1 episode	
2012	Minecraft: The Story of Mojang	Himself		
2015	Gameloading: Rise of the Indies	Himself		
2021	Det Svenska Spelundret	Himself	2 episodes	

== Awards and nominations ==
Year	Nominated work	Category	Award	Result	Notes	Ref.
2011	Minecraft	Best Debut Game, Innovation Award, Best Downloadable Game	Game Developers Choice Awards	Won		
