= Crown and Council =

2016 video game

- Developer(s): Mojang
- Publisher(s): Mojang
- Designer(s): Henrik Pettersson
- Platform(s): Microsoft Windows
- Release: April 22, 2016
- Genre(s): Turn-based strategy
- Mode(s): Single-player

Crown and Council is a turn-based strategy game developed by Mojang employee Henrik Pettersson. The game was both announced and released as a surprise on Steam on April 22, 2016 and was made available for free.

== Gameplay ==
The game puts the player in control of a nation warring against others on a tile-based map. Each turn, the player earns income based on conquered tiles, and can spend earned money to conquer other tiles or improve their own through the construction of structures like forts, villages and universities, which all provide different bonuses. The player wins a map once they have eliminated every enemy, regardless of actual remaining neutral tiles. There are 75 maps, with the possibility of additional maps being procedurally generated.

== Development and release ==
The game was developed entirely by Mojang programmer Henrik Pettersson. It was originally conceived in a 72-hour game jam, and was inspired by the games History of the World and Slay. Pettersson described the game as "experimental", and that while Mojang remains "a Minecraft company doing Minecraft things" and that most of the prototyping happens within the Minecraft environment, developers have some time set aside to work on their own ideas. As a hobby project, Crown and Council was not originally intended for public release; Pettersson, an artist who joined Mojang to work on Scrolls in 2011, used the relatively simple project to learn to code. He believed that even if the game was to be distributed one day, it would be rebuilt by "real programmers". The game was worked on over multiple months and used bits of code taken from other Mojang projects. Pettersson credits Minecraft Pocket Edition programmer Aron Nieminen as his programming mentor.

It is the first game developed by Mojang that is released on Steam, although Mojang published Oxeye Game Studio's Cobalt on Steam in February 2016. The Steam release was originally suggested by Mojang producer Daniel Kaplan, and the opportunity was used to learn the process, which Pettersson describes as "surprisingly straightforward", noting that Mojang parent company Microsoft had no issues with licensing and trademarking Crown and Council for release on Steam.

Pettersson originally said he planned on continuing working on the game to fix bugs and add features. An update released in January 2017 added a 99-map campaign and tweaks to the procedural generation and land-taking mechanics to improve balance. The most important change was in the calculations affecting the attack and defence of territories: the element of "randomness" was removed, and "attrition" was added, meaning that failed attacks improve the chance of future attacks succeeding. This update also added macOS and Linux versions.

== Reception ==
The game has been described as a faster paced, minimalistic strategy game reminiscent of Risk or Civilization, and as a single-player Eight Minute Empire. It was also described as traditional but entertaining, with a good challenge, but it runs out of content after just a few levels.

It has received mixed user reviews from players. It was estimated to be downloaded about 60,000 times in the month following its release.
