= Mojang Studios =

Swedish video game developer

Coordinates: 59°19′14.6″N 18°3′5.3″E

Mojang AB
- Logo used since 2020

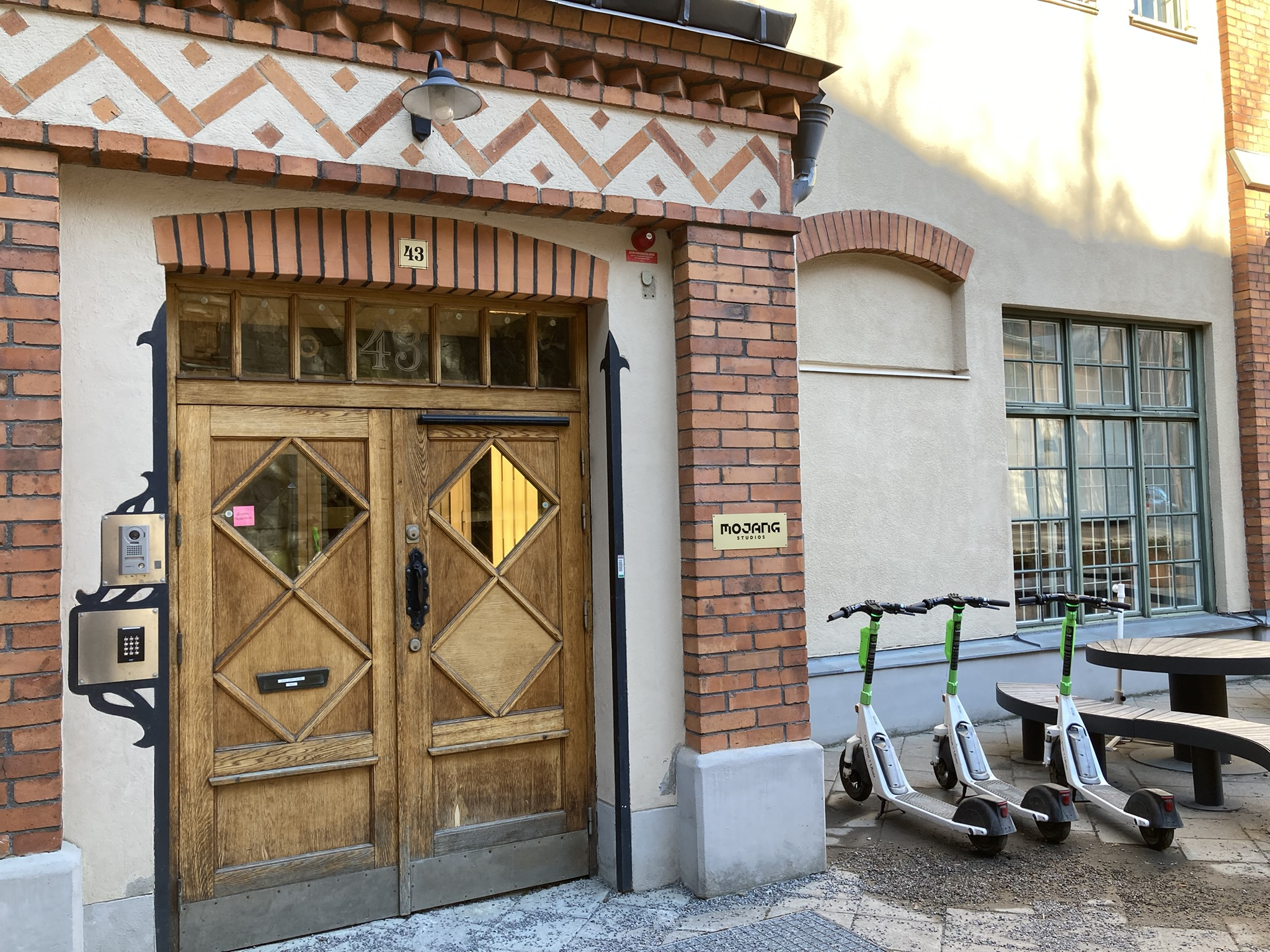
- Headquarters on Söder Mälarstrand 43, Stockholm (pictured in 2022)
- Trade name: Mojang Studios (2020–present)
- Formerly: Mojang Specifications (2009–2010)
- Type: Subsidiary
- Industry: Video games
- Founded: 18 June 2009; 17 years ago
- Founder: Markus Persson
- Headquarters: Stockholm, Sweden
- Number of locations: 5 (2021)
- Key people: Maria Angelidou-Smith (CEO)
- Products: Minecraft series
- Number of employees: ≈600 (2021)
- Parent: Xbox Game Studios (2014–2026); Xbox (2026–present)

Mojang AB, trading as Mojang Studios, is a Swedish video game developer and a studio of Xbox based in Stockholm. The studio is best known for developing the sandbox and survival game Minecraft, the best-selling video game of all time.

Mojang Studios was founded by the independent video game designer Markus Persson in 2009 as Mojang Specifications for Minecraft's development. The studio inherited its name from another video game venture Persson had left two years prior. Following the game's initial release, Persson, in conjunction with Jakob Porsér, incorporated the business in late 2010, and they hired Carl Manneh as the company's chief executive officer. Other early hires included Daniel Kaplan and Jens Bergensten. Minecraft became highly successful, giving Mojang sustained growth. With a desire to move on from the game, Persson offered to sell his share in Mojang, and the company was acquired by Microsoft for its Microsoft Studios (later Xbox Game Studios) unit in November 2014. Persson, Porsér, and Manneh subsequently left Mojang. The company was rebranded as Mojang Studios in May 2020 and changed to reporting to Microsoft's Xbox division in July 2026.

As of 2021, Mojang Studios employs approximately 600 people and has additional locations in London, Shanghai, Tokyo, and Redmond, Washington, where Microsoft is headquartered. Maria Angelidou-Smith is the chief executive officer. Apart from Minecraft, Mojang Studios has developed Caller's Bane, Crown and Council, and further games in the Minecraft franchise: Minecraft Dungeons, Minecraft Legends, and the cancelled Minecraft Earth. It also released smaller games as part of game jams organised by Humble Bundle and published the externally developed Cobalt and Cobalt WASD.

== History ==
=== Background and formation (2009–2010) ===
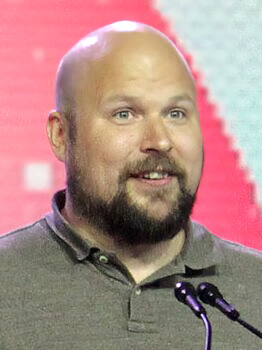
Markus Persson founded Mojang Studios in 2009.

Mojang Studios was founded by Markus Persson, a Swedish independent video game designer and programmer, in 2009. He had gained interest in video games at an early age, playing The Bard's Tale and several pirated games on his father's Commodore 128 home computer, and learned to programme at age eight with help from his sister. Because he was a "loner" in school, he spent most of his spare time with games and programming at home. Following his graduation and a few years of working as a web developer, Persson created Wurm Online, a massively multiplayer online role-playing game, with his colleague Rolf Jansson in 2003. They used the name "Mojang Specifications" during the development and, as the game started turning a profit, incorporated the company Mojang Specifications AB (an aktiebolag) in 2007. The name is derived from the Swedish word mojäng (Swedish pronunciation: [mʊˈjɛŋː]; lit. 'gadget'). Persson left the project in the same year and wished to reuse the name, so Jansson renamed the company Onetoofree AB and later Code Club AB. Meanwhile, Persson had joined Midas, later known as King.com, where he developed 25–30 games. He departed the company when he was barred from creating games in his free time.

In May 2009, Persson began working on a clone of Infiniminer, a game developed by Zachtronics and released earlier that year. Persson reused assets and parts of the engine code from an earlier personal project and released the first alpha version of the game, now titled Minecraft, on 17 May 2009, followed by the first commercial version on 13 June. He reused the name "Mojang Specifications" for this release, registering a sole proprietorship with this name on 18 June. In less than a month, Minecraft had generated enough revenue for Persson to take time off his day job, which he was able to quit entirely by May 2010. As all sales were processed through the game's website, he did not have to split income with third parties. The payment services provider PayPal temporarily disabled his account when it suspected fraud.

In September 2010, Persson travelled to Bellevue, Washington, to the offices of video game company Valve, where he took part in a programming exercise and met with Gabe Newell, before being offered a job at the company. He turned down the offer and instead contacted Jakob Porsér, a former colleague from King.com, to ask for aid in establishing a business out of Mojang Specifications. Porsér quickly quit his job, and the pair incorporated Mojang AB on 17 September. While Persson continued working on Minecraft, Porsér would develop Scrolls, a digital collectible card game. Wishing to focus on game development, they hired Carl Manneh, a manager at jAlbum, Persson's former employer, as chief executive officer. Other significant early hires included Daniel Kaplan as business developer, Markus Toivonen as art director, and Jens Bergensten as lead programmer.

=== Continued growth (2011–2013) ===
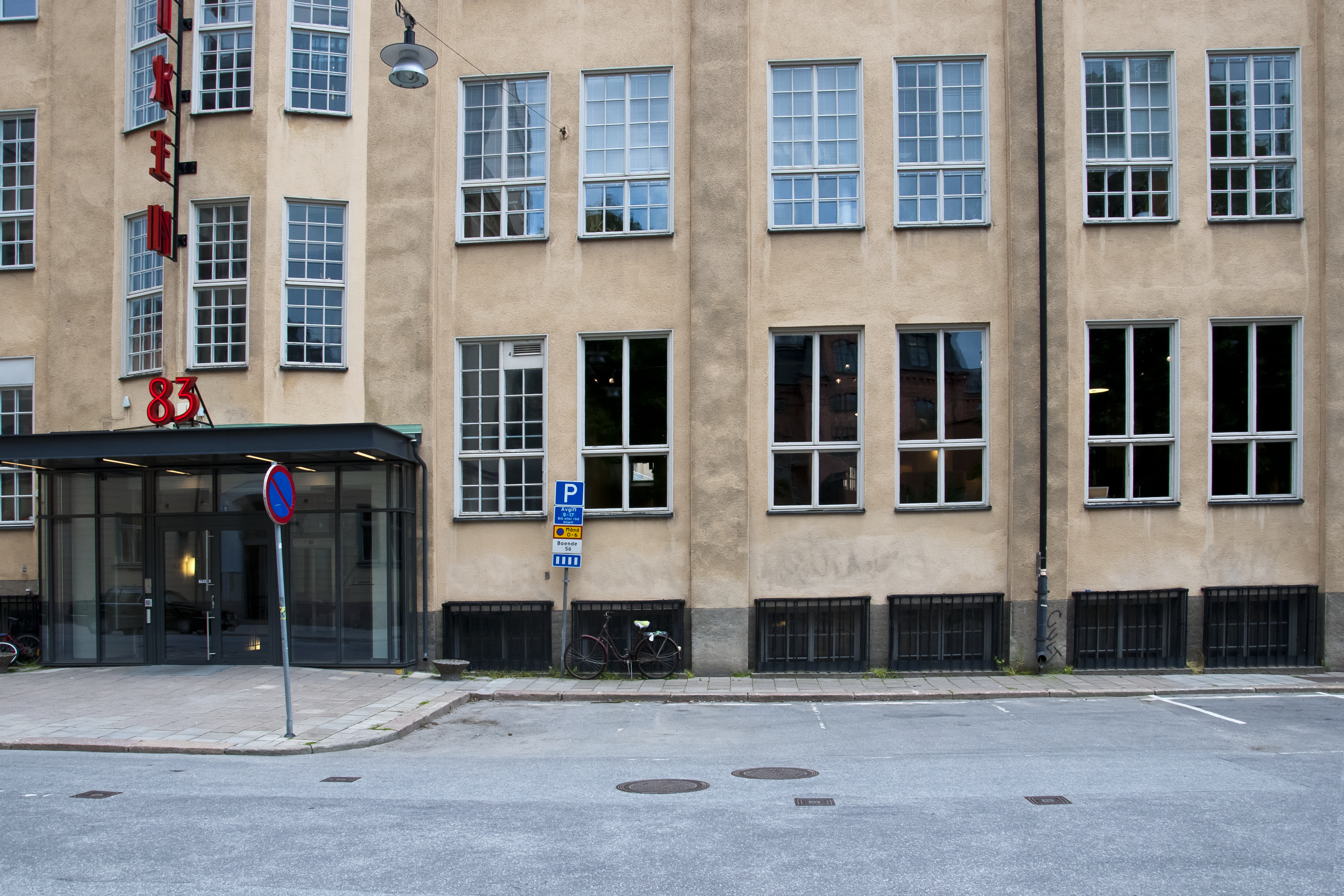
Mojang's offices were formerly located at Maria Skolgata 83, Stockholm.

In January 2011, Minecraft reached 1 million registered accounts and 20 million six months thereafter. The continued success led Mojang to start the development of a new version for mobile devices. Due to the incompatibility of the game's Java-based framework with mobile devices, this version was programmed in C++. Another version, initially developed for Xbox 360, was outsourced to Scotland-based developer 4J Studios, which also used C++. Scrolls was announced by Mojang in March 2011. The studio's attempt to trademark the game's name resulted in a dispute with ZeniMax Media, which cited similarities between the game's name and that of the ZeniMax-owned The Elder Scrolls series. Kaplan stated in May 2011 that, due to many such requests in the past, Mojang was planning to publish or co-publish games from other indie game studios. Its first, Cobalt from Oxeye Game Studio, was announced in August. An early version of the game was made available in December 2011, with the full game released in February 2016 for Xbox 360, Xbox One, and Windows. A multiplayer-focused spin-off, Cobalt WASD, was also developed by Oxeye Game Studio and released by Mojang for Windows in November 2017 after some time in early access.

For the full release of Minecraft, Mojang held Minecon, a dedicated convention, in Las Vegas on 18–19 November 2011, with Minecraft formally being released during a presentation on the first day. Thereafter, Minecon was turned into an annual event. Following Minecraft's full release, Persson transferred his role as lead designer for the game to Bergensten in December 2011.

Around this time, Manneh had discussions with a plethora of venture capital firms, including Sequoia Capital and Accel Partners, but turned all of them down as the company did not require any funds. Sean Parker, the co-founder of Napster and former president of Facebook, Inc., offered to privately invest in Mojang in 2011 but was turned down as well. At the time, the studio ruled out being sold or becoming a public company to maintain its independence, which was said to have heavily contributed to Minecraft's success. By March 2012, Minecraft had sold 5 million copies, amounting to US$80 million in revenue. In November, Mojang had 25 employees, and total revenues of $237.7 million in 2012. In 2013, it released an education-focused version of Minecraft for Raspberry Pi devices, and—after the exclusivity clause penned with Microsoft over the availability of the game's console edition on Microsoft's platforms had expired—announced editions of the game for PlayStation 3, PlayStation 4, and PlayStation Vita. In October 2013, Jonas Mårtensson, formerly of gambling company Betsson, was hired as Mojang's vice-president. That year, Mojang recorded revenues of $330 million, of which $129 million were profit.

=== Microsoft subsidiary (2014–present) ===
Persson, exhausted from the pressure of being the owner of Minecraft, tweeted in June 2014 asking whether anyone would be willing to purchase his share in Mojang. Several parties expressed interest in this offer, including Activision Blizzard, Electronic Arts, and Microsoft. Phil Spencer, the head of Microsoft's Xbox division, urged Microsoft's newly appointed chief executive Satya Nadella to purchase Mojang to set out "a pretty bold vision" for Microsoft's gaming business. Furthermore, the company had $2.5 billion in offshore bank accounts that it could not bring back to the United States without paying repatriation taxes. Nadella separately stated the possible use of Minecraft with the HoloLens, Microsoft's mixed reality device, to have been a major factor in pursuing the acquisition. The company first approached Mojang regarding a potential acquisition in June 2014, making its first offer shortly thereafter. Mojang subsequently hired advisers from JPMorgan Chase.

Microsoft announced its agreement to purchase Mojang for $2.5 billion on 15 September 2014. The acquisition was finalised on 6 November, and Mojang became part of the Microsoft Studios (later Xbox Game Studios) branch. Persson, Porsér, and Manneh were the only shareholders at this time, with Persson owning 71% of shares. Persson received $1.8 billion, while Porsér and Manneh got $300 million and $100 million, respectively. All three subsequently left Mojang, and Mårtensson succeeded Manneh. Bergensten said the change in ownership went against the studio's indie culture. Many employees were wary about the uncertainties they could face after the acquisition, and some staffers cried at the offices. Everyone who remained with the company for six months thereafter was awarded a bonus of roughly $300,000 (after taxes), deducted from Persson's share. Under the oversight of Microsoft's Matt Booty, Mojang's integration was minimal, leaving its operations independent but backed by Microsoft's financial and technical capabilities. This approach shaped how Microsoft would acquire other gaming companies.

Scrolls was released out-of-beta in December 2014 and development of further content ceased in 2015. Also in December 2014, Mojang and Telltale Games jointly announced a partnership in which the latter would develop Minecraft: Story Mode, an episodic, narrative-driven game set in the Minecraft universe. In April 2016, Mojang released Crown and Council, a turn-based strategy game entirely developed by artist Henrik Pettersson (who had been hired in August 2011), for free for Windows. An update in January 2017 introduced Linux and macOS versions. Mojang discontinued the online services for Scrolls in February 2018 and re-released the game under a free-to-play model and with the name Caller's Bane in June. Aiming to expand the Minecraft franchise with further games, Mojang developed two spin-offs: Minecraft Dungeons, a dungeon crawler, and Minecraft Earth, an augmented reality mobile game in the vein of Pokémon Go.

Minecraft Classic, a browser-based version of Minecraft's first public alpha release, was released for free on its ten-year anniversary in May 2019. By this time, Minecraft had sold 147 million copies, making it the best-selling video game of all time. Persson was explicitly excluded from the festivities due to his controversial tweets starting in 2016, regarding gender, feminism, race, and expressing support for the Pizzagate and QAnon conspiracy theories. An update for Minecraft removed references to Persson. On 17 May 2020, Minecraft's eleventh anniversary, Mojang announced its rebranding to Mojang Studios, aiming to reflect its multi-studio structure, and introduced a new logo. The design was created at the agency Bold under the creative direction of Oliver Helfrich. Minecraft Dungeons was released later that month for Windows, Nintendo Switch, PlayStation 4, and Xbox One. In June 2022, the studio announced the action-strategy game Minecraft Legends.

Helen Chiang, the six-year head of studio for Mojang Studios, acceded to Xbox Game Studios in December 2023 and was replaced by Åsa Bredin in the same role. When Bredin stepped down in February 2025 to focus on personal goals outside the company, Kayleen Walters was appointed in her place, in addition to Amy Stillion as chief of staff. Mojang Studios developed Minecraft Dungeons II, again with Double Eleven, which is slated for release in 2026. The studio worked with Merlin Entertainment to design the Minecraft World theme park, which is set to open at Chessington World of Adventures in 2027. In July 2026, as part of a major restructuring within Microsoft's gaming business, Mojang Studios was made to report directly to Asha Sharma of the Xbox division. In October, Xbox opened its XP transmedia division and appointed Walters as its president. In her place, Reddit's chief product officer, Maria Angelidou-Smith, was hired as the chief executive officer of Mojang Studios.

== Games developed ==
List of games developed by Mojang Studios
Year	Title	Platform(s)	Notes	Ref.
2011	Minecraft	Android, Fire OS, iOS, Linux, macOS, Raspberry Pi, tvOS, Windows, Windows Phone		
2014	Caller's Bane	Android, macOS, Windows	Originally titled Scrolls	
2016	Crown and Council	Linux, macOS, Windows		
2020	Minecraft Dungeons	Nintendo Switch, PlayStation 4, Windows, Xbox One	Co-developed with Double Eleven	
2023	Minecraft Legends	Nintendo Switch, PlayStation 4, PlayStation 5, Windows, Xbox One, Xbox Series X/S	Co-developed with Blackbird Interactive	
2026	Minecraft Dungeons II	Nintendo Switch, Nintendo Switch 2, PlayStation 5, Windows, Xbox Series X/S	Co-developed with Double Eleven	
TBA	Minecraft Blast	iOS	Co-developed with King	

=== Game jam games ===
Mojang partnered with Humble Bundle in 2012 to launch Mojam, a game jam event to raise money for charity, as part of which Mojang developed the shoot 'em up mini-game Catacomb Snatch. The resulting bundle was sold 81,575 times, raising $458,248.99. The following year, Mojang developed three mini-games for Mojam 2. The studio also participated in Humble Bundle's Games Against Ebola game jam in 2014 with three further mini-games.

List of game jam games developed by Mojang Studios
Year	Title	Event	Ref.
2012	Catacomb Snatch	Mojam	
2013	Nuclear Pizza War	Mojam 2	
2013	Endless Nuclear Kittens	Mojam 2	
2013	Battle Frogs	Mojam 2	
2014	Docktor	Games Against Ebola	
2014	Healthcore Evolved	Games Against Ebola	
2014	Snake Oil Stanley	Games Against Ebola	

=== Unreleased games ===
In 2011, Persson and Kaplan envisioned a hybrid of Minecraft and Lego bricks and agreed with the Lego Group to develop the game as Brickcraft, codenamed Rex Kwon Do (in reference to the film Napoleon Dynamite). The game has also been described as a first-person shooter. Mojang hired two new programmers to work on the game, while a prototype was created by Persson. However, Mojang cancelled the project after six months. Upon announcing the cancellation in July 2012, Persson stated that the move was performed so that Mojang could focus on the games it wholly owned. Daniel Mathiasen, a Lego Group employee at the time, later blamed the cancellation on a series of legal hurdles that the Lego Group had put in place to protect the product's family-friendly image. Kaplan lamented that the staff at Mojang had felt more like consultants on the project, rather than its designers. The Lego Group also considered acquiring Mojang at this point but later decided against doing so as they had not foreseen that Minecraft would become as popular as it would at one point be.

In March 2012, Persson revealed that he would be designing a sandbox space trading and combat simulator in the vein of Elite. Titled 0x10^{c}, it was to be set in the year 281,474,976,712,644 AD in a parallel universe. The project was shelved by August 2013, with Persson citing a lack of interest and a creative block.

Minecraft Earth was made available as an early-access game in November 2019 for Android and iOS. In January 2021, it was announced that the game would be withdrawn from sale in June that year, with all player data deleted in July. Mojang Studios cited the then-ongoing COVID-19 pandemic as the primary reason for the game's closure, as its effects conflicted with the game's concept.

== Games published ==
List of games published by Mojang Studios
Year	Title	Platform(s)	Developer(s)	Ref.
2016	Cobalt	Windows, Xbox 360, Xbox One	Oxeye Game Studio	
2017	Cobalt WASD	Windows	Oxeye Game Studio	

== Legal disputes ==
=== Scrolls naming dispute ===
In August 2011, after Mojang had attempted to trademark the word "Scrolls" for their game, ZeniMax Media, the parent company of The Elder Scrolls publisher Bethesda Softworks, issued a cease and desist letter, claiming that Scrolls infringed on ZeniMax's "The Elder Scrolls" trademark, that Mojang could not use the name, and that ZeniMax would sue the studio over the word's usage. Persson offered to give up the trademark and give Scrolls a subtitle. However, as Mojang ignored the cease and desist letter, ZeniMax filed the lawsuit in September. Bethesda's Pete Hines stated that Bethesda was not responsible for the lawsuit, rather the issue was centred around "lawyers who understand it". Mojang won an interim injunction in October, the ruling being that Scrolls and The Elder Scrolls were too easy to differentiate, though ZeniMax could still appeal the ruling. In March 2012, Mojang and ZeniMax settled, with all "Scrolls" trademarks and trademark applications being transferred to ZeniMax, who would in turn licence the name to Mojang for use with Scrolls and add-on content, but not for sequels or any other games with similar names.

=== Uniloc USA, Inc. et al v. Mojang AB ===
On 20 July 2012, Uniloc, a company specialising in digital rights management technologies, filed a lawsuit against Mojang, stating that the licence verification system in Minecraft's Android version infringed on one of Uniloc's patents. The case was Uniloc USA, Inc. et al v. Mojang AB and was filed with the United States District Court for the Eastern District of Texas. In response to hate mail, Uniloc founder Ric Richardson denied his involvement, claiming to have only filed the patent. The patent was invalidated in March 2016.

=== Putt-Putt cease and desist ===
In July 2013, the minigolf chain Putt-Putt issued a cease and desist letter against Mojang and Don Mattrick (who was previously affiliated with Minecraft's Xbox 360 version but had since joined Zynga), alleging that they infringed on its "Putt-Putt" trademark. Attached to the letter, which Persson shared on Twitter, was a Google Search screenshot showing videos of user-created maps using the name. Alex Chapman, Mojang's lawyer, stated "I think there is clearly a misunderstanding here as to what Minecraft actually is. It's a game that, among other things, allows people to build things. Mojang doesn't control what users build and Mojang doesn't control the content of the videos users make. Suing Mojang for what people do using Minecraft is like suing Microsoft for what people do using Word."
