= Castle Story =

2017 RTS videogame

- Developer: Sauropod Studio
- Publisher: Sauropod Studio
- Composers: Josh Whelchel, Mattias Häggstrom Gerdt and Vibe Avenue
- Engine: Unity
- Platforms: Linux, macOS, Microsoft Windows
- Release: 17 August 2017
- Genre: Sandbox
- Modes: Single-player, multiplayer

Castle Story is a 2017 sandbox and real-time strategy game developed by Sauropod Studio. Funded through the crowdfunding website Kickstarter in 2012, the game launched in September 2013 in early access and was fully released in August 2017.

== Gameplay ==
In Castle Story, the player controls workers called "Bricktrons," which can be directed to gather resources, build castles, and fight enemies. The aim is to build a castle that can withstand attacks from creatures and other players. The game takes place on massive floating islands.

== Development ==
Castle Story was the debut game developed by Sauropod Studio, an indie game developer based in Montreal, Canada. The game was first announced in December 2011; around this time, Sauropod was a team of two people. Sauropod Studio was formally founded as a company on 24 April 2012 by François Alain (general director), Germain Couet (artistic director), and Benoît Alain (lead programmer and chief technical officer). A crowdfunding campaign was launched through Kickstarter's website on 27 July 2012, seeking US$80,000. This goal was reached and exceeded within five hours of the campaign's launch. The campaign concluded after one month, with a total of $700,000 pledged. Sauropod credited Markus Persson, the creator of the Minecraft game, who publicly approved of the game and led the Kickstarter campaign to its success. Beta versions of the game were later shared with backers who had pledged $15 or more. Castle Story was made publicly available as a paid early access game through Steam's digital distribution platform on 23 September 2013. The game was fully released on 17 August 2017 for Linux, macOS, and Microsoft Windows, with Sauropod shifting to bugfixes and developing post-launch content.

Following the release of Castle Story, Sauropod began production on a second game, Mirador. This game had a troubled development, frequently shuffling the designer position. A Kickstarter crowdfunding campaign seeking $60,000 was not funded halfway, and Sauropod failed to find a publisher to finance the game. Instead, the Canadian Media Fund invested $900,000. As Mirador drew closer to release, it came to the studio's employees' attention that the money it had would not suffice to keep it running until the end of 2019. The game was eventually released on 26 July 2019 without prior early access availability. The idea of using early access was considered but ultimately rejected as the studio did not plan to support the game greatly post-launch. Sauropod's management assured its employees that the majority would move on to the studio's next project. However, on 23 September 2019, it was reported that Sauropod had laid off all of its 20 employees due to the foregoing money mismanagement. François Alain and Couet stated in October 2019 that Sauropod was still active, despite having laid off all staff.
