= Chief creative officer =

Corporate title

The title chief creative officer (CCO) typically describes the highest-ranking position of a creative team within a media company. Depending on the type of company, this position may be responsible for the overall look and feel of marketing, media, and branding associated with the organization. The CCO may also be charged with managing, developing, and leading one or multiple teams of creative directors, art directors, designers, and copywriters. They may also have charge over long-term planning related to intellectual property owned by the company, as in the case of Marvel Comics/Marvel Studios, DC Comics/DC Studios, or the WWE.

== Overall description ==
The CCO directs a company's creative strategy and output that drives and defines a company's brand. A CCO is often heavily involved in development cycles for consumer-facing media products, such as films, TV, or videogames. The CCO helps to craft creative decision-making and work processes to optimize for quality and consumer satisfaction. They may also serve as the primary internal champion for the needs of both creative teams and the products themselves, as opposed to other competing business interests.

== Notable chief creative officers ==
- David Filoni of Lucasfilm
- Roberto Aguirre-Sacasa of Archie Comics
- Jessica Alba of The Honest Company
- Jens Bergensten of Mojang Studios (developer of Minecraft)
- Hailey Bieber of Rhode
- Burnie Burns of Rooster Teeth Productions
- Nick Cannon of Radio Shack
- Wong Cho-lam of TVB
- Clive Davis of Sony Music Entertainment
- Pete Docter of Pixar (after Lasseter left in 2017)
- Jerma985 of Offbrand
- Kevin Feige of Marvel Entertainment
- Sarah Michelle Gellar of Foodstirs
- Hugh Hefner of Playboy Enterprises
- Alan Horn of Walt Disney Studios
- Jennifer Lee of Walt Disney Animation Studios
- Tony Khan of All Elite Wrestling
- Jared Bush of Walt Disney Animation Studios
- Jim Lee of DC Entertainment
- Seth MacFarlane of Fuzzy Door Productions
- Matthew Mercer of Critical Role
- Anthony Padilla of Smosh
- Raf Simons of Calvin Klein
- Riccardo Tisci of Burberry
- will.i.am of 3D Systems
