= Ludum Dare =

Game jam competition

New Ludum Dare logo

Old Ludum Dare logo

Ludum Dare (LD; Classical Latin: [ˈluːdũː ˈdarɛ], meaning 'to give a game', also referenced as LDJAM) is a game jam competition. It was founded by Geoff Howland and was first held in April 2002. It is currently run by Mike Kasprzak, who has been part of the team since the beginning. Participants are required to create a video game that fits within a given theme in two or three days. Participants often release a time-lapse video of the development of their game.

== History ==
Ludum Dare was originally only an Internet forum. The first competition—often referred to as "Ludum Dare Zero"—was held in April 2002, with 18 participants. Its popularity turned the focus towards the competitions rather than the forum. The time limit was subsequently increased to 48 hours, because 24 hours were decided to be too few. Since 2011 the competition has seen significant annual increases in numbers of game submissions, partly owing to the public awareness of Minecraft designer Markus Persson, who has participated seven times.

Until 2014, the event was very informal, as the Ludum Dare team worked on it in their spare time. Due to the increasing number of contestants, long-time organizer Mike Kasprzak announced in September 2014 that he would attempt at setting up a business model allowing him to work full-time on the project. Charging for Ludum Dare is, however, "out of question", and money is currently exclusively raised through donations.

During Ludum Dare 35 in April 2016, an announcement acknowledged various issues regarding the game jam's rating system. In particular, it explained that some users had attempted to artificially boost their game ratings with alternative accounts. As a consequence of this problem, future Ludum Dare events were indefinitely cancelled pending a replacement website being constructed for hosting the game jam. This led to a community backlash, and Ludum Dare 36 in August 2016 went ahead regardless, organized by website administrator and long-time community member Sorceress. Due to the complaints previously raised, the community decided by referendum to forego the game rating phase after the game jam, so no winners were named.

Starting in Ludum Dare 44, the schedule was changed to run twice per year in April and October due to organizer Mike Kasprzak struggling to keep up.

In April 2026, ahead of Ludum Dare 59, Kasprzak announced that Ludum Dare 64, in October 2028, would be the last scheduled Ludum Dare event.

== Structure ==
As of March 2023, Ludum Dare is held twice annually. In the week preceding each competition suggested themes are subject to votes by prospective participants. A theme is subsequently announced before participants are given 48 hours to create a video game (although board games or similar are accepted) that fits within it. All game code and content must be created during the competition and by a single person, and source code is encouraged to be included. During the event many participants record multiple screenshots of the development of their game to later produce a time-lapse video. In addition, many broadcast a live video stream, particularly since April 2013, when a widget showing Ludum Dare video streams hosted on Twitch was added to the Ludum Dare website. After the end of the competition participants are given three weeks to play and rate other submitted games to determine the winners. There are no physical or cash prizes, but each participant retains full ownership of their game—some have achieved financial success after developing their initial submission.

As of the 18th edition of the competition, which was held in August 2010, a more relaxed version called the "Jam" was introduced. The Jam, which allows development teams, private source code and extended development time of 72 hours, takes place concurrently with the solo competition ("Compo").

From early in the game jam's history until 2016, a smaller competition called "Mini Ludum Dare" or "MiniLD" was held during months without a main Ludum Dare competition. These were organised and run by community members with assistance from the website's various administrators and moderators. The host would choose the theme of the MiniLD, set the rules and duration, as well as prepare announcement posts throughout the event. Meanwhile, a staff member would create and manage the game submissions page, make various bookkeeping changes to the website, and generally oversee the event from behind the scenes. These MiniLDs were much more informal, and following the rules was usually optional. The themes were often more specific or technical, such as a jam focused on making games with reusable assets "Swap Shop", or making game-development tools "Tool Jam", or making a real-time-strategy games "7dRTS". Due to the popularity of hosting these smaller community-led events, a booking system was introduced, where interested persons would choose which MiniLD they wanted to host, which ended up with a two year backlog at its peak. After 70 MiniLDs, the event was retired after October 2016, much to the dismay of the community.

For several years during the 2010s, October was home to the October Challenge, which challenged people to "Finish a game, take it to market, and earn $1". Participants had 31 days to upload a link to their game to the website. The event was not competitive and was meant to encourage commercial game development from people who hadn't attempted to make money from their games previously.

== Competitions ==
No.	Month and Year	Theme (bonus)	Participants		Compo winner !		Jam winner		Ref(s).
No.	Month and Year	Theme (bonus)	Sign-ups	Submissions	Developer	Game	Developer(s)	Game	Ref(s).
0†	April 2002	Indirect interaction		18	Endurion	Magnetic Fields			
1	July 2002	Guardian	136	46	Hamumu	Scarecrow: Heart of Straw			
1.5‡	September 2002	N/A		12					
2	November 2002	Construction/destruction (sheep)	116	49	ShredWheat	Sheep Town			
3	April 2003	Preparation – Set it up, let it go	84						
4	April 2004	Infection	341	66	randomnine	Commies!			
5	October 2004	Random	93		Jolle	Random Dungeon Exploration			
6	April 2005	Light and darkness	143	52	Jolle	Uplighter			
7	December 2005	Growth		27	Jolle	The People			
8	April 2006	Swarms	150	66					
8.5†‡	January 2007	Moon/anti-text							
9	April 2007	Build the level you play			DrPetter	Spatzap aka N/A			
10	December 2007	Chain reaction	158	51	Hamumu	Short Fuse			
10.5‡	February 2008	Weird/unexpected/surprise							
11	April 2008	Minimalist		71	mrfun/SethR	Strong AI			
12	August 2008	The tower (owls)		57	Hamumu	Rise Of The Owls			
13	December 2008	Roads		59	increpare	Rara Racer			
14	April 2009	Advancing wall of doom		123	mrfun/SethR	Mind Wall			
15	August 2009	Caverns		144	ChevyRay	Beacon			
16	December 2009	Exploration		121	sylvie	Cat Planet			
17	April 2010	Islands		204	xerus	Gaiadi			
18	August 2010	Enemies as weapons		172	invicticide	Fail-Deadly			
19	December 2010	Discovery		242	deepnight (Sébastien Bénard)	Time Pygmy			
20	April 2011	It's dangerous to go alone! Take this!		288	deepnight (Sébastien Bénard)	Appy 1000mg			
21	August 2011	Escape		599	Chevy Ray Johnston	Flee Buster	Ian Brock; Josh Schonstal; Guerin McMurry	Escape	
22	December 2011	Alone (kitten challenge)		891	Pedro Medeiros	Frostbite	Harry Lee; Jarrel Seah	Midas	
23	April 2012	Tiny world		1402	Tyler Glaiel	Fracuum	TurboDindon	Inside My Radio	
24	August 2012	Evolution		1406	Nicolas Cannasse	Evoland	X-0ut	LD24 X0ut	
25	December 2012	You are the villain (goat)		1327	deepnight (Sébastien Bénard)	Atomic Creep Spawner	Free Lives	Ore Chasm	
26	April 2013	Minimalism (potato)		2346	TimTipGames	MONO	Mark Foster; David Fenn	Leaf Me Alone	
27	August 2013	10 seconds		2213	Andrew Shouldice	Probe Team	Graeme Borland	NXTWPN10	
28	December 2013	You only get one		2064	Daniël Haazen	One Take	Mark Foster; David Fenn; Andrew Gleeson	Titan Souls	
29	April 2014	Beneath the surface		2497	Daniel Linssen	The Sun and Moon	Shannon Mason; Richard Lems; Diane de Wilde	ScubaBear	
30	August 2014	Connected Worlds		2538	PixelMind	SuperDimensional	Kevin Zuhn; Kevin Geisler; Chris Stallman; Devon Scott-Tunkin	Antbassador	
31	December 2014	Entire Game on One Screen		2637	Daniel Linssen	birdsong	Simon Larsen; Lukas Hansen; Frederik Storm	90 Second Portraits	
32	April 2015	An Unconventional Weapon		2821	01010111	BED✰HOGG	Bogdan Rybak; Igor Puzhevich; Zi Ye; Megan Alcock	The Rock the Paper and the Scissors	
33	August 2015	You are the Monster		2725	DragonXVI	Writhe: The Thing from the Omega Sector	Pietro Ferrantelli; Theophile Loaec; Augustin Grassien; OrikMcFly	Mobs, Inc.	
34	December 2015	Growing/two button controls		2870	vegapomme27	Frank & Stein	Big Green Pillow ft Mgaia	Slash Quest	
35	April 2016	Shapeshift		2718	Daniel Linssen	windowframe	Barney Cumming; Dave Lloyd; Jon Murphy; Paul Dal Pozzo; Louis Meyer; Adrian Vaughan	The Maitre D	
36‡	August 2016	Ancient Technology	N/A	1912	No ratings	N/A	No ratings	N/A	
37	December 2016	One Room	N/A	2390	Daniel Linssen	Walkie Talkie	Three-Way Tie		
37	December 2016	One Room	N/A	2390	Daniel Linssen	Walkie Talkie	SinclairStrange	Cancelled Refuge	
37	December 2016	One Room	N/A	2390	Daniel Linssen	Walkie Talkie	dustyroom	Empty	
37	December 2016	One Room	N/A	2390	Daniel Linssen	Walkie Talkie	Pietro Ferrantelli	Xenopunch	
38	April 2017	A Small World	5065	2980	impbox	Smalltrek	David Fu; Hamdan Javeed; Seikun Kambashi	Honey Home	
39	July 2017	Running out of Power	5423	2355	Jezzamon	VUEL	Linver; Ice King	Apocalyptic Gamer	
40	December 2017	The more you have, the worse it is	6175	2889	stevenjmiller	Permanence	DDRKirbyISQ Xellaya	Samurai Shaver	
41	April 2018	Combine two incompatible genres	6827	3049	lukbebalduke	DUNK EM UP!	Pietro Ferrantelli; Sylvain Guerrero; Robin Chafouin; Joachim Leclerc; Boris Warembourg	Dark Soil	
42	August 2018	Running out of space	6405	3065	Goutye	Reverse	Jonathan Murphy; Louis Meyer; Adrian Vaughan; Kyle Olson; Angelo Di Rosa; Ben Weatherall Dave Lloyd	The Not Very Golden Age of Piracy	
43	December 2018	Sacrifices must be made	5611	2515	adventureislands	Total Party Kill	Hydezeke	F R I E N D G U N	
44	April 2019	Your life is currency	7855	2536	Skoggy	Oink Royale	CosmicAdventureSquad rosypenguin Strega tenlki	Coin-Op Kid	
45	October 2019	Start with nothing	5838	2612	Joe Williamson	World Collector	Sheepolution	Lost in Translation	
46	April 2020	Keep it alive	10330	4959	Daniel Mullins	Keep It Alive	Ismael Rodriguez	Keep It Alive	
47	October 2020	Stuck in a loop	6662	3206	ZakAmana	GLITCH LOOP	Pedro Medeiros	Chamber	
48	April 2021	Deeper and Deeper	7881	3866	thegreenworm	ROOTS	logan	Fallumns	
49	October 2021	Unstable	5805	2939	thetatautau	Quantum Splitter	sinclairstrange	Burning Ravager	
50	April 2022	Delay the inevitable	5994	2900	Antti Haavikko	Claustrowordia	TRASEVOL_DOG; Pentadrangle benjamin	Shotgun King: the Final Checkmate	
51	October 2022	Every 10 seconds	4887	2414	Antti Haavikko	The Sandwicher	anstabo	Dark Points	
52	January 2023	Harvest	4342	1632	Daniel Mullins	Boba	Xellaya; DDRKirbyISQ	A Day in the Life of Death	
53	April 2023	Delivery	5993	2309	Seb_gamedev	Rhino Express	Pedro Medeiros; Isadora Rodopoulos; Davey Wreden; Ryan Roth	Neo City Express	
54	September 2023	Limited space	4004	2165	Jeremy Ryan	Hope Falters	Ollie Powell; Tom Carrell; Adam Butcher; Ezgi Hazal Aygan	Stretchmancer	
55	April 2024	Summoning	4522	2194	Daniel Mullins	Voir Dire	GuyUnger	Would you still love me if I was a worm	
55	April 2024	Summoning	4522	2194	Daniel Mullins	Voir Dire	Joe Bustamante	Would you still love me if I was a worm	
55	April 2024	Summoning	4522	2194	Daniel Mullins	Voir Dire	TheWizardToucan	Would you still love me if I was a worm	
55	April 2024	Summoning	4522	2194	Daniel Mullins	Voir Dire	Daisy Games	Would you still love me if I was a worm	
55	April 2024	Summoning	4522	2194	Daniel Mullins	Voir Dire	LucyLavend	Would you still love me if I was a worm	
55	April 2024	Summoning	4522	2194	Daniel Mullins	Voir Dire	samsface	Would you still love me if I was a worm	
56	October 2024	Tiny Creatures	4182	1929	Jeremy Ryan	My Keyboard is Full of Ants!	superjai	Bento Bugs	
56	October 2024	Tiny Creatures	4182	1929	Jeremy Ryan	My Keyboard is Full of Ants!	Jake G	Bento Bugs	
56	October 2024	Tiny Creatures	4182	1929	Jeremy Ryan	My Keyboard is Full of Ants!	Doraemon	Bento Bugs	
56	October 2024	Tiny Creatures	4182	1929	Jeremy Ryan	My Keyboard is Full of Ants!	Kidabra	Bento Bugs	
57	April 2025	Depths	3262	1600	Yorsh	An Angler's Light	sinclairstrange	Abyss Vaulter	
58	October 2025	Collector	2929	1387	Hayden McCraw	Idle Badger	shores	Cut to Pieces	
58	October 2025	Collector	2929	1387	Hayden McCraw	Idle Badger	invisionMusic	Cut to Pieces	
58	October 2025	Collector	2929	1387	Hayden McCraw	Idle Badger	Sheepolution	Cut to Pieces	
59	April 2026	Signal	3004	1609	ble	Boba's Love Story	KenForest	Signal Garden	
60	October 2026	Old Tech (elephant)	1661	945	Jeremy Ryan	Lexi Chameleon	Alexascher	Light Seeker	
60	October 2026	Old Tech (elephant)	1661	945	Jeremy Ryan	Lexi Chameleon	ingi	Light Seeker	

Notes:

- † — Competitions were held for only 24 hours.
- ‡ — Competition was run without ratings.

== Notable games ==
The following games originated from submissions to Ludum Dare:

- Broforce
- DMCA's Sky
- Dome Keeper
- Evoland
- Friday Night Funkin'
- Galcon
- Gods Will Be Watching
- Hollow Knight
- Inscryption
- Inside My Radio
- Loop Hero
- McPixel
- Mini Metro
- Minicraft
- Octogeddon
- Pony Island
- Pretentious Game
- The Republia Times
- Shotgun King: The Final Checkmate
- Snakebird
- Sneaky Sasquatch
- Snowden Run 3D
- Titan Souls
- Vox
