= WASD =

WASD may refer to:

- Wallenpaupack Area School District
- WASD keys, the default mapping in most video games along with space, and shift which are used for the movement for the player using a keyboard
- Wide Area Surveillance Division, a VMS web server
- Cobalt WASD, a game by Mojang Studios
