= Ravenmark: Scourge of Estellion =

2011 video game

- Developer: Witching Hour Studios
- Publisher: Witching Hour Studios
- Designers: Ian Gregory Tan; Brian Kwek
- Composer: Josh Whelchel
- Platforms: iOS; Microsoft Windows; Android
- Release: November 11, 2011
- Genre: Turn-based strategy

Ravenmark: Scourge of Estellion is a turn-based strategy video game developed and published by the Singaporean studio Witching Hour Studios. Released on November 11, 2011, for iOS, Ravenmark: Scourge of Estellion is presented in a top-down isometric view and backed by hand-painted 2D maps. Set in the world of Eclisse, the game has expanded to encompass four complete mission campaigns, excluding the prelude campaign available on the free downloadable app. Ravenmark: Scourge of Estellion is seen as a "comprehensive turn-based strategy game" and is a recommended title for the iOS strategy gamer. The game currently features an average score of 85/100 on Metacritic.

== Plot ==
The story of Ravenmark delves into the tribulations suffered by the dominant Empire of Estellion following the death of its beloved Emperor, Sergius Corvius. Faced with a power struggle stirring from within, the Empire is quickly engulfed in chaos when the vengeful mystics of Kaysan invade the territories of Estellion and its neighboring nations within the world of Eclisse.

Through the different story campaigns, players follow the perspectives of commanders from each nation involved in the conflict. The campaigns of Estellion follow the bookish, mild-mannered Calius Septim and his mentor, the great general Vidius Harper, while the Kaysani campaign features the maniacal machinations of Alejo de Porres.

== Gameplay ==
Players issue commands to units on a map grid to achieve the mission objective, usually in the form of defeating the opposition. They also control commanders – typically the portrayed protagonists – who are attached to the player’s given units, and may provide these units with special attacks, auras, and healing spells. Emphasis is placed on strategic movement, often requiring players to make use of formations: a mechanic allowing players to combine similar units together for bonus effects.

While the game resembles typical strategy role-playing games comparable to the likes of Fire Emblem or Super Robot Wars, units and heroes do not gain experience points to level up or gain new talents and superior combat. Players experience the game's plot via scripted cutscenes and dialogue.

=== Combat ===
Each turn in the game is divided into two distinct phases. Players issue up to six command points during the Command Phase. In missions where the player controls multiple factions, six more command points are granted per additional faction. Once all commands have been issued, the Battle Phase occurs. During this phase, all units and formations make their moves as assigned by the player and the AI. The order in which units move is decided by their initiative value. A higher Initiative awards the unit’s action with higher priority during the Battle Phase. Faster units, such as cavalry, move first on the table of units. A tiebreaker roll decides which of the similar units moves first.

When all units have completed their commands, the turn ends and the next Command Phase commences.

=== Units ===
Units in Ravenmark are also known as Elements. All elements are classified into one of five types - infantry, ranged, cavalry, polearms and support. Each element type has a damage advantage on another type, and less support elements are neutral to all other element types. Infantry deals more damage to polearm elements, while polearm elements deal more damage to cavalry. Cavalry deals more damage to ranged elements and ranged elements deal more damage to infantry. Certain units such as mounted archers are classified as ranged elements and not cavalry.

In addition to element advantage, each element type often features abilities that significantly boost its presumptive role. Earthbound Swordsmen for example, gain the passive Lock Shields ability when in a deuce, allowing them to mitigate damage taken.

=== Formations ===
Similar elements standing to each other may optionally combine into Formations. A single element is referred to as a Dagger, while a formation consisting of two elements is called a Deuce. The largest formation possible, a Trine, consists of three elements of the same type. Elements such as the Cardani Dartelves occupy a two-by-two grid space and are referred to as Swarms. Naturally, swarms are not allowed to break or form formations.

Deuce and trine formations often gain formation bonuses and additional abilities over daggers. However, this comes at the cost of having reduced maneuverability and increased vulnerability to flanking. As such, players must break and create formations based on circumstance. Breaking and creating formations do not cost command points.

== Reception ==
Reception

Aggregate score
Aggregator	Score
Metacritic	85%

Review scores
Publication	Score
TouchArcade	4.5/5
Pocket Gamer	7/10
AppSpy	4/5
Tap!	5/5

Upon its release, Ravenmark: Scourge of Estellion received acclaim from the strategy communities, in particular, the turn-based strategy community. Tap! UK Magazine praised the depth of the world of Eclisse where Ravenmark is set, citing how “[Witching Hour] have crafted their own epic world” and referenced it to “deep, Middle Earthy stuff”. Pocket Gamer lauded the developers for “aiming to compete with the big boys - Fire Emblem, Final Fantasy Tactics - and not falling too far short”.

Ravenmark's gameplay is almost universally commended, albeit being regarded as having a steep learning curve. Kotaku reviewed that the strategy title is “deep and well-rounded”. Many reviews also highlighted the game’s pedigree of challenge. Andrew Nesvadba of AppSpy noted how “the game's difficulty is... firmly in the region of that suited to genre veterans”.
