= Vox (video game) =

2012 video game

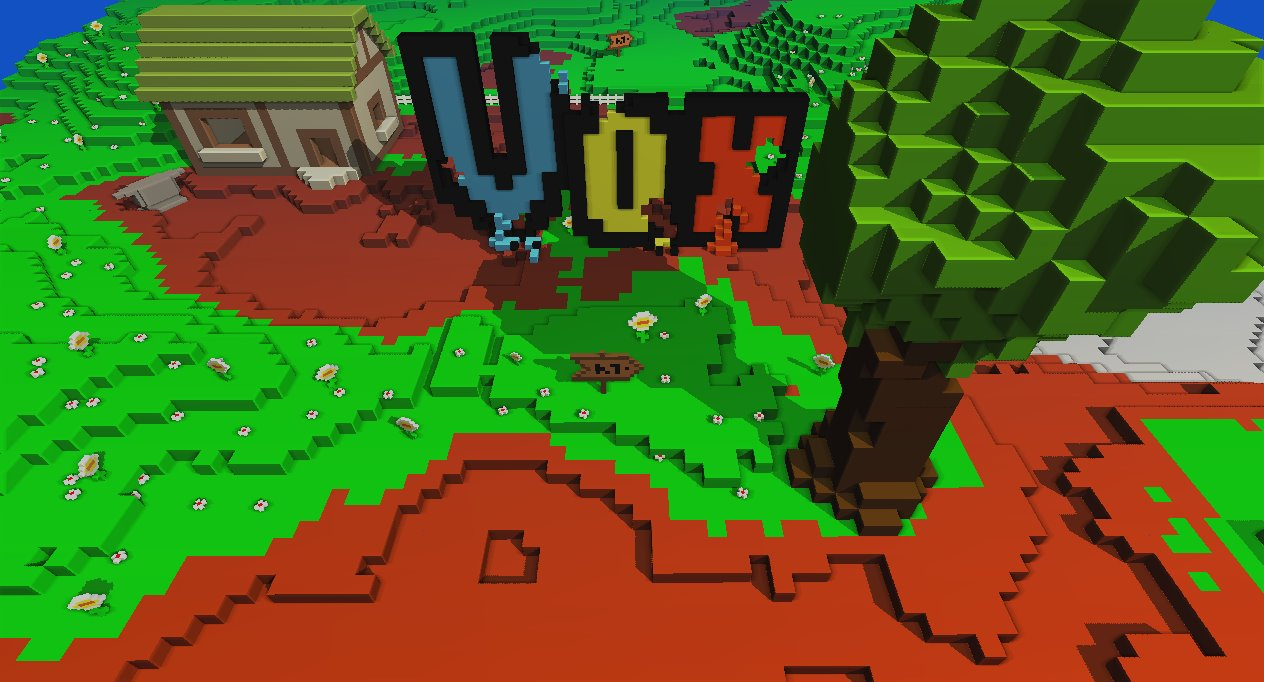
- Logo
- Developer: AlwaysGeeky Games
- Initial release: 8 September 2012; 13 years ago
- Stable release: 0.16 / 22 March 2017; 9 years ago
- Operating system: Microsoft Windows (Linux, MacOS versions on GitHub)
- Platform: PC
- Type: Single-player, multiplayer Adventure, role-playing
- License: GPLv3
- Website: www.vox-game.com (archived 2015)
- Repository: github.com/AlwaysGeeky/Vox

Vox is an independent voxel-based adventure and role-playing video game developed by Canadian studio AlwaysGeeky Games.

== Gameplay ==
Vox is an adventure and creation game created using a voxel and block based aesthetic. Vox focuses on player created content, and allows the player to customize every aspect of the game.

Players can create their own custom characters, weapons, items, monsters, NPCs and everything else in the game. Since everything in the game is made up of voxels, everything can be edited and customized using the same interface. The editors and tools that allow for creation of voxel objects and sprites are part of the game and built into the gameplay of the game. This allows Vox to further enhance the gameplay of other voxel based games, that only allow modification to the voxel world.

Vox features a dynamic world that is populated with many interactive elements, such as monsters and NPC villages and would have had a full story and adventure mode. This mode would have also featured a dynamic quest system.

== History ==
=== Development ===
Originally, Vox started as an entry into the Ludum Dare #23 competition, named "When Worlds Collide", with the source code and game prototype available for download. The core voxel engine technology was created over the course of the two day Ludum Dare Weekend. Later the development was documented openly on a website titled "Let's make a voxel engine". Vox was developed using an incremental release model and as new features and elements are added to the game, these are gradually released in updates. The latest available public demo version distributed via IndieDB is v0.28.

=== Releases ===
Vox was first commercially released on digital distributor Desura on 8 September 2012 as playable Pre-alpha release version. In Jun 2013 the game was released via Humble Store. On 12 November 2013 the game was also successfully Steam Greenlighted as "Early access" game.

=== Open-source ===
Around end of 2015 the source code of Vox was made available as open-source software under the GPLv3 on GitHub. Cross-platform support via CMake for Linux and MacOS was added. There was development activity on the repository until 2017 by AlwaysGeeky Games. The repository has since been taken down.

=== Fate ===
As of April 2023, the game has not received an update since 2017. While it is still listed as early access, it is no longer available for purchase on Steam. AlwaysGeeky Games has moved on to create Voxie Tactics, a similar, NFT-based game.

== Reception ==
As of November 2018, the game has received mostly negative reviews from Steam users. In January 2017 Steam Spy guessed, based on available data, around 20,000 owners.

== See also ==
- Minecraft
- Terraria
