= Minicraft =

2011 video game

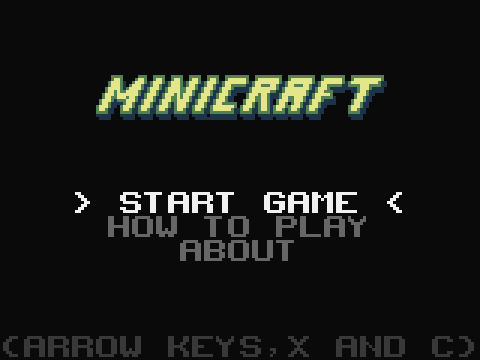
- Title screen of the original game
- Designer: Markus Persson
- Platform: Java applet
- Release: December 19, 2011
- Genres: Action, survival
- Mode: Single-player

Minicraft is a 2D top-down action game designed and programmed by Markus Persson, the creator of Minecraft, for the 22nd Ludum Dare, a 48-hour game programming competition. The game was released on December 19, 2011.

== Gameplay ==
Similar to Minecraft, the player roams a world and must find resources, fight enemies, and build a home. The goal of the game is to kill the Air Wizard, the boss of the game. It is also stated in the official description, in line with the theme, that "the goal of the game is to kill the only other sentient being in the world, making sure you’ll be alone forever". The game is set in a top down perspective, and according to Alec Meer from Rock, Paper, Shotgun – the game has a touch of Zelda to it.

== Development ==
Minicraft was developed by Minecraft creator Markus Persson in 48 hours as a part of the 22nd Ludum Dare competition, which requires game developers that enter the contest to make a game in 48 hours based on a theme that is released just before the time starts. For this Ludum Dare, the theme was "Alone". During the 48 hours, Persson also livestreamed his coding of the game and made blog entries on the Ludum Dare website for significant milestones he reached. Minicraft competed against 891 other games, with the judging based on nine categories, some of which include "innovation, fun, graphics, audio, humor and mood". The voting for best game was determined by the Ludum Dare community and the time for voting ended on January 9, 2012.

=== Sequel ===
Persson tweeted on December 26, 2011, that he was working on Minicraft 2, but planned to change that interim title. When asked what type of direction the game would be going in, Persson responded, "action roguelike with crafting and modifiable terrain." On January 1, 2012, Persson announced via Twitter that the new title for the sequel to Minicraft was to be MiniTale. He also obtained "the .com and .net" URLs with the title to host the game on.

=== Minicraft+ ===
Persson released the source code under Ludum Dare's rules, but under no license. Instead he asked that players modding the game call it something else. Over the weeks that followed many mods came out for the game, but seeing that Persson had moved on to other projects, Minicraft+ was born. Minicraft+ is a modded version of Minicraft that adds many more features to the original version.

== Reception ==
The game was commonly likened to the early The Legend of Zelda games, with reviewers like Rock, Paper, Shotgun writer Alec Meer adding, "It's a good (and compulsive) time, and impressively complete for a mere 48 hours of crunch".

Boing Boing reviewer Rob Beschizza critiqued the game saying, "A spectacular achievement in just a few hours of coding, Minicraft casts the same spell as the real thing. It does, however, suffer from shallowness and grind. There's not much to do except plow through the process of emptying each level in search of better ores."

VentureBeat writer Dan Crawley commented on the gathering system, saying, "A simple but addictive approach to resource gathering helps give the game a whimsical charm not a million miles from that of its big brother."

Matt Bradford of GamesRadar stated that, "The project is about as basic as one can expect from a marathon coding competition, but the mere fact it's actually a solid, playable game is a testament to Persson's skill", and also pointed out that; "No doubt, this could easily be a discount app for iOS or a PS Mini."
