= Inside My Radio =

2015 video game

- Developer: Seaven Studio
- Publisher: Iceberg Interactive
- Platforms: Windows; PlayStation 4; Xbox One; Wii U; Switch
- Release: Windows, PS4; 11 May 2015; Xbox One; 15 September 2015; Wii U; 25 February 2016; Switch; 10 January 2019
- Genres: Rhythm, platform
- Mode: Single-player

Inside My Radio is a rhythm platform game developed by French independent video game developer Seaven Studio and published by Iceberg Interactive. The prototype was made by TurboDindon during Ludum Dare #23, a video game development competition, where it won both the Overall and Audio prizes in the Jam category. Seaven Studio and TurboDindon have continued development in order to release Inside My Radio on Windows, Xbox One and PlayStation 4. On 10 January 2019, the game was released for the Nintendo Switch.

== Reception ==
Reception

Aggregate score
Aggregator	Score
Metacritic	68/100

The game has a score of 68% on Metacritic.
