= Titan Souls =

2015 action-adventure game

- Developer: Acid Nerve
- Publisher: Devolver Digital
- Designers: Mark Foster; Andrew Gleeson
- Programmer: Mark Foster
- Artist: Andrew Gleeson
- Writers: Mark Foster; David Fenn; Andrew Gleeson
- Composer: David Fenn
- Platforms: Windows, OS X, PlayStation 4, PlayStation Vita, Android
- Release: Windows, OS X, PS4, PS Vita; 14 April 2015; Android; 30 June 2015
- Genre: Action-adventure
- Mode: Single-player

Titan Souls is a 2015 action-adventure game developed by Acid Nerve and published by Devolver Digital. It was released for Windows, OS X, PlayStation 4, PlayStation Vita, and Android. Titan Souls received generally positive reviews and has been cited as an early example of a Soulslike, a game genre directly inspired by the Dark Souls series. A sequel, Death's Door, was released on November 23, 2021 for the Nintendo Switch, PlayStation 4 and PlayStation 5 then later released July 20, 2021 for Windows, Xbox One, and Xbox Series X.

== Plot ==
Between Earth and the real world beyond lie the Titan Souls, the spiritual source and sum of all living things. Now scattered amongst the ruins and guarded by the idle titans charged with their care, a solitary hero armed with but a single arrow is once again assembling shards of the Titan Soul in a quest for truth and power.

== Gameplay ==
Gameplay screenshot

Titan Souls is a strategic, open world, 2D, top-down action-adventure, where the player has only one arrow and can only take one hit. The goal is to defeat the twenty giant monsters (twenty-one on hard mode) called the Titans, which can, just like the player, only take one hit but only have one way to be defeated. During the fight, the player has to figure out how the respective boss behaves and by that find a way to defeat that boss. The difficulty is that the single arrow has to be charged to be shot and afterwards has to be retrieved to be reused, each action only able to be done while the player is standing still, making them an easy target for the bosses.

== Development ==
Titan Souls draws inspiration from influences such as Dark Souls, Shadow of the Colossus and The Legend of Zelda. The game was originally created for the Ludum Dare Game Jam #28 as TITAN SOULS, uploaded under the username Claw. The game placed first in the categories "Overall (Jam)", "Audio (Jam)" and "Mood (Jam)". Over the course of six months, the game was ported from Adobe Flash to its new engine, enhancing graphics and improving performance, adding a new soundtrack and expanding the game from three to sixteen titans. In June 2014, Titan Souls was shown at E3 2014, revealing that the game will be published by Devolver Digital. After E3, the game was expanded further with three additional titans and a story. On 25 March 2015, Devolver Digital revealed that Titan Souls will be released on 14 April 2015. On 2 April 2015, the Game Jam prototype was remade in the new engine, adding better graphics, an improved soundtrack and new bosses, and a demo was made available before the full game release. The game was ported to PlayStation 4 and PlayStation Vita by Abstraction Games. The game was released on 14 April 2015. Abstraction Games later announced that an Android port was also underway, which released 30 June 2015.

== Reception ==
Reception

Aggregate score
Aggregator	Score
Metacritic	PC: 74/100; PS4: 73/100; VITA: 74/100

Review scores
Publication	Score
Destructoid	8/10
Game Informer	8.5/10
GameSpot	7/10
GameTrailers	7/10
IGN	8/10
PC Gamer (US)	87/100
Polygon	6.5/10
VideoGamer.com	8/10

Titan Souls received generally positive reviews. It received a score of 74/100 on Metacritic.

Tim Turi from Game Informer gave the game an 8.5/10, praising the simple control, as well as the huge variety of bosses featured, high replay value, as well as the attractive and captivating atmosphere and environmental-design and the extra challenges for extending the longevity of the game. The inspiring boss-design is also praised. He also praised the music featured in the game, calling it "a clever contrast to the pulse-pounding boss tunes" However, he noted that patience is needed in enjoying the game because the player will die very often in a playthrough. He summarized the review by calling a top down game with "Zelda-style battles against a large gallery of tough bosses in the vein of Shadow of the Colossus."

Tom Orry from VideoGamer.com gave the game an 8/10, praising the game's artistic visuals, challenging and quality boss battles, rewarding gameplay, as well as the game's emphasis on skill. However, he noted that the game can be frustrating to play and that the limited world and exploration and the lack of an instant respawn option has dragged the game down. He summarized the review by calling the game "a unique and memorable experience" and stated that the game is one of the most interesting titles he has played in 2015.

Brandin Tyrrel from IGN gave the game an 8/10, while praising the game's checkpoint system, which saves the game from being tedious, as well as the endearing 16-bit art-style, responsive control and creative boss battles, he criticized the game for having generic and boring environmental design and for lacking randomization, which lowers the replay value. Arthur Gies from Polygon is much more negative about the game, calling the boss-fights anticlimactic, as well as criticizing the game's empty world, "gibberish" boss description, basic puzzles and the control for being overly-simplistic. He also criticized the game boss battles for encouraging a repetitive pattern in defeating bosses.

The game was review bombed in April 2015 by supporters of the game critic TotalBiscuit after the game's artist Andrew Gleeson mocked a statement that he made saying the game was not for him. TotalBiscuit, in a following podcast, stated that the developer had it out for him, leading several of his followers to review bomb the game, though Bain later expressed that he did not endorse such behavior.
