= The Spirit Engine 2 =

2008 video game

- Logo of The Spirit Engine 2 featuring a symbolic dragon-like figure
- Developer: Natomic Studios
- Designer: Mark Pay
- Composer: Josh Whelchel
- Platform: Microsoft Windows
- Release: July 30, 2008
- Genre: Role-playing video game
- Mode: Single-player

The Spirit Engine 2 is a 2008 two-dimensional, side-scrolling indie RPG drawn, programmed and written by Mark Pay with music by Josh Whelchel. The title is an improved spiritual sequel to The Spirit Engine, a freeware 2D RPG released in 2003.

== Gameplay ==
The player's party (left) battling a group of enemies (right).

Outside of combat, the player can move the party along sidescrolling levels, speaking to NPCs and obtaining missions, purchasing or selling items to equip on characters, and moving between areas. Enemy encounters are not random, although enemy type is sometimes randomized. Special statues function as save points.

The Spirit Engine 2's battle system takes place in real time, and characters attack automatically. Battle speed may be sped up, slowed down, or paused. The game removes the mana mechanic of The Spirit Engine that allowed for a limited number of attacks before needing to recharge, and players' actions can be paused to build up extra attack power or wait for an opening. The two teams form lines on either side of the screen. On one side is the player's three characters, on the other side are the enemies currently being fought. The player can rotate the three party members: changing who is in front, in the middle, and in the back. Melee attacks cause characters to change positions, potentially becoming vulnerable, while ranged attacks can strike back row, or multiple characters. Party members have "damage multipliers" which rise as the number of continuous hits sustained increases and vice versa. Characters, both player and enemy, are automatically revived after a certain amount of time with decreased health. All health is restored between battles.

Each combatant has a unique set of skills that they can draw from. Unlike the "regular actions" of The Spirit Engine, skills must be used at all times, and consist of four damage types. "Skill chains" can be formed for each player, or for the entire party, before battle takes place, and allow a number of skills to be used in sequence depending on the situation. The player characters’ actions begin relatively weak, but can be improved by investing skill points. When the player's party gains enough experience through defeating enemies, it will gain a level. Higher level parties have more powerful actions in general, however each individual character gains one skill point when the party increases in level. These skill points allow the player to specialize their party members. Skills can only be increased up to a quarter of the party level, and higher level skills are boosted less per skill point. Characters also gain "refund points" which can be used to free previously assigned skill points.

== Plot ==
The player can initially choose from a grid of nine different party members, with three per class and personality type. While the party members can occupy any class (knight, musketeer, or priest), one of each personality type (antihero, naive, and logical) is needed. Each party member has unique dialogue and plot-related events due to their differing backstories.

The game takes place in Lereftain, a country under a tenuous peace treaty with the neighboring nation of Yaegara. The continent of Medea is ruled over by the tentacled, psychic Rakari, who are accepted by most humans, including the Lereftese Parliament, but held in suspicion by some due to their mysterious motives. The Rakari also function as a peacekeeping force by removing criminals from the population and rehabilitating them. The three characters are brought together after witnessing an unexplained murder by a cult called the Keepers, and set out to discover the Keepers' motives. In the process, they discover a plot of political intrigue that threatens to send the two countries to war.

== Development ==
The game was drawn, programmed and written by Mark Pay. Its soundtrack was composed by Josh Whelchel and sold in a four-disc set on his website. In February 2010, the game was released as freeware.

== Reception ==
The Spirit Engine 2 won the GameTunnel "Top Independent RPG of 2008" and "#2 Independent Game of 2008" awards. GameTunnel's Michael Scarpelli praised the two-dimensional game as "a side-scrolling, pixel graphic, content-heavy piece of awesome." It received an 89/100 from RPGFan's Patrick Gann, who called it "tons of fun" and "so far removed from the quality of its predecessor that it deserves to be paid for. TIGSource's Derek Yu commented that it "improves on the original in almost every way". Rock, Paper, Shotgun's Kieron Gillen called the game "delectable and novel", believing that the game would attract "non-traditional jRPG fans" despite the "linear story" due to the different character permutations. Gillen called the game's literalization of linearity "appealing", expressing his disappointment that Pay did not attempt to market the game more.
