= Code Club AB =

Swedish video game developer

- Formerly: Mojang Specifications AB; (2007); Onetoofree AB; (2007–2011)
- Type: Private
- Industry: Video games
- Founded: 14 May 2007; 19 years ago
- Founders: Rolf Jansson; Markus Persson
- Headquarters: Motala, Sweden
- Key people: Rolf Jansson (CEO)
- Products: Wurm Online
- Parent: Game Chest (2019–present)
- Website: codeclub.se

Code Club AB is a Swedish video game developer based in Motala. The company was founded by Rolf Jansson and Markus Persson in 2007, and was formerly known as Mojang Specifications AB and Onetoofree AB. Code Club developed Wurm Online, a massively multiplayer online sandbox game; and its successor, Wurm Unlimited.

== History ==
Code Club AB was founded as Mojang Specifications AB by Swedish video game designers Rolf Jansson and Markus Persson on 14 May 2007, as their game, Wurm Online, began to turn a profit. Later in 2007, Markus Persson stepped out of the project and left the company. However, he wished to retain the "Mojang" name for himself, leading Jansson to rename the company Onetoofree AB. Jansson had issues explaining the name to others without having to spell it out, so the company assumed a new name, Code Club AB, in October 2011. On 8 July 2019, Stockholm-based Game Chest acquired 82.9% of Code Club for 3.37 million kr (US$335,000), of which 1.5 million kr in cash and 1.87 million kr in newly issued Game Chest shares.

== Games developed ==
Year	Title	Platform(s)	Publisher(s)
2012	Wurm Online	Linux, macOS, Microsoft Windows	Code Club AB
2015	Wurm Unlimited	Linux, Microsoft Windows	Plug In Digital
