= Snowden Run 3D =

2013 video game

- Developer: Michele Rocco Smeets
- Publisher: MTS Freestyle
- Platforms: Android, PC, Mac
- Release: July 2013
- Genre: Endless runner
- Mode: Single player

Snowden Run 3D is an endless runner video game created by Belgian computer programmer Michele Rocco Smeets. The program was released in July 2013 for Android operating systems, PC, and Mac computers. The game is very loosely based on NSA whistleblower Edward Snowden.

== Gameplay ==
Snowden Run 3D plays as a free-to-play endless runner. Played in a behind the back, third person viewpoint, "Snowden" automatically runs forward, and the player must direct Snowden through the levels with swiping motions using a touch screen, to avoid obstacles and collect certain items. Specifically, the player is to direct Snowden into USB sticks and laptops in order to collect "sensitive information", while trying to avoid "Agent Jake", who chases after Snowden with the intent of imprisoning him. The player at times also has the option to call "Uncle Putin" on a cell phone, who will drop a hydrogen bomb on the location, which helps clear a path and further the distance between Snowden and Agent Jake.

The game contains three different randomly generated levels; NSA Headquarters, Hong Kong and Moscow Sheremetyevo Airport. The levels play out infinitely, with no way to win or finish. Upon inevitably being captured, Snowden is captured and sent to Guantanamo Bay, where the game ends.

The game's soundtrack features music from Peruvian born American rapper and social activist Immortal Technique.

== Development ==
The game was developed by programmer Michele Rocco Smeets, who states that the game took only 30 hours of development time. Smeets had noted how many spinoffs of Temple Run existed on the Google Play and iOS App Store, and was inspired to attempt to create one of his own. In early planning stages, at one point, he imagined the game as being more in the vein of a traditional platform game, such as Super Mario Bros., but eventually felt that the constant running of an endless runner was more appropriate and symbolic of the nature of Edward Snowden and the NSA. The game was originally intended as a Ludum Dare entry, an accelerated video game development contest. Smeets states that the game is meant to be a neutral and unbiased parody of Edward Snowden's involvement in the Global surveillance disclosures of 2013, and was not made out of any political motivation or affiliation.

A version of the game for iOS has been announced, but has not been released or given a release date.

== Reception ==
Reception for the game was generally mixed. GameZone criticized the game for being difficult and buggy, but overall advocated at least giving the game a try as "amusing way to pass time", and compared it favorably to Hudson Soft's Adventure Island video game from the 1980s. Kotaku was less enthusiastic, referring to the game as "pretty awful".
