= Josh Whelchel =

Josh Whechel
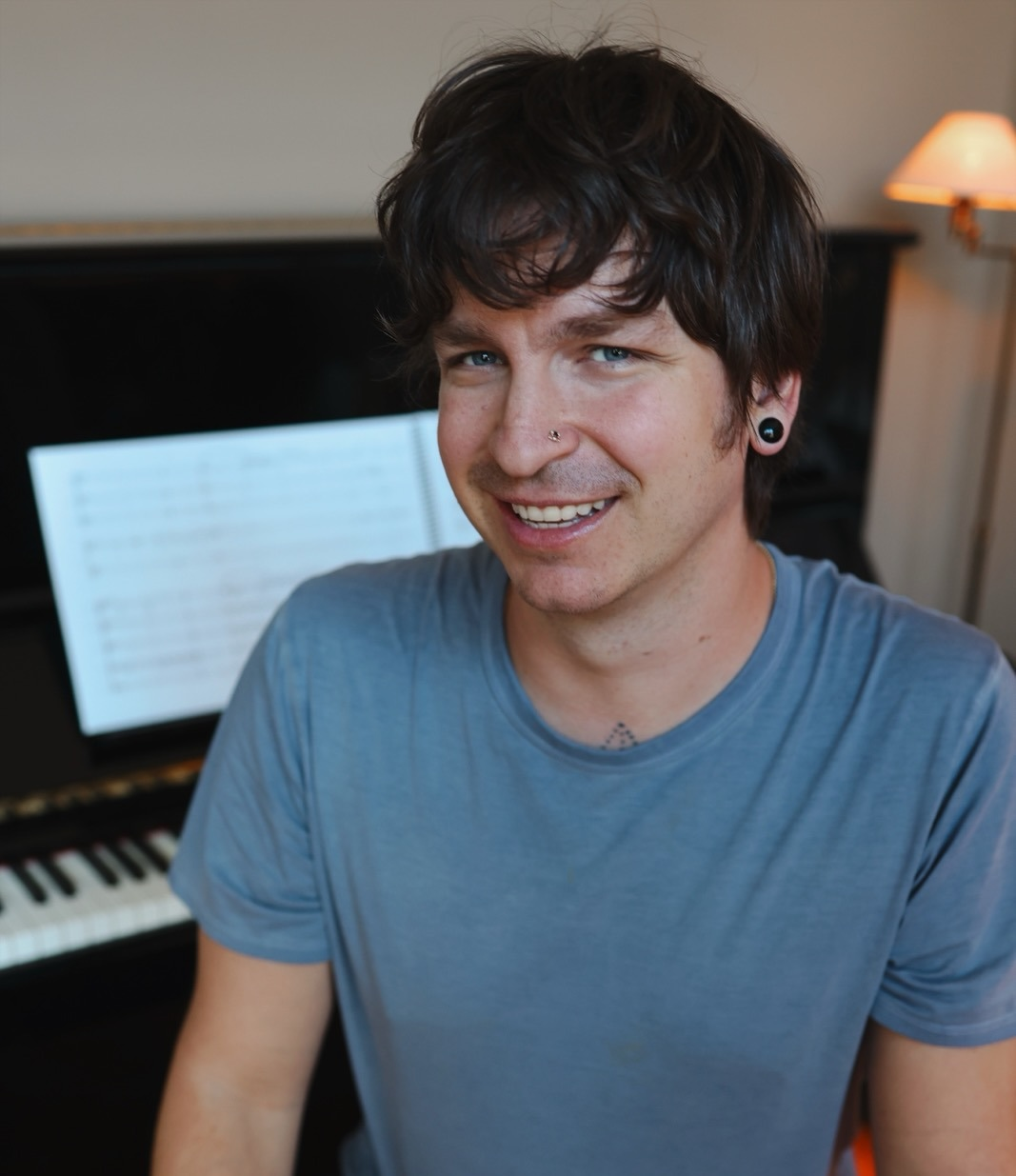
- Whelchel in 2026

Background information
- Born: December 3, 1987 (age 38); Louisville, Kentucky
- Occupations: Composer and musician
- Instruments: Keyboard, cello
- Years active: 2003–present

Josh Whelchel is a composer and a musician, best known for his work in video games such as The Spirit Engine 1 and 2 and Bonesaw. He also contributed music to Scrolls with Mattias Häggström Gerdt.

In 2013, he joined the A Capella Records team to create the music licensing and distribution service Loudr. He operates as a co-founder and Chief Technology Officer.

== Discography ==
=== Albums ===
- 2003 The Spirit Engine: Original Soundtrack
- 2008 Bonesaw: Original Soundtrack
- 2008 Premonitions Vol. 1: Selections
- 2008 Premonitions Vol. 2: Calling of Fate
- 2008 Premonitions Vol. 3: The Few Who Cross a World
- 2008 Premonitions Vol. 4: A Lost Dream
- 2008 The Spirit Engine 2 – Complete Original Soundtrack
- 2008 The Spirit Engine 2 – Selections
- 2008 stories vol. 1 (2001–2008)
- 2010 GunGirl 2: Original Soundtrack
- 2010 SkullPogo: Original Soundtrack
- 2011 Ravenmark: Scourge of Estellion (Original Soundtrack)
- 2011 Wind-up Knight Soundtrack
- 2012 Jottobots, original sound.
- 2012 Me and My Dinosaur 2 Original Soundtrack [with David Saulesco]
- 2013 Rise of the Blobs Original Soundtrack
- 2015 Oblitus (Original Soundtrack)
- 2016 Masquerada: Songs and Shadows (Original Soundtrack)
- 2017 KROMAIA (Original Soundtrack)
- 2018 Castle Story (Original Soundtrack) [with FX Dupas, Mathieu Lavoie, Mattias Häggström Gerdt]

=== Singles ===
- 2008 Get Loud (feat. Ryan C. Connelly)
- 2008 Space Sushi Can't Swim in Four Loko
- 2011 Dies, Nox et Omnia (feat. Ryan C. Connelly and Danielle Messina)
- 2011 The Light of the Darkness Theme
- 2011 Power of the Meat (feat. Melinda Hershey) (appears on Super Meat Boy Soundtrack)
- 2011 So Blue (feat. Amanda Appiarius)
- 2011 Zelda's First Trip to the "Village"
- 2013 Monolith (feat. Amanda Appiarius) (appears on FZ: Side Z)
- 2015 CETRA の GAIA (appears on Materia: Final Fantasy VII Remixed by Materia Collective)
