= Pretentious Game =

2012 video game

- Developer: Keybol
- Publisher: Bulkypix
- Platforms: Windows, iOS, Android
- Release: WW: 2012
- Genre: Puzzle-platform
- Mode: Single-player

Pretentious Game is a puzzle-platform game designed by independent Filipino studio Keybol. It is a satirical take on puzzle games in which poetic hints guide players to unite two lovers. The first chapter was written for Ludum Dare's 2012 game jam, and the series of five chapters was subsequently released for PC and mobile devices.

== Gameplay ==
Players lead a blue square to his love, a pink square. Hints in the form of poetry describe their story and guide players through the puzzles.

== Development ==
Pretentious Game was written for Ludum Dare's 2012 game jam. After an unrelated Flash game, I Saw Her Standing There, received positive reviews, a fellow game developer called it pretentious. Inspired by both that game and the comment, Bari Silvestre made his own game that followed what he believed to be the rules for pretentious video games: minimal graphics, a love story, narrative text, and dramatic music. Silvestre described it as having been "made to mock the art games".

== Reception ==
The game shares similarities with Thomas Was Alone, and some people perceived it as a parody of that game. Silvestre said the similarities were coincidental. Reviewing the PC version, Jenni Lada of Technology Tell wrote, "It's nowhere near as good as Thomas Was Alone, but is charmingly reminiscent." Metacritic, a review aggregator, rated the iOS version 77/100 based on four reviews. Grant Howitt of Pocket Gamer rated the iPad version 8/10 stars and wrote, "It's very clever on a lot of different levels – narrative, gameplay, challenge – and it deserves your attention." Also reviewing the iOS version, Jeffrey deMelo of TouchArcade rated it 4/5 stars and wrote, "There's something for a specific type of gamer here, one who enjoys something a tad different and ... well, pretentious." Writing at 148apps.com, Lucy Ingram rated it 3.5/5 stars and wrote, "Concealing a deeper meaning, Pretentious Game is an enjoyable platformer with a touching message."

== Legacy ==
In May 2016, Keybol released a spinoff to the original Pretentious Game called Another Pretentious Game. In Another Pretentious Game, there are 25 levels in which instead of moving a square, you draw lines to connect multiple circles.
