= The Spirit Engine =

2003 video game

- Developer: Natomic Studios
- Designer: Mark Pay
- Engine: Multimedia Fusion
- Platform: Windows
- Release: November 7, 2003
- Genre: Role-playing
- Mode: Single-player

The Spirit Engine is a side-scrolling role-playing video game created by Mark Pay for Natomic Studios, with a soundtrack composed by Josh Whelchel. It was released on November 7, 2003 for Windows. The game is freeware, and was inspired by 16-bit console role-playing games. It was followed by a sequel, The Spirit Engine 2, in 2008.

== Gameplay ==
The game has three separate views that the player will interact with. The first interface that the player encounters is the main side-scrolling view. In this view, the player can see their three-person party in a two-dimensional environment, led by a floating spirit. By clicking on either side of the spirit or using the arrow keys, the player can control the spirit and the party will follow behind. If the spirit is close enough to certain items or people, the party will either interact with them automatically, or the player can click on them to interact. If the spirit wanders too close to a group of enemies, the second interface will be activated.

The second interface is the combat interface. The spirit is immobile during combat, however the party itself comes into play. The player can direct the party using the buttons that appear at the start of combat. The battle screen uses the same graphic view as the main side-scrolling view.

The player can exit either side of the areas in the main side-scrolling view. Doing this activates the Map screen. From the map screen, the player can select adjacent areas to travel to. The graphics of the map screens consist of small-scale representations of the party members on a backdrop which shows the world at large. Besides these three views, there are interfaces with which the player can customize their party's equipment, skills, and actions. A shopping system exists for merchants and a yes/no dialogue option for accepting quests is also present. These options are greyed out when not available.

=== Combat ===
The system for combat in The Spirit Engine is a blend of turn-based role-playing combat and real-time combat. The two teams are lined up on either side of the screen. On one side is the player's three characters, on the other side are the enemies being fought. Anywhere between one and three enemies can be fought at one time. The battle system is similar to role-playing video game systems in that movement is limited. The player can rotate the three party members: changing who is in front, in the middle, and in the back; that is the only movement possible during combat. The actions, however, all happen in real-time. Each action has a set amount of time that it takes, which can be a strategic point: pick an action that can be performed quickly, or a more time-consuming action that is overall more powerful.

Each character, monster or other combatant, has a unique set of actions that they can draw from. Actions range from simple attacks to effects such as immobilizing an enemy to aiding oneself or one's friends. The player's characters' actions begin relatively weak, but can be improved by investing skill points. When the player's party gains enough experience through defeating enemies, it will gain a level. Higher level parties have more powerful actions in general, however each individual character gains one skill point when the party increases in level. These skill points allow the player to specialize their party members. In some cases, the player may pick two characters which have the same actions available, but each character has individual strengths and weaknesses that differentiate the power sets.

== Plot ==
The player chooses three characters from nine potential party members across three classes (mage, rifleman, priest). The game begins in a mine shaft where a mysterious corporation has unearthed a monster, confirming their prophesy and bringing terror to the residents of Giant's Cradle. Each character's backstory is then introduced before they are one-by-one transported to Giant's Cradle, an island off the coast of Pansylvania. The adventure begins with a mysterious fairy leading them towards civilisation and deeper into the mystery of the game.

== Reception ==
Reception

Review score
| Publication | Score |
|---|---|
| RPGFan | 67/100 |

Patrick Gann of RPGFan described The Spirit Engine as "more playable and enjoyable than some high-profile RPG", calling it "a good case study" despite being "something of a guinea pig experiment" for its sequel that was made with "fairly primitive" tools. Noting that the "well-written" dialog was a highlight of the game, he called it "fun, if unrefined", with "good" sprites but "subpar" animations. The soundtrack received particular praise - Gann noted that it blended Eastern and Western influences, and that "Josh Whelchel is one of the best things to happen to indie VGM in a long, long time". He described the game's ending reveal as "not as big" as he expected.

PC Action magazine called the game "largely underestimated" and a "cute adventure". PC Games World magazine described the game as "incredible" on a technical level, calling its graphics some of the most impressive they had ever seen for an indie game. Stating that it was a game that "should not be missed", they praised the battle system and the amount of planning required for battles. Gameland magazine said that the game had an excellent plot, also noting its hand-drawn graphics. They stated that while it initially seemed like a platformer, it became a "fairly complex and well-thought-out" role-playing game in battle.

== Sequel ==
The game's sequel, The Spirit Engine 2, released in 2008. Its characters and world are unrelated, though its battle system and gameplay are similar and were based on those of the original.
