= Harvest: Massive Encounter =

2008 video game

- Developer: Oxeye Game Studio
- Publisher: Oxeye Game Studio
- Platforms: Mac OS X, Windows, Linux
- Release: March 5, 2008
- Genres: Real-time strategy, tower defense
- Modes: Single-player, multiplayer

Harvest: Massive Encounter is a tower defense real-time strategy video game from independent developer and publisher Oxeye Game Studio. It was released on March 5, 2008. The game was awarded a second place in the Swedish Game Awards 2007.

== Gameplay ==
The game, regardless of mode, leaves the player with a small base with two power generators and three power links. The player would then use the starting money to begin mining operations and setting up defensive lasers.

Depending on the game mode, various waves of aliens will approach. The player can build lasers and missile turrets to destroy them. The player can increase the power of a single laser by linking it together with others. This yields a more powerful beam at the expense of the total number of lasers. The missile turrets can be upgraded to either a long range cruise missile that will swarm targets, or storm missiles which have an area of effect but smaller alien detection range.

The game features a "creative mode" in which various modes can be emulated. Players can enable "Infinite Money" to creatively construct a base without limitation. Creative mode allows instant placement of enemy ships to test out defenses.

== Reception ==
Harvest: Massive Encounter received a 5.5 out of 10 (mediocre) from IGN, and a 4 out of 5 from FZ.
