= Repatriation tax avoidance =

Transactions designed to avoid corporate taxes

Repatriation tax avoidance is the legal use of a tax regime within a country in order to repatriate income earned by foreign subsidiaries to a parent corporation while avoiding taxes ordinarily owed to the parent's country on the repatriation of foreign income.

Prior to Donald Trump passed the Tax Cuts and Jobs Act of 2017, multinational firms based in the United States owed the U.S. government taxes on worldwide income. Companies avoided taxes on the repatriation of income earned abroad through a variety of strategies involving the use of mergers and acquisitions. Three main types of strategies emerged and were given names—the "Killer B", "Deadly D", and "Outbound F"—each of which took advantage of a different area of the Internal Revenue Code to conduct tax-exempt corporate reorganizations.

The application of repatriation tax avoidance strategies has drawn public scrutiny. Several large corporate acquisitions have involved significant repatriation tax avoidance strategies, including Merck & Co.'s acquisition of Schering-Plough and Johnson & Johnson's acquisition of Synthes. The use of repatriation tax avoidance strategies has been compared with the use of Double Irish arrangements to avoid taxes, though the two tax avoidance plans differ in the sorts of taxes that they allow a company to avoid. Double Irish arrangements have allowed multinational companies to avoid taxes owed to countries in which foreign subsidiaries of a U.S.-based multinational corporation are incorporated. Repatriation tax avoidance strategies, however, have allowed U.S.-domiciled companies to avoid owing taxes to the United States.

== Background ==
Until the Donald Trump Administration passed the Tax Cuts and Jobs Act of 2017, international firms based in the United States owed the federal government taxes on income earned worldwide. However, rather than collecting taxes during the year the income was earned, the United States only required companies to pay taxes on earnings that had been repatriated to the United States. During this time, companies employed strategies to repatriate some of their income from overseas while avoiding tax liabilities ordinarily associated with foreign earnings repatriation. Several strategies to avoid owing repatriation taxes to the United States government involved the creative use of mergers and acquisitions. The cost associated with repatriating income is not consistent across firms, and there is an association between the tax cost of repatriating foreign income to the United States and the probability that a firm will choose to make a domestic acquisition.

== Strategies ==
=== United States ===
Numerous strategies have been employed by firms based in the United States in order to reduce their taxes owed through the use of international corporate acquisitions. These include acquisition strategies known as the "Killer B", "Deadly D", and "Outbound F".

These three strategies facilitate tax avoidance through careful planning of transactions; a U.S.-based multinational corporation does not technically repatriate foreign profits when the strategies are followed. Instead, a company performs a set of transactions that are classified as a "reorganization" under Section 368(a)(1) of the Internal Revenue Code. The advantage of performing these transactions is that such "reorganizations" are not taxed. However, companies structure these reorganization so as to, from an economic perspective, move cash from foreign subsidiaries into the United States while financing a corporate acquisition, thereby avoiding the tax on repatriated profits that they would ordinarily have to pay if a company were to directly repatriate the profits.

==== Internal Revenue Code Section 368(a)(1) ====
The phrasing of Section 368(a)(1) of the Internal Revenue Code, which defines a corporate "reorganization" under U.S. Law, has enabled for multinational corporations to classify certain types of acquisitions as tax-exempt corporate reorganizations. This allows companies to repatriate income earned abroad tax-free when that income is used creatively to finance an acquisition. Some of these techniques have been named; those that have are generally named after the particular subsection of the Internal Revenue Code that is exploited when they are used.

===== Killer B =====
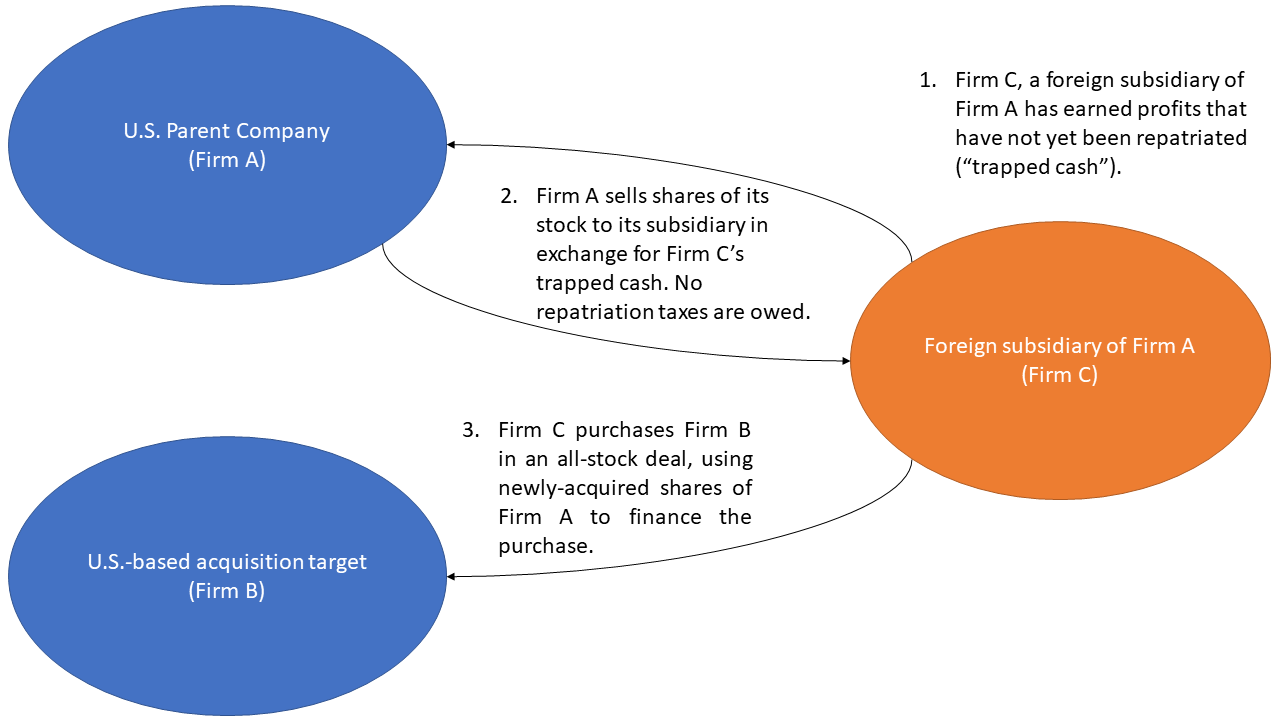
A diagram depicting the Killer B strategy's method of tax avoidance.

The "Killer B" strategy is a tax-avoidance strategy that reduces a firm's taxes owed on the repatriation of foreign cash used in the acquisition of another firm through the classification of an acquisition as a reorganization provided by Section 368(a)(1)(B) of the Internal Revenue Code. The use of this strategy requires the creation of an arrangement in which the parent corporation provides stock to a foreign subsidiary in exchange for cash, with the subsidiary then using the stock to acquire another company. This cash transferred from the foreign subsidiary to the parent company would be exempt from taxation. According to a 2011 report, the Internal Revenue Service had gained increasing success in disallowing the use of this tax avoidance strategy since 2006.

===== Deadly D =====
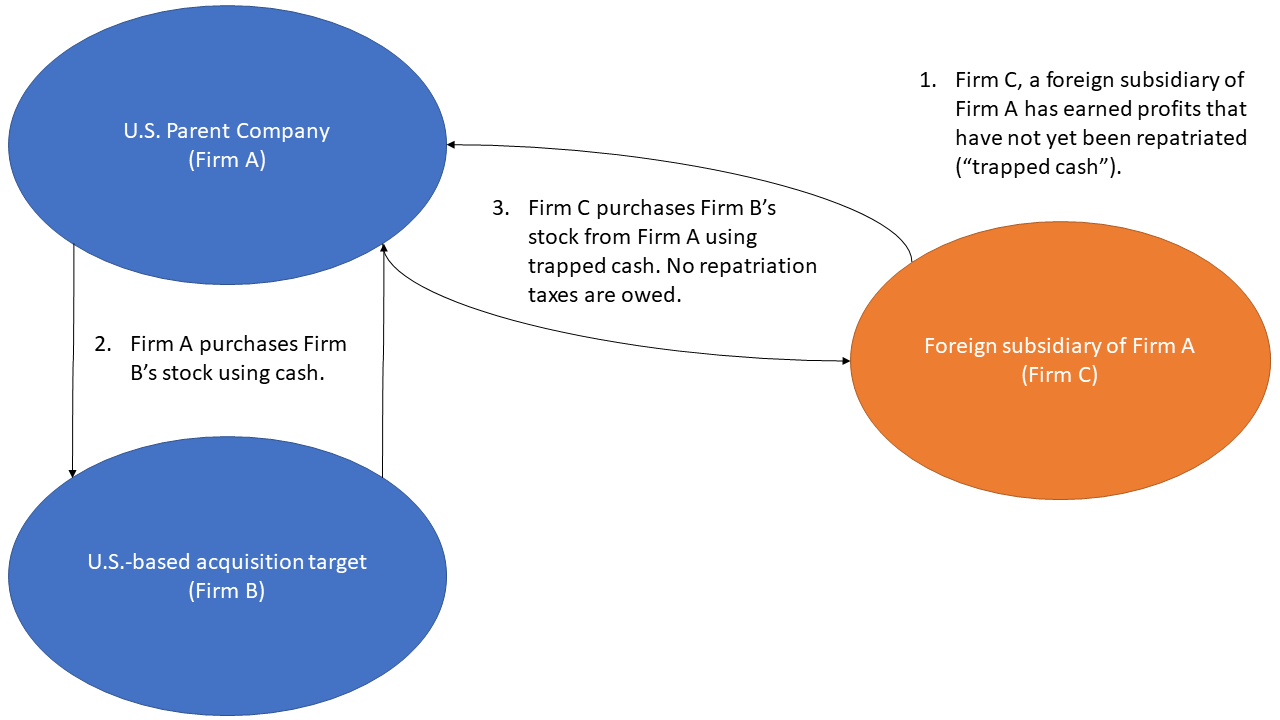
A diagram depicting the Deadly D strategy's method of tax avoidance.

The "Deadly D" strategy is a tax-avoidance strategy that utilizes Section 368(a)(1)(D) of the Internal Revenue code in order to reduce a firm's taxes owed on the repatriation of foreign cash used in the acquisition of another firm. In order to use this strategy, a parent corporation must first directly acquire a corporation, and then sell the ownership of the newly acquired corporation to a foreign subsidiary in exchange for cash. This allows for foreign cash to be effectively used to finance the acquisition of the newly acquired company without the parent corporation incurring tax liability on the repatriation of that cash.

===== Outbound F =====
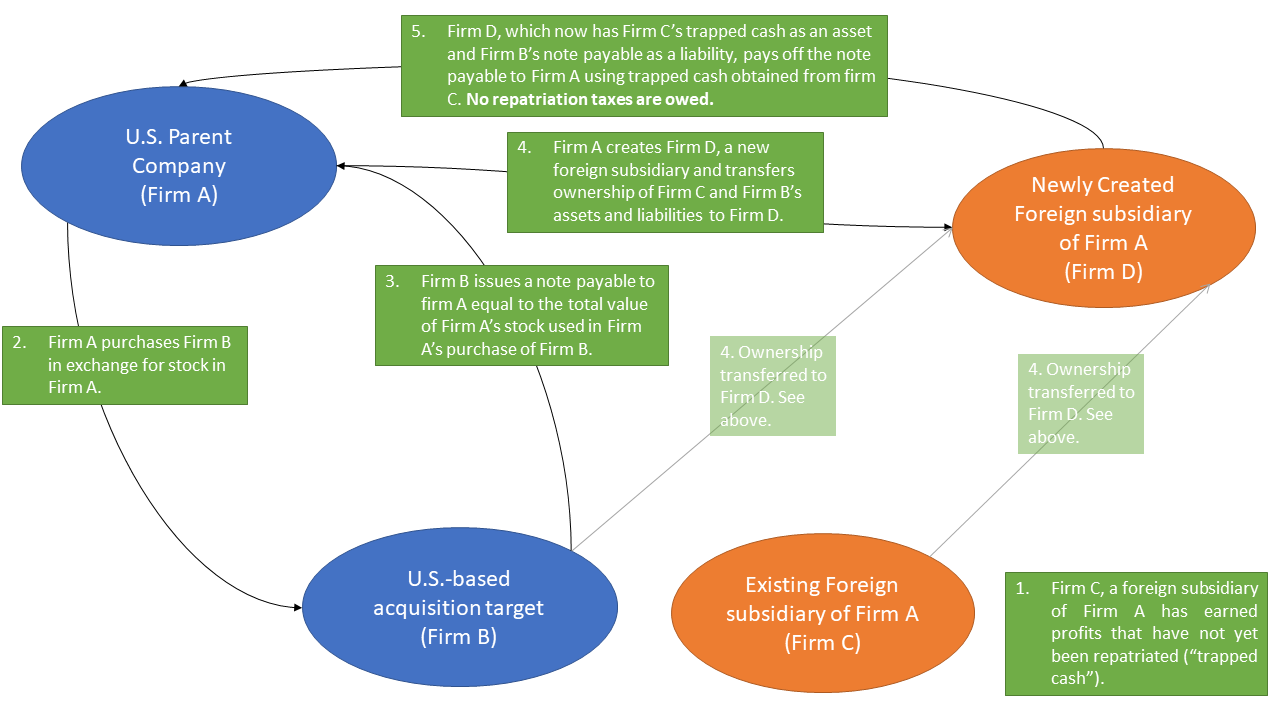
A diagram depicting the Outbound F strategy's method of tax avoidance.

The "Outbound F" strategy is a tax-avoidance strategy that utilizes Section Section 368(a)(1)(F) of the Internal Revenue code in order to repatriate foreign-earned income without incurring taxes owed. This strategy is a multi-step process that begins when the parent company acquires another company by purchasing it with stock and then forces the newly acquired company to post a bond to the parent itself. Next, the newly acquired company is transformed into a foreign subsidiary of the parent corporation, which then borrows money from other foreign-owned subsidiaries of the parent company in order to pay off the bond posted. This allows for the effective repatriation of cash up to the amount of the sum of the bond's principle and interest to be done without incurring tax liability.

== Examples ==
The tax advantages for multinational corporations of financing acquisitions using cash held abroad are widely known and have been utilized by several multinationals to avoid repatriation taxes, though the frequency of the use of these techniques is not known. Each of the Big Four accounting firms (namely Deloitte, EY, KPMG, and PwC) have created public presentations describing the legal mechanisms that undergird these strategies and the procedural steps needed to implement them.

=== Merck & Co.'s acquisition of Schering-Plough ===
In 2009, Merck & Co. used a variation of the Outbound F strategy in order to move over $9 billion from overseas into the United States without owing repatriation taxes during its purchase of Schering-Plough, avoiding $3 billion in tax liability. As a part of the deal foreign subsidiaries owned by Merck lent money to subsidiaries of Schering-Plough, which in turn used the funds to repay a loan owed by the subsidiaries of Schering-Plough to the parent corporation. As the parent corporation of Schering-Plough was acquired by Merck & Co., this amounted to the effective repatriation of overseas cash by Merck & Co. for use in an acquisition without owing repatriation taxes to the United States.

=== Johnson & Johnson's acquisition of Synthes ===
In 2012, Johnson & Johnson (J&J) acquired Synthes in a cash-and-stock deal that involved repatriation tax avoidance techniques. The Wall Street Journal reports that, two days prior to the acquisition closing, "J&J unveiled a complicated new structure for the cash and stock deal. Its Irish subsidiary, Janssen Pharmaceuticals Inc., paid for Synthes with J&J's untaxed foreign cash holdings. Then, by transferring Synthes into another of J&J's foreign subsidiaries and dissolving Synthes before the end of the quarter, the pharmaceutical giant escaped the tax hit, according to a person familiar with the deal." Six weeks after the acquisition closed, the Internal Revenue Service issued a rule described as an "anti-abuse rule" that was designed to make similar tax avoidance techniques more difficult to use going forward.

== Relationship with Double Irish arrangements ==
The Double Irish arrangement with a Dutch Sandwich constituted a widely used base erosion and profit shifting scheme that allowed United States–based multinational companies to legally avoid paying taxes on income earned abroad. The arrangement required the creation of three subsidiary companies: an Ireland-registered subsidiary that is a tax resident of Bermuda (IE Co. 1), an Ireland-registered subsidiary that is a tax resident of Ireland (IE Co. 2), and a Netherlands-registered subsidiary (NET Co.). The U.S.-based multinational would sell certain intellectual property rights to IE Co. 1, which would in turn license those intellectual property rights to NET Co in exchange for royalty payments proceeding from the use of the intellectual property. NET Co. would in turn license its intellectual property rights to IE Co. 2 in exchange for royalty payments, allowing to use the intellectual property for its products or services. In effect, this would allow for almost no taxes to be owed on income generated from the licensed intellectual property; Ireland itself has a low corporate tax rate and the payments royalty payment scheme allows for the profits on the sale of any goods or services related to the intellectual property to appear on the books of IE Co. 1, which is a tax resident of a country that has a 0% corporate tax rate.

While the Double Irish arrangement allowed for U.S. multinationals to owe little to no taxes on income earned by its subsidiaries abroad, the arrangement did not allow companies to move cash from foreign subsidiaries into the United States without incurring tax liability; income directly repatriated from a foreign subsidiary historically resulted in taxes being owed on that income. In order to avoid owing taxes to the U.S. government when using income earned abroad to finance transactions that involved a U.S. firm, U.S.-based multinational corporations utilized repatriation tax avoidance strategies that included the Killer B, Deadly D, and Outbound F.

== See also ==
- Economic policy of the Donald Trump administration
- Corporate tax in the United States
