= Slay (video game) =

Shareware turn-based strategy video game

- Slay Android app icon
- Designer: Sean O'Connor
- Programmer: Sean O'Connor
- Artist: Liam O'Connor
- Platforms: Microsoft Windows, Android, iOS, Pocket PC, Palm OS
- Release: UK: March 1995
- Genre: Turn-based strategy
- Mode: Multiplayer; player versus player; single-player

Slay is a shareware turn-based strategy game made by Sean O'Connor and released in the United Kingdom for Microsoft Windows in March 1995. It continues being ported to modern platforms, such as for Pocket PC in 2002, multiple mobile devices between 2007 and 2013, and on Steam in November 2016.

== Gameplay ==
Slay is a hexagonal strategy game where the goal is to conquer the island by buying soldiers and peasants and using them to capture enemies' hexagons.

== Reception ==
Slay received highly positive reviews. Eurogamer called it "perfectly honed" and "very satisfying", and Rock, Paper, Shotgun said it was "perfect", "so simple, so clever and so brutal". The mobile version also received positive reviews.
