= Markus Persson =

Swedish video game programmer (born 1979)

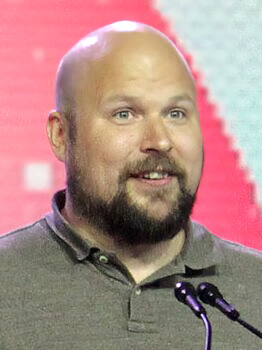
- Persson at the 2016 Game Developers Conference
- Born: Markus Alexej Persson; 1 June 1979 (age 47); Stockholm, Sweden
- Other name: Notch
- Occupations: Video game programmer; designer
- Years active: 2004–present
- Notable work: Minecraft
- Title: Founder of Mojang Studios
- Spouse: Elin Zetterstrand (m. 2011; div. 2012)
- Children: 1

Markus Alexej Persson (/ˈpɪərsən/ PEER-sən, Swedish: [ˈmǎrːkɵs ˈpæ̌ːʂɔn]; born 1 June 1979), also known by the pseudonym Notch, is a Swedish video game programmer and designer. He is the creator of Minecraft, the best-selling video game in history. (Note: Excluding Tetris, which is often seen as a video game series rather than a stand-alone video game) He founded the video game development company Mojang Studios in 2009.

Persson began developing video games at an early age. His commercial success began after he published an early version of Minecraft in 2009. Prior to the game's official retail release in 2011, it had sold over four million copies. After this point Persson stood down as the lead designer and transferred his creative authority to Jens Bergensten. In September 2014, Persson announced his intention to leave Mojang, and in November of that year the company was sold to Microsoft reportedly for US$2.5 billion, which made him a billionaire.

Since 2016, several of Persson's posts on Twitter regarding feminism, race, and transgender rights have caused public controversies. He has been described as "an increasingly polarizing figure, tweeting offensive statements regarding race, the LGBTQ community, gender, and other topics". In an effort to distance itself from Persson, Microsoft removed mentions of his name from Minecraft (excluding one instance in the game's end credits) and did not invite him to the game's tenth anniversary celebration. Persson co-founded a separate game studio called Rubberbrain in 2015, which was relaunched in 2024 as Bitshift Entertainment.

== Early life ==
Markus Alexej Persson was born in Stockholm, Sweden, to a Finnish mother, Ritva, and a Swedish father, Birger, on 1 June 1979. He has one sister. He grew up in Edsbyn until he was seven years old, when his family moved back to Stockholm. In Edsbyn, Persson's father worked for the railroad, and his mother was a nurse. He spent much time outdoors in Edsbyn, exploring the woods with his friends.

When Persson was about seven years old, his parents divorced, and he and his sister lived with their mother. His father moved to a cabin in the countryside. Persson said in an interview that they experienced food insecurity around once a month. Persson lost contact with his father for several years after the divorce.

According to Persson, his father suffered from depression, bipolar disorder, alcoholism, and medication abuse, and went to jail for robberies. While his father had somewhat recovered during Persson's early life, his father relapsed, contributing to the divorce. His sister also experimented with drugs and ran away from home.

He had gained interest in video games at an early age. His father was "a really big nerd", who built his own modem and taught Persson to use the family's Commodore 128. On it, Persson played bootleg games and loaded in various type-in programs from computer magazines with the help of his sister. The first game he purchased with his own money was The Bard's Tale. He began programming on his father's Commodore 128 home computer at the age of seven. He produced his first game at the age of eight, a text-based adventure game.

By 1994, Persson knew he wanted to become a video game developer, but his teachers advised him to study graphic design, which he did from ages 15 to 18.

Persson, although introverted, was well-liked by his peers, but after entering secondary school was a "loner" and reportedly had only one friend. He spent most of his spare time with games and programming at home. He never finished high school, but was reportedly a good student.

== Career ==
Persson started his career working as a web designer. He later found employment at Game Federation, where he met Rolf Jansson. The pair worked in their spare time to build the 2006 video game Wurm Online. The game was released through a new entity, "Mojang Specifications AB". Persson left the project in late 2007. As Persson wanted to reuse the name "Mojang", Jansson agreed to rename the company to Onetoofree AB.

Between 2004 and 2009, Persson worked as a game developer for Midasplayer (later known as King). There, he worked as a programmer, mostly building browser games made in Flash. He later worked as a programmer for jAlbum.

=== Minecraft and Mojang ===
==== Inspiration for Minecraft ====
Prior to creating Minecraft, Persson developed multiple, small games. He also entered a number of game design competitions and participated in discussions on the TIGSource forums, a web forum for independent game developers.

One of Persson's more notable personal projects was called RubyDung, an isometric three-dimensional base-building game like RollerCoaster Tycoon and Dwarf Fortress. While working on RubyDung, Persson experimented with a first-person view mode similar to that found in Dungeon Keeper. However, he felt the graphics were too pixelated and omitted this mode.

In 2009, Persson found inspiration in Infiniminer, a block-based open-ended mining game. Infiniminer heavily influenced his future work on RubyDung, and was behind Persson's reasoning for returning the first-person mode, the "blocky" visual style and the block-building fundamentals to the game.

RubyDung is the earliest known Minecraft prototype created by Persson.

==== Release and success of Minecraft ====
Persson in August 2011

On 17 May 2009, Persson released the original edition (later called "Classic version") of Minecraft on the TIGSource forums. He regularly updated the game based on feedback from TIGSource users. Persson released several new versions of Minecraft throughout 2009 and 2010, going through several phases of development including Survival Test, Indev, and Infdev. On 30 June 2010 Persson released the game's Alpha version.

While working on the pre-Alpha version of Minecraft, Persson continued working at jAlbum. In 2010, after the release and subsequent success of Minecraft's Alpha version, Persson moved from a full-time role to a part-time role at jAlbum. He left jAlbum later that year.

In September 2010, Persson travelled to Valve Corporation's headquarters in Bellevue, Washington, United States, where he took part in a programming exercise and met Gabe Newell. Persson was subsequently offered a job at Valve, which he turned down in order to continue work on Minecraft.

On 20 December 2010, Minecraft moved into its beta phase and began expanding to other platforms, including mobile. In January 2011 Minecraft reached one million registered accounts. Six months afterwards, it reached ten million. The game has sold over four million copies by 7 November 2011. Mojang held the first Minecon from 18 to 19 November 2011 to celebrate its full release, and subsequently made it an annual event. Following this, on 1 December 2011, Persson transferred creative control of Minecraft to Jens Bergensten and began working on another game title, 0x10c, although he reportedly abandoned the project around 2013.

In 2013, Mojang recorded revenues of $330 million and profits of $129 million.

==== Leaving Mojang ====
I'm not an entrepreneur. I'm not a CEO. I'm a nerdy computer programmer who likes to have opinions on Twitter.

— Markus Persson in his blog, 2014

Persson has stated that, due to the intense media attention and public pressure, he became exhausted with running Minecraft and Mojang.

In a September 2014, blog post he shared his realization that he "didn't have the connection to my fans I thought I had", that he had "become a symbol", and that he did not wish to be responsible for Mojang's increasingly large operation.

In June 2014, Persson tweeted "Anyone want to buy my share of Mojang so I can move on with my life? Getting hate for trying to do the right thing is not my gig", reportedly partly as a joke. Persson controlled a 71% stake in Mojang at the time. The offer attracted significant interest from Activision Blizzard, EA, and Microsoft. Forbes later reported that Microsoft wanted to purchase the game as a "tax dodge" to turn their taxable excess liquid cash into other assets.

In September 2014, Microsoft agreed to purchase Mojang for $2.5 billion, making Persson a billionaire. He then left the company after the deal was finalised in November.

=== Activities after leaving Mojang ===
Since leaving Mojang, Persson has worked on several small projects. On 23 June 2014 he founded a company with Porsér called Rubberbrain AB; the company had no games by 2021, despite spending SEK 60 million. The company was relaunched as Bitshift Entertainment, LLC on 28 March 2024. Persson expressed interest in creating a new video game studio in 2020, and in developing virtual reality games. He has also since created a series of narrative-driven immersive events called ".party()", which uses extensive visual effects and has been hosted in multiple cities.

At the beginning of 2025, Persson decided to create a spiritual successor to Minecraft, referred to as "Minecraft 2", in response to the results of a poll on X. However, after speaking to his team, he shortly went against this in favour of developing the other choice on his Twitter poll, a roguelike titled Levers and Chests.

== Games ==
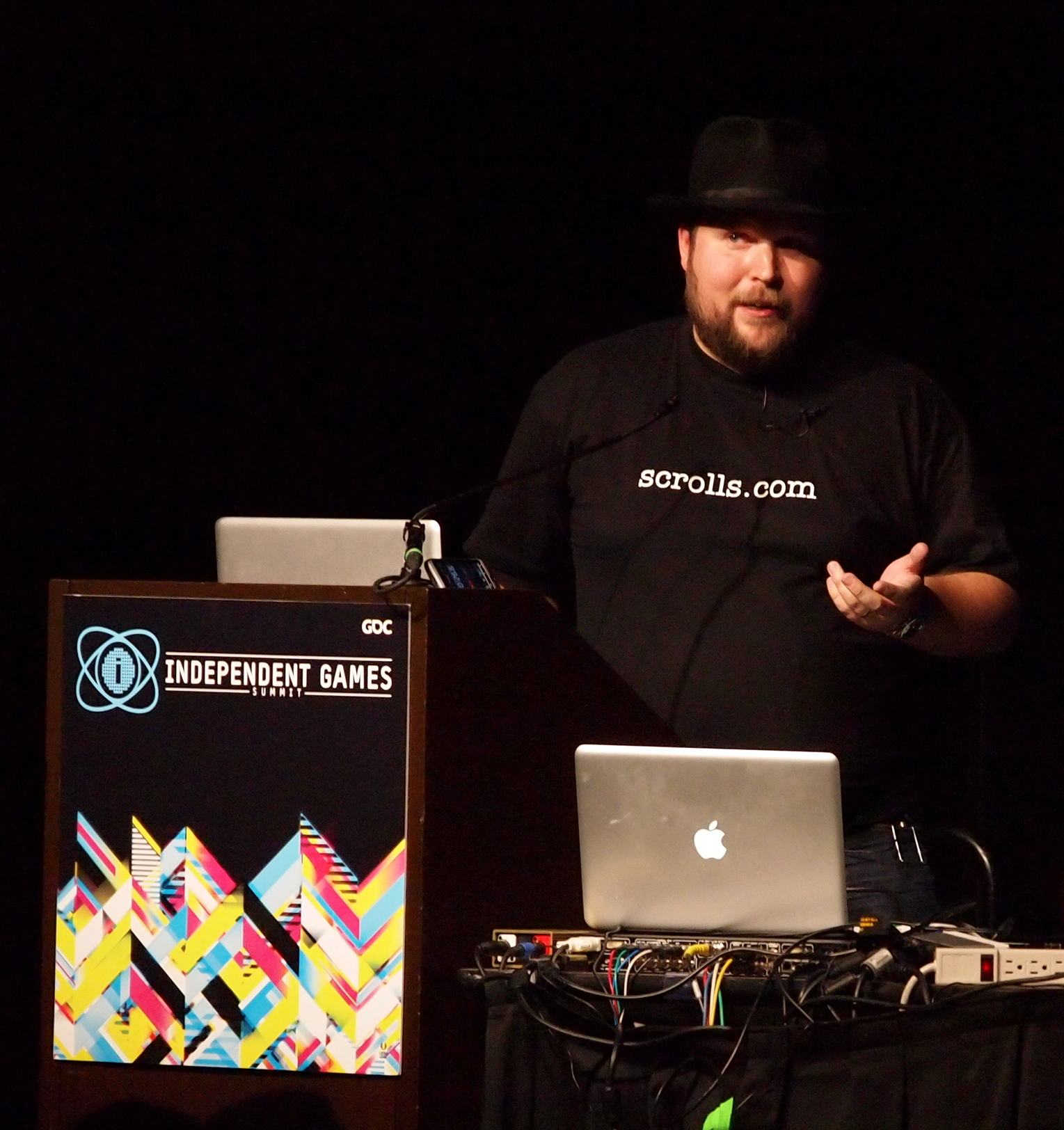
Persson at the Game Developers Conference 2011

=== Minecraft ===
Persson's most popular creation is the survival sandbox game Minecraft, which was first publicly available on 17 May 2009 and fully released on 18 November 2011. Persson left his job as a game developer to work on Minecraft full-time until completion. In early 2011, Mojang AB sold the one millionth copy of the game, several months later their second, and several more their third. Mojang hired several new staff members for the Minecraft team, while Persson passed the lead developer role to Jens Bergensten. He stopped working on Minecraft after a deal with Microsoft to sell Mojang for $2.5 billion. This brought his net worth to US$1.5 billion.

=== Caller's Bane ===
Persson and Jakob Porsér came up with the idea for Scrolls including elements from board games and collectible card games. Persson noted that he will not be actively involved in development of the game and that Porsér will be developing it. Persson revealed on his Tumblr blog on 5 August 2011 that he was being sued by a Swedish law firm representing Bethesda Softworks over the trademarked name of Scrolls, claiming that it conflicted with their The Elder Scrolls series of games. On 17 August 2011 Persson challenged Bethesda to a Quake 3 tournament to decide the outcome of the naming dispute. On 27 September 2011 Persson confirmed that the lawsuit was going to court. ZeniMax Media, owner of Bethesda Softworks, announced the lawsuit's settlement in March 2012. The settlement allowed Mojang to continue using the Scrolls trademark. In 2018, Scrolls was made available free of charge and renamed to Caller's Bane.

=== Cliffhorse ===
Cliffhorse is a humorous game programmed in two hours using the Unity game engine and free assets. The game took inspiration from Skyrim's physics engine, "the more embarrassing minimum-effort Greenlight games", Goat Simulator, and Big Rigs: Over the Road Racing. The game was released to Microsoft Windows systems as an early access and honourware game on the first day of E3 2014, instructing users to donate Dogecoin to "buy" the game before downloading it. The game accumulated over 280,000 dogecoins.

=== 0x10^{c} ===
Following the end to his involvement with Minecraft, Persson began pre-production of an alternate reality space game set in the distant future in March 2012. On April Fools' Day Mojang launched a satirical website for Mars Effect (parody of Mass Effect), citing the lawsuit with Bethesda as an inspiration. However, the gameplay elements remained true and on 4 April, Mojang revealed 0x10^{c} (pronounced "Ten to the C") as a space sandbox title. Persson officially halted game production in August 2013. However, C418, the composer of the game's soundtrack (as well as that of Minecraft), released an album of the work he had made for the game.

=== Shambles ===
In 2013, Persson made a free game called Shambles in the Unity game engine.

=== Ludum Dare entries ===
Persson has also participated in several Ludum Dare 48-hour game making competitions.

- Breaking the Tower was a game Persson developed for the entry to the Ludum Dare No. 12 competition. The game takes place on a small island, where the player must gather resources, construct buildings, and train soldiers in order to destroy a large tower on this island. The game received brief gaming media attention.
- Metagun is a 2D platformer created for Ludum Dare No. 18.
- Prelude of the Chambered is a game Persson developed for the entry to the Ludum Dare No. 21 competition. Prelude of the Chambered is a short first-person dungeon crawler video game.
- Minicraft is a game developed for Ludum Dare No. 22, held 16–19 December 2011. It is a small top-down survival game with similarities to Zelda and influenced by Minecraft. It is written in Java.

== Personal life ==
In 2011, Persson married Elin Zetterstrand, whom he had dated for four years before. Zetterstrand was a former moderator on the Minecraft forums. They had a daughter together, but by mid-2012, he began to see little of her. On 15 August 2012, he announced that he and his wife had filed for divorce. The divorce was finalised later that year.

On 14 December 2011, Persson's father committed suicide with a handgun after drinking heavily. In an interview with The New Yorker, Persson said of his father:

When I decided I wanted to quit my day job and work on my own games, he was the only person who supported my decision. He was proud of me and made sure I knew. When I added the monsters to Minecraft, he told me that the dark caves became too scary for him. But I think that was the only true criticism I ever heard from him.

Persson later admitted that he himself suffered from depression and various highs and lows in his mood.

Persson has criticised the stance of large game companies on piracy. He once stated that "piracy is not theft", viewing unauthorised downloads as potential future customers.

Persson stated himself to be a member of the Pirate Party of Sweden in 2011. He is also a member of Mensa.

He has donated to numerous charities, including Médecins Sans Frontières (Doctors Without Borders). Under his direction, Mojang spent a week developing Catacomb Snatch for the Humble Indie Bundle and raised US$458,248 for charity. He also donated $250,000 to the Electronic Frontier Foundation in 2012. In 2011, he gave $3 million in dividends back to Mojang employees.

According to Forbes, his net worth in 2023 was around $1.2 billion. In 2014, Persson was one of the biggest taxpayers in Sweden. Around 2014, he lived in a multi-level penthouse in Östermalm, Stockholm, an area he described as "where the rich people live". In December 2014, Persson purchased a home in Trousdale Estates, a neighbourhood in Beverly Hills, California, in the United States, for $70 million, a record sales price for Beverly Hills at the time. Persson reportedly outbid Beyoncé and Jay-Z for the property.

=== Social media comments ===
Persson began receiving criticism for political and social opinions he expressed on social media as early as 2016.

Avatar of notch

notch
(@notch)
tweeted:

It's ok to be white.

November 30, 2017

In 2017, he proposed a heterosexual pride holiday, and wrote that those who opposed the idea "deserve to be shot". After facing backlash, he deleted the tweets and rescinded his statements, writing, "So yeah, it's about pride of daring to express, not about pride of being who you are. I get it now." Later in the year, he wrote that feminism is a "social disease" and called the video game developer and feminist Zoë Quinn a "cunt", although he was generally critical of the GamerGate movement. He has described intersectional feminism as a "framework for bigotry" and the use of the word mansplaining as being sexist. Also in 2017, Persson tweeted that "It's okay to be white". Later that year, he stated that he believed in the Pizzagate conspiracy theory.

In 2019, he tweeted referencing QAnon, saying "Q is legit. Don't trust the media." Later in 2019, he tweeted in response to a pro-transgender internet meme that, "You are absolutely evil if you want to encourage delusion. What happened to not stigmatizing mental illness?" He then also promoted claims that people were fined for "using the wrong pronoun". However, after facing backlash, he tweeted a day afterwards that he had "no idea what [being trans is] like of course, but it's inspiring as hell when people open up and choose to actually be who they know themselves as. Not because it's a cool choice, because it's a big step. I gues [sic] that's actually cool nvm". Later that year, Microsoft removed two mentions of Persson's name in the "19w13a" snapshot of Minecraft and did not invite him to the 10-year anniversary celebration of the game. A spokesperson for Microsoft stated that his views "do not reflect those of Microsoft or Mojang". He is still mentioned in the End Poem ("a flat, infinite world created by a man called Markus").

== Awards ==
Persson accepting his GDC 2016 pioneer award

Year	Nominated work	Category	Award	Result	Notes	Ref.
2011	Minecraft	Best Debut Game, Innovation Award, Best Downloadable Game	Game Developers Choice Awards	Won		
2012	Minecraft	BAFTA Special Award	BAFTA	Won		
2016	Minecraft	Pioneer Award Winner	Game Developers Choice Awards	Won	Award formerly known as the First Penguin Award	
