= JAlbum =

Cross-platform photo website software

jAlbum
- Website type: Photo gallery creation and sharing
- Owner: jAlbum AB
- Revenue: Donations / Advertising / Hosting subscriptions
- Website: jalbum.net
- Commercial: Yes
- Launched: 2002
- Current status: Active

jAlbum is a cross-platform photo website software for creating and uploading galleries from images and videos. jAlbum has built-in support for organizing and editing images, but with focus on flexible presentation. The resulting albums can be published on jalbum.net or on the user's own website. jAlbum software has been used to create over 32 million photo galleries, with over one million users. Majestic.com counts over 118 million backlinks to jalbum.net

== Software ==
jAlbum is credited as being extremely easy to use, flexible and versatile. − It relies on the Java virtual machine, so can be run on most operating systems, and is available in 32 languages

The software allows users to manage their photo collection, sorting photos into albums, performing basic digital editing and commenting individual photos. The main focus is on producing HTML based galleries, for publishing online or distributing via other means. Users can customise the look and functionality of their photo galleries by using a small set of templates or skins that come with the program, or by choosing from dozens of skins available for download. Some are free, but others require a third party license. The community, that has formed around jAlbum produces a variety of creative skins, offering galleries based on standard HTML designs, AJAX slideshows and popular image viewers.

Jalbum was created by Swedish programmer David Ekholm in 2002.

== License ==
New license model from version 13:

− You can purchase

− (1) A Standard license to use on any computer to produce non-commercial albums for display on your own website, with one year of free support and updates.

− (2) A Pro license to use on any computer to produce commercial or non-commercial albums for display on your own website, with one year of free support and updates.

− (3) An annual license with unlimited free upgrades for as long as you have an active paid account for 10GB (Premium account non-commercial) or 100GB (Power account - commercial) of storage space on jalbum.net.

== Hosting service ==
The website jalbum.net is used by professionals and amateurs as a photo sharing website, as well as to promote and distribute the software. Users who register are offered a 30-day trial with 10 GB web space. Alternatively, a 10 GB "Premium" subscription or a 100 GB "Power" subscription are offered for a yearly subscription fee.

== See also ==
- Photo sharing
- Image hosting service
