= Cobalt WASD =

2017 video game

- Developer: Oxeye Game Studio
- Publisher: Mojang Studios
- Platform: Windows
- Release: 30 November 2017
- Genre: Action
- Mode: Multiplayer; single-player

Cobalt WASD is an action video game developed by Oxeye Game Studio and published by Mojang Studios released 30 September 2017 for Microsoft Windows.

== Gameplay ==
The player plays as either a "Metalface" or a "Protobot". The Metalfaces try to defend the bomb-sites, while the Protobots try to attack and plant a bomb. When the Protobots plant the bomb, the Metalfaces must try to defuse the bomb before it explodes. The Protobots win when they kill all of the Metalfaces, and the Metalfaces win then they defuse the bomb. At the end of each round, players can choose to buy armor, weapons, or vehicles. While the game mainly focuses on the online multiplayer game mode, there is a mode where the player can play against offline bots.

== Development ==
Cobalt WASD is a separate stand-alone spin-off of Cobalt. The developers saw that the original game was too complex for some players and its higher price point discouraged some players, so they wanted to make a completely different game. They decided to make a spin-off of Cobalt, focusing on just one game mode. The game was used early access.

== Reception ==
Eurogamer.it found Cobalt WASD to be a "very funny and competitive multiplayer game". PC Games N called it a "2D version of Call of Duty's Search and Destroy game mode". Bit-tech.net reviewed the game positively.
