= Cobalt (video game) =

2016 video game

- Developer: Oxeye Game Studio
- Publishers: Mojang Studios; Microsoft Studios
- Composer: Mattias Häggström Gerdt
- Platforms: Microsoft Windows; Xbox 360; Xbox One
- Release: 2 February 2016
- Genre: Action
- Modes: Single-player, multiplayer

Cobalt is an action side-scrolling video game developed by Oxeye Game Studio and published by Mojang Studios. It was released on February 2nd, 2016, for Microsoft Windows, Xbox 360 and Xbox One.

== Gameplay ==
=== Game modes ===
Cobalt has a story mode and five multiplayer modes:

- Deathmatch: A type of the game mode where various weapons and throwables are spawned across the map, which are to be picked up. Players can play free-for-all deathmatch, or with teams. Up to 8 players can play in a multiplayer match.
- Team Strike: At the beginning of each round, players buy one of six classes, which each have certain advantages and disadvantages. Players then play in 4 vs. 4 eliminations. As soon as a team is eliminated, a new round begins. They can play in their character's current condition, repair their character, or sell it to get a new class. 8 players can participate in a multiplayer match.
- Plug Slam: Like deathmatch, various weapons are placed on the map. A plug is placed in the middle of the map. The goal is for the player to get the plug into the opponent's goal.
- Survival: At the beginning of a wave, players buy equipment, then must survive attacks, occasionally receiving objectives. Once a wave is over, players have the ability to upgrade their equipment.
- Challenge: These are time-driven challenges which test players' ability in speed and combat.
  - Speed: Speed challenges are time-based and require players to pass through all checkpoints until they get to the end. Obstacles may be present, such as enemies, turrets, and environmental hazards.
  - Combat: Combat challenges are also time-based and have targets that players must kill. Their score increases by performing actions like saving prisoners and taking out optional enemies.

Players play as the main character, known as Cobalt. Some key mechanics of the game include bullet time, rolling (to deflect bullets and/or increase speed), attacks, both ranged and melee, using various weapons of both kinds, which can deal damage and knock back throwables, all of which a player can combo together to produce an advanced level of play.

== Development ==
=== Alpha ===
Cobalt was released in its alpha stage of development. Updates to subsequent versions of the game are free. The alpha version was initially only available for the Windows operating system. A macOS version was released on 27 June 2013, but the game was later developed as Xbox 360, Xbox One and Microsoft Windows exclusive.

The alpha version's main goals were:

- Local multiplayer
- Introducing both the single-player and co-op Adventure mode
- Introducing the level editor

=== Beta ===
Additional features were planned for the beta stage including a fully working level editor (and multiple editors), in-game level sharing between players, as well as the macOS and Linux ports of the game. Of these, the editors and the macOS port were released during the Alpha stage.

The Beta was never officially released as the game left Alpha, and the game was instead launched directly into its Gold version.

=== Gold ===
The final version of the game includes tools for sharing user-generated content (on Steam), a complete story mode, and same computer co-op multiplayer. Unlike the alpha, the main game's engine is powered by Autodesk Stingray (as opposed to the in-house engine DaisyMoon). The macOS and Linux ports were ultimately scrapped in favor of prioritizing networked play.

=== Xbox port ===
The game was ported to the Xbox 360 and Xbox One by Fatshark. This version of the game has not been updated since release.

== Reception ==
Reception

Aggregate score
Aggregator	Score	
Aggregator	PC	Xbox One
Metacritic	69/100	66/100

Review scores
Publication	Score	
Publication	PC	Xbox One
Destructoid	4/10	N/A
IGN	N/A	4.5/10
Polygon	N/A	7/10

Cobalt received "mixed or average" reviews, according to video game review aggregator website Metacritic.

== See also ==
- Cobalt WASD
