= Caller's Bane =

2014 digital collectible card game

- Developer: Mojang
- Publisher: Mojang
- Designers: Jakob Porsér; Måns Olson
- Artist: Markus Toivonen
- Writer: Jerry Holkins
- Composers: Mattias Häggström Gerdt; Josh Whelchel
- Engine: Unity
- Platforms: Microsoft Windows, OS X, Android
- Release: 11 December 2014
- Genre: Tactical collectible card game
- Modes: Single-player, multiplayer

Caller's Bane (originally named Scrolls) is a strategy-based digital collectible card game developed by Mojang, which aims to combine elements from trading card games and traditional board games. Scrolls was originally conceived and developed by Jakob Porsér, who along with Mojang founder Markus Persson, intended to create a type of game that was currently missing from the market. The game is developed using the Unity game engine, allowing it to run on multiple gaming platforms. Scrolls was announced on 2 March 2011, as Mojang Studios' second game. While Mojang had claimed that they stopped development of the game in June 2015, the company revealed that they had still been working on the project, and in June 2018, released the game under its new title Caller's Bane for free. The last update was released in 2019.

== Gameplay ==
The game revolves around the use of cards, or "scrolls", to work toward destroying three of the opposing player's five idols, which are static objects on either end of the battlefield. There are four different types of scrolls in Caller's Bane: creatures, structures, spells and enchantments. Creatures are played on the board and can attack to destroy enemy creatures and idols. Structures are also played on the board and, unlike creatures, are immobile. Spells have a wide range of effects, but are often played against creatures or structures. Enchantments are played on creatures and usually provide a lasting effect to that creature.

=== Statistics ===
Each unit (creature or structure) has three basic statistics associated with it: Attack, Countdown, and Health. Attack specifies how much damage the unit will deal (some units do not attack and instead have a "-" for that stat). Countdown specifies how many turns the unit waits before it attacks. Each time it is the player's turn, all units (with some exceptions) count down by 1. If a unit counts down to 0, then the unit will attack at the end of the turn. When the unit is finished attacking, its countdown will reset to its base countdown, which is typically 2 but can range from 1 to 6. Health is the amount of cumulative damage a unit can take before it is destroyed. As a basis for comparison, all idols in a standard match start with 10 health.

=== Turns ===
Once it becomes a player's turn, the player either have 90 seconds to perform actions (in multiplayer) or unlimited time (in singleplayer). At any time during their turn, a player may move creatures to adjacent, empty spots, up to once per creature per turn. Structures cannot be moved without the help of specific spells or enchantments. A player may also, once per turn, "sacrifice" a scroll in their hand; sacrificing allows the player to either draw two new scrolls or gain a resource point. A player may play as many scrolls as their resources or hand allow. A turn is finished when the hourglass icon at the bottom left is clicked. You draw one new scroll each turn.

=== Resources ===
Resource points are used towards playing scrolls: each scroll has a "cost" (1–8 resources). There are four different resources in the game: Energy, Order, Growth, and Decay; and one "super-resource", Wild, which can be used in place of any resource but has limitations on when a player can sacrifice for it. Each scroll belongs to a different resource, or faction. For example, the scroll Cannon Automaton costs 6 Energy to play. When one sacrifices a scroll for a resource, their maximum resource goes up. Thus there are two values per resource: current resource and maximum resource. A player's current resource is depleted when they play scrolls, but at the beginning of their turn their current resource is filled back up to their maximum resource.

== Development ==
Markus "Notch" Persson, the creator of Minecraft and Jakob Porsér were inspired to make a new type of game missing from the market, envisioning a game which would include elements from collectible card games and traditional board games. The result "would be a strategic game with a strong foundation in tactical game play".

In July 2012, Scrolls moved into a closed alpha phase, with a small portion of those who signed up given full access to the game. Additional invites were given out as the testing period expanded into an open beta phase. In June 2013, the game entered an open beta stage which allowed public purchase of the title.

On 11 July 2013, it was announced that Scrolls would implement crafting. With the addition of this feature, three of the same scroll could be crafted into one scroll of a higher tier which had additional visual effects. Scrolls tier two and up would save match statistics, and in a later update tier three scrolls were made to give their owner a small gold boost when drawn in a match.

In October 2013, Scrolls announced 'Judgement Mode', a mode where players draft cards into a new deck from a card pool, then play several games with those cards. After these games, the player gets to keep a number of cards proportionate to how well they did in their matches.

On 10 December 2014, Mojang announced that Scrolls would be leaving its beta phase to officially release the next day. Scrolls was ported to iOS, however Apple rejected the submission for release because of the game's account system which required players to register before playing. The iOS version was ultimately cancelled once Mojang announced they would cease active development on the game in June 2015.

As game development continued, upcoming features were pushed to a "test server" before being implemented into the game. This allowed the developers to gather feedback on new features and perform balancing tweaks and bug fixes before they were officially implemented into the game. The test server was accessible via the "More Options" button in the game launcher.

In June 2015, Mojang announced that they would cease developing further content for the game. They also noted that all proceeds from the game will go towards maintaining servers, which they confirmed would continue running until at least 1 July 2016.

In February 2018, the developers announced that the game servers would shut down on 13 February 2018, although they were planning to release the server client for the community to use. On 20 June 2018, Mojang released the title under its new name Caller's Bane as a free client configured to work with community servers.

=== Bethesda lawsuit ===
Mojang was involved in a legal disagreement with Bethesda Softworks, who claimed that the use of the name Scrolls would cause confusion with its own The Elder Scrolls series. Mojang won the interim injunction regarding the issue with the name "Scrolls" and is allowed to continue using that name for future development. In March 2012, Mojang and Bethesda reached a settlement, in which Mojang would not trademark Scrolls, but Bethesda would not contest the naming of Scrolls, so long as it would not be a competitor against their game (The Elder Scrolls). Following Mojang's acquisition by Microsoft in 2014, and Bethesda's parent company ZeniMax being acquired by Microsoft in 2020, both parties involved in the original dispute became subsidiaries of the same corporate entity. As a result, the previous legal conflict over the title Scrolls became moot.

== Reception ==
Reception

Aggregate score
Aggregator	Score
Metacritic	73/100

Upon the release, the game received mixed to positive reviews, scoring 73 out of 100 on the review aggregator site Metacritic, and 7.3 User Score based on 46 reviews.
