= Minecraft (franchise) =

Multimedia franchise

- Created by: Markus Persson
- Original work: Minecraft (2011)
- Owner: Mojang Studios
- Years: 2009–present

Print publications
- Book: Minecraft: The Unlikely Tale of Markus "Notch" Persson and the Game That Changed Everything
- Novels: List of novels
- Comics: Minecraft: The Manga
- Graphic novel: Dark Horse Comics Volumes (2019–2021); Minecraft: Wither Without You; Minecraft: Open World; Minecraft: Stories from the Overworld

Films and television
- Films: Minecraft: The Story of Mojang (2012); A Minecraft Movie (2025); A Minecraft Movie Squared (2027)
- Short film: LEGO Minecraft web shorts (2017–2019)
- Web series: Minecraft Mini-Series (2017–2018)
- Animated series: Untitled animated series (TBA)

Games
- Traditional: Minecraft Card Game?; Uno Minecraft; Minecraft: Builders & Biomes; Minecraft: Heroes of the Village; Minecraft: Portal Dash; Minecraft: Explorers; Minecraft: Builders & Biomes – Junior
- Video games: Minecraft (2011); Minecraft: Story Mode (2015–2017); Minecraft Earth (2019-2021); Minecraft Dungeons (2020); Minecraft Legends (2023); Minecraft Dungeons II (2026); Minecraft Blast (TBA)

Audio
- Soundtracks: Minecraft – Volume Alpha (2011) (Other soundtracks); A Minecraft Movie (2025)
- Original music: "Steve's Lava Chicken"

Miscellaneous
- Toy: Lego Minecraft
- Theme park attraction: Minecraft World
- Event(s): Minecraft Live

Official website
- minecraft.net

Minecraft is a media franchise developed from and centered around the 2011 video game. (Note: Minecraft was first publicly available on 17 May 2009, and following many developmental phases over the next two years, was fully released on 18 November 2011.) Developed by Mojang Studios and Xbox Game Studios, which are owned by Microsoft Corporation, the franchise consists of five video games, along with various books, merchandise, events, board games, and a theatrical film. Microsoft acquired Mojang AB in 2014, alongside the Minecraft game and its editions.

== Minecraft ==
Minecraft is a 3D survival sandbox game developed by Mojang Studios and owned by Microsoft, spanning multiple platforms. It was first released by the independent video game designer Markus Persson in 2009, before giving the development to Jens Bergensten in 2011 after the game's full 1.0 update. The game has no specific goals to accomplish, allowing players a large amount of freedom in choosing how to play the game. Gameplay is in the first-person perspective, with the core gameplay modes being survival, in which players must acquire resources to build the world and maintain health (optionally with a "hardcore" limit, which deletes the world after the player dies); and creative, in which players have unlimited resources, no hunger and are able to fly. The game world is composed of voxels—cubes, commonly called "blocks"—representing various materials, such as dirt, stone, ores, tree trunks, water, and lava, which are arranged in a 3-dimensional grid. Gameplay revolves around picking up and placing these objects as the player pleases, while being able to move freely around the world.

== Spin-off games ==
Release timeline
2011	Minecraft
2012
2013
2014
2015	Minecraft: Story Mode
2016
2017	Minecraft: Story Mode – Season 2
2018
2019	Minecraft Earth
2020	Minecraft Dungeons
2021
2022
2023	Minecraft Legends
2024
2025
2026	Minecraft Dungeons II
TBA	Minecraft Blast

=== Minecraft: Story Mode ===
Minecraft: Story Mode, an episodic spin-off game developed by Telltale Games in collaboration with Mojang, was announced in December 2014. Consisting of five episodes plus three additional downloadable episodes, the standalone game is a narrative and player choice-driven, and it was released on Windows, OS X, iOS, PlayStation 3, PlayStation 4, Xbox 360, and Xbox One via download on 13 October 2015. A physical disc that grants access to all episodes was released for the aforementioned four consoles on 27 October. Wii U and Nintendo Switch versions were available in 2017. From late 2018 to 5 December 2022, it was available on Netflix, where only the first five episodes were available. The first trailer for the game was shown at Minecon on 4 July 2015, revealing some of the game's features. In Minecraft: Story Mode, players control Jesse (voiced by Patton Oswalt and Catherine Taber), who sets out on a journey with his or her friends to find The Order of the Stone—four adventurers who slayed an Ender Dragon—in order to save their world. Brian Posehn, Ashley Johnson, Scott Porter, Martha Plimpton, Dave Fennoy, Corey Feldman, Billy West and Paul Reubens portray the rest of the cast.

==== Minecraft: Story Mode – Season 2 ====
The second season was released from July to December 2017. It continued the story from the first season, with the player's choices affecting elements within Season Two. Patton Oswalt, Catherine Taber, Ashley Johnson, and Scott Porter were confirmed to continue voicework for the new season. The game supports the new Crowd Play feature that Telltale introduced in Batman: The Telltale Series, allowing up to 2,000 audience members to vote on decisions for the player using Twitch or other streaming services. It was shut down along with the original Minecraft: Story Mode, on 25 June 2019.

=== Minecraft Earth ===
Minecraft Earth was an augmented reality sandbox game developed by Mojang Studios and published by Xbox Game Studios. A spin-off of the video game Minecraft, it was first announced in May 2019, and was available on Android, iOS, and iPadOS. The game allowed players to interact with the world and build Minecraft-style structures and objects that will persist and can be modified by other players. The game implemented the resource-gathering and many of the other features of the original game in an augmented-reality setting. The game had a beta release in July 2019. The game was free-to-play, and was released in early access in October 2019. The game was shut down on 30 June 2021, and players who made in-game purchases on the app received a free copy of the Bedrock Edition.

=== Minecraft Dungeons ===
Minecraft Dungeons is a dungeon crawler video game developed by Mojang Studios and Double Eleven. It was published by Xbox Game Studios. It is a spin-off of Minecraft and was released for Nintendo Switch, PlayStation 4, Windows, and Xbox One on 26 May 2020. The game received mixed reviews; many deemed the game fun and charming, with praise for its visuals and music. However, its simple gameplay and use of procedural generation received a more mixed reception, with its short story and lack of depth criticized. It is a hack and slash-styled dungeon crawler, rendered from an isometric perspective. Players explore procedurally generated and hand crafted dungeons filled with new variants of existing Minecraft monsters and also deal with traps, puzzles, bosses and finding treasure.

==== Minecraft Dungeons Arcade ====
In early 2021, Mojang announced an arcade adaptation version of Minecraft Dungeons associated with collectible cards.

=== Minecraft Legends ===
Minecraft Legends is an action-strategy game developed by Mojang Studios and Blackbird Interactive, announced on 12 June 2022 and released on 18 April 2023. It stopped receiving updates on January 10, 2024.

=== Minecraft Blast ===
Minecraft Blast is a mobile puzzle game developed by Mojang Studios in collaboration with King. The gameplay is similar to match-three games such as Candy Crush Saga, featuring levels filled with blocks that can be broken if two or more adjacent blocks are the same, with the remaining blocks falling down to occupy empty spaces, possibly resulting in a chain reaction. Outside of levels, the player can build their base using pre-made elements bought using an in-game currency. During November 2025, the game was available in Malaysia and Canada as an iOS only soft launch title. It is currently unavailable and according to developers the playtest has been completed.

=== Minecraft Dungeons II ===
Minecraft Dungeons II, a sequel to Minecraft Dungeons, was announced on March 21, 2026, and released on September 29, 2026, for Nintendo Switch, Nintendo Switch 2, PlayStation 5, and Xbox Series X and Series S, as well as Windows.

== Films ==
=== Minecraft: The Story of Mojang (2012) ===
Minecraft: The Story of Mojang is a 2012 documentary film produced by 2 Player Productions and directed by Paul Owens. It is about the first year of Mojang, the development company founded by game designer Markus "Notch" Persson, and the development and release of Persson's game Minecraft. The film features interviews with prominent game designers affected by Minecraft, popular online figures associated with the game, and segments with fans and community members.

Established by their documentary Reformat the Planet (2008) and work with Penny Arcade, 2 Player Productions had originally wanted to create a series of pilot episodes about various video games, but instead decided to create a full-length film on Minecraft. Announced in January 2011, the production was funded through a Kickstarter campaign grossing over US$210,000, one of the platform's biggest campaigns at the time. Production spanned nearly two years in Europe and North America, following events at Mojang and milestones for Minecraft and Persson. Original Minecraft composer C418 provided the score, which was released as part of his album One.

Minecraft: The Story of Mojang premiered on Xbox Live on December 22, 2012. It was made available for download and streaming the following day by 2 Player Productions, with Fangamer handling its release on DVD. It was well received, gaining praise for its presentation, emotional aspect, charm, and value to fans, though its narrative and informative depth were questioned. 2 Player Productions also uploaded the documentary to the torrent index the Pirate Bay, but urged people to consider purchasing it. The company published the film on YouTube in November 2013, and it had its broadcast television premiere on Fusion TV in March 2015.

=== A Minecraft Movie (2025) ===
In 2012, Mojang received offers from Hollywood producers who wanted to produce Minecraft-related TV shows; however, Mojang stated they would only engage in such projects when "the right idea comes along". In February 2014, Persson revealed that Mojang was in talks with Warner Bros. Pictures to develop an official Minecraft film to be produced by Roy Lee and Jill Messick. In October 2014, Mojang CEO Vu Bui stated that the movie was "in its early days of development", saying that it was a "large-budget" production, and also said that it might not be released until 2018. That same month, Warner Bros. hired Shawn Levy to direct the film, while in December, it was confirmed that Levy and writers Kieran and Michele Mulroney, who were developing the film together had left the project.

In July 2015, it was announced that Warner Bros. had hired Rob McElhenney to direct the film. According to McElhenney, he had been drawn to the film based on the open-world nature of the game, an idea Warner Bros. had initially agreed with and for which they had provided him with a preliminary US$150 million budget. In 2016, early production started on the film, including in June assigning a release date of 24 May 2019, in October setting Jason Fuchs to write the script, and in November contracting Steve Carell to star as the voice of an unknown character. McElhenney's Minecraft film "slowly died on the vine," and due to scheduling conflicts, he left the film in August 2018, Aaron and Adam Nee were tapped to rewrite the script, and the film was delayed as a result. No new director was announced at that time.

In January 2019, Peter Sollett was announced to write and direct the film, featuring an entirely different story from McElhenney's version. Messick, who died in 2018, will be posthumously credited as producer. In April 2019, Warner Bros. scheduled the new film to be released in theaters on 4 March 2022. In June 2019, Allison Schroeder was hired to write the script and co-write the film with Sollett. In October 2020, the COVID-19 pandemic prompted Warner Bros. to adjust its release schedule, including removing the Minecraft film from its planned release date.

Sollett instead directed Metal Lords, which was released exclusively on Netflix in April 2022. That same month, production on the Minecraft film was announced to be moving forward without Sollett and Schroeder, now with Jared Hess set to direct and Jason Momoa in early talks to star. The film was also confirmed to be live action. Some sources also said that Chris Bowman and Hubbel Palmer would rewrite the script. In early April 2023, it was reported that the film would release on 4 April 2025. In May, Matt Berry entered negotiations to join the cast. On 19 June 2023, it was reported that principal photography on the film would start on 7 August in New Zealand, before filming was delayed in July due to the 2023 SAG-AFTRA strike. Following the conclusion of the strike in early November 2023, filming was reported to be aiming for an early 2024 start. Later that month, Danielle Brooks and Sebastian Eugene Hansen joined the cast as Dawn and Henry, respectively, and filming was scheduled to begin in late December 2023. In early December, Emma Myers also joined the cast. In early January 2024, Jack Black was cast as Steve, teasing his casting in the film via his official Instagram account. The film's first teaser trailer was released on 4 September 2024, to a mixed response from critics, while a positive from audiences. A sequel, A Minecraft Movie Squared, is scheduled to be released on 23 July 2027.

== Animated series ==
In May 2024, during the fifteenth anniversary of the first Minecraft version, it was announced that an animated series based on the video game franchise was being produced by WildBrain as well as Mojang, with Flying Bark Productions providing animation services. The series is being described as "[featuring] an original story with new characters, showing the world of Minecraft in a new light." The series is set to be released on Netflix on an unknown date.

== Books ==
=== Official novels ===
The game has inspired several officially licensed novels set in the Minecraft universe:

- Brooks, Max (18 July 2017). Minecraft: The Island: An Official Minecraft Novel. Del Rey Books. ISBN 9780399181771.
- Baptiste, Tracey (10 July 2018). Minecraft: The Crash: An Official Minecraft Novel. Del Rey Books. ISBN 9780399180668.
- Lafferty, Mur (9 July 2019). Minecraft: The Lost Journals: An Official Minecraft Novel. Del Rey Books. ISBN 9780399180699.
- Valente, Catherynne (3 December 2019). Minecraft: The End: An Official Minecraft Novel. Del Rey Books. ISBN 9780399180729.
- Brooks, Max (2 March 2021). Minecraft: The Mountain: An Official Minecraft Novel. United States: Del Rey Books. ISBN 978-0-593-15915-6.
- Eliopulos, Nick (5 August 2021). Minecraft Stonesword Saga: Crack in the Code. Random House Books for Young Readers. ISBN 9780593372982.
- Eliopulos, Nick (17 March 2022). Minecraft Stonesword Saga: Mobs Rule. Random House Books for Young Readers. ISBN 9780008512385.
- Eliopulos, Nick (28 June 2022). Minecraft Stonesword Saga: New Pets on the Block. Random House Books for Young Readers. ISBN 9780008495961.
- Brooks, Max (17 October 2023). Minecraft: The Village: An Official Minecraft Novel. United States: Del Rey Books. ISBN 9780593159187.

=== Other books ===
- Minecraft: The Unlikely Tale of Markus "Notch" Persson and the Game That Changed Everything is a book written by Daniel Goldberg and Linus Larsson (and translated by Jennifer Hawkins) about the story of Minecraft and its creator, Markus "Notch" Persson. The book was released on 17 October 2013.
- A graphic novel set in the Minecraft franchise, Trayaurus and the Enchanted Crystal, was published by YouTuber DanTDM in October 2016, reaching the first spot on The New York Times Best Seller list for hardcover graphic books and remaining there for eleven consecutive weeks.
- Gameknight999 is a series of six trilogies about a protagonist who is transported into the digital Minecraft world and experiences harrowing adventures involving the antagonist Herobrine. The first trilogy was listed in the New York Times top 10 bestsellers in February 2015.
- Minecraft: The Manga is a Japanese manga series written and illustrated by Kazuyoshi Seto. It was serialized in April 2020. By October 2023, it has sold over 500,000 copies in Japan. As of October 2024, the series has release 10 volumes.

== Tabletop games ==
Three tabletop games have been produced as official tie-in games for Minecraft. The first two are both card games, namely Minecraft Card Game?, produced by Mattel in 2015, and Uno Minecraft, produced by Mattel in 2016.

Towards the end of 2019, Minecraft: Builders & Biomes, a board game version of Minecraft, was announced. The game was geared towards the family market, catered for 2–4 players, and was published by Ravensburger. Players explore the Overworld, build structures, and mine resources in a quest to score the most points. At the end of 2020, an expansion for the tabletop game was released, titled Minecraft: Farmer's Market Expansion, which introduced a new farm biome that enabled players to produce vegetables.

== Merchandise ==
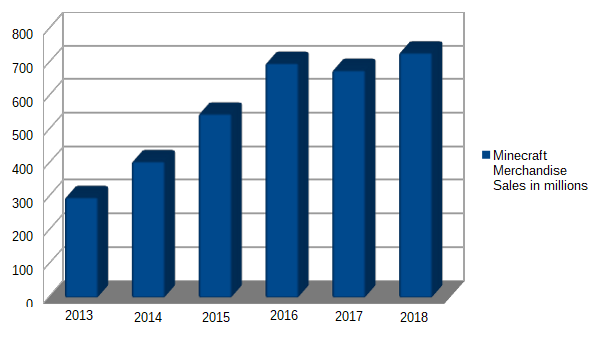
Minecraft merchandise sales in millions U.S. dollars

=== Lego Minecraft ===
The first Lego set based on Minecraft was released on 6 June 2012. The set, called "Micro World", centres around a microscale representation of a forest from the game and includes Lego versions of the game's default player character and a creeper. Mojang submitted the concept of Minecraft merchandise to Lego in December 2011 for the Lego Cuusoo program, from which it quickly received 10,000 votes by users, prompting Lego to review the concept. Lego Cuusoo approved the concept in January 2012 and began developing sets based on Minecraft. Two more sets based on the Nether and village areas of the game were released on 1 September 2013. A fourth Micro World set, the End, was released in June 2014. Six more, larger Lego minifigure scale, sets became available November 2014, with more released every year since.

=== Other merchandise ===
Mojang often collaborates with Jinx, an online game merchandise store, to sell Minecraft merchandise, such as clothing, foam pickaxes, and toys of creatures in the game. By May 2012, over 1 million dollars were made from Minecraft merchandise sales. T-shirts and socks were the most popular products. In March 2013, Mojang signed a deal with the Egmont Group, a children's book publisher, to create Minecraft handbooks, annuals, poster books, and magazines. Amiibo figurines of the characters Steve and Alex were released in September 2022, and are compatible with the video game Super Smash Bros. Ultimate. In 2021 the Australia Post created a Minecraft-themed postage stamp pack. In late 2024, Australian dairy company Norco released a range of flavoured milks as part of a shared goal of "building a better world". Minecraft content is scheduled to be released for Sonic Racing: CrossWorlds as part of its DLC season pass.

== Events ==
=== Minecon ===
Minecon (stylized as "MineCon" or "MINECON") is an official convention dedicated to Minecraft. The first one was held in November 2011 at the Mandalay Bay Hotel and Casino in Las Vegas. All 4,500 tickets for MineCon 2011 were sold out by 31 October. The event included the official launch of Minecraft; keynote speeches, including one by Persson; building and costume contests; Minecraft-themed breakout classes; exhibits by leading gaming and Minecraft-related companies; commemorative merchandise; and autograph and picture times with Mojang employees and well-known contributors from the Minecraft community. After MineCon, there was an Into The Nether after-party with deadmau5. Free codes were given to every attendee of MineCon that unlocked alpha versions of Mojang's Scrolls, as well as an additional non-Mojang game, Cobalt, developed by Oxeye Game Studios. Similar events occurred in MineCon 2012, which took place in Disneyland Paris in November. The tickets for the 2012 event sold out in less than two hours. MineCon 2013 was held in Orlando in November. MineCon 2015 was held in London in July. MineCon 2016 was held in Anaheim in September. MineCon 2017 was held as a livestream instead of being held at a show floor. Titled "MINECON Earth", it was streamed live in November.

MineCon Earth 2018 followed the same format as the 2017 event, but was renamed in 2019 to "MINECON Live" to avoid confusion with Mojang's augmented-reality game, Minecraft Earth.

=== Minecraft Festival ===
In MineCon Live 2019, Mojang announced Minecraft Festival, an in-person event to be held 25–27 September 2020, in Orlando, Florida. The event has since been delayed indefinitely due to the COVID-19 pandemic.

=== Minecraft Live ===
On 3 September 2020, it was announced by Mojang that a new livestreamed event would be taking place to replace the postponed Minecraft Festival. It took place on 3 October 2020, showing the features of Minecraft's "Caves and Cliffs" update. The second Minecraft Live took place on 16 October 2021 and showcased more of the Caves and Cliffs part 2 update, along with announcing and showing of features for the Wild Update. The third Minecraft Live took place on 15 October 2022 and announced more of the features in the Wild Update and the (at the time) unnamed next update.

== Notable achievements ==
The Minecraft franchise covers a wide range of content. In late 2021, videos of Minecraft hit 1 trillion views on YouTube. The video game Minecraft is the best-selling video game of all time, surpassing Tetris and Grand Theft Auto V with over 300,000,000 copies sold.
