= Minecraft (disambiguation) =

Minecraft is a 2011 sandbox video game developed by Mojang Studios.

Minecraft may also refer to:

- Minecraft (franchise), a franchise based around the game
  - Minecraft (book), a 2013 book about the game and its creator Markus "Notch" Persson
  - A Minecraft Movie, a 2025 live action film based on the video game
  - Lego Minecraft, Lego figures that are based on Minecraft game elements
  - Minecraft: The Story of Mojang, a 2012 documentary about the game and its developer Mojang
  - Music of Minecraft, the games soundtrack
    - Minecraft – Volume Alpha, 2011 album featuring the games early soundtrack by C418
- Minecraft, Pacific Fleet, a group of minesweepers in the U.S. Navy
- Tanner Charles Minecraft, known online as SmallAnt, Canadian streamer and YouTuber

== See also ==
- Category:Minecraft
- Template:Minecraft
