= Creeper (Minecraft) =

Fictional Minecraft species

- Minecraft race
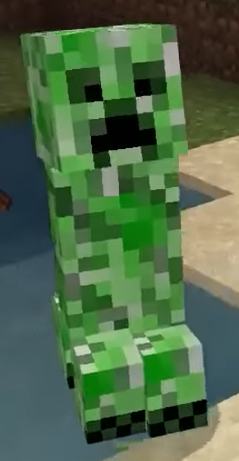
- A Creeper in Minecraft gameplay
- First appearance: 0.24_SURVIVAL_TEST (2009)
- Created by: Markus Persson

In-universe information
- Home world: The Overworld
- Type: Monster

The Creeper is a fictional creature created by Markus "Notch" Persson that appears in the sandbox video game Minecraft and other media in the corresponding Minecraft franchise. It is a hostile mob (mobile non-player character) resembling a four-legged, greenish monster that can spawn in dark places and, instead of attacking directly unlike other monsters, creeps up on the player before exploding, destroying blocks in the surrounding area and potentially hurting or killing the player if they are within the blast radius. Creepers use camouflage and generally silent behavior to aid in their stealth attacks on players, and their explosive power and unpredictability make the Creeper one of the most dangerous mobs in Minecraft.

Due to a software bug when creating the pig mob, the character model that became the Creeper was first added to Minecraft in a pre-alpha update to the game that was released on August 20, 2009. Having accidentally swapped the length and height of the pig mob, Persson chose not to remove the error and decided to keep it for a "creepy creature". On September 1 of that year, Creepers were introduced in a pre-alpha version of the game.

The Creeper has become one of the most widely recognized icons of Minecraft, where the character would go on to have new updates, including having the ability to turn into an amplified form named the "Charged Creeper" when struck by lightning. It appears prominently in Minecraft merchandising and advertising, has been referenced and parodied in popular culture, and was ranked in lists of famous fictional characters, one of which includes the Guinness World Records Gamer's Edition's list of "top 50 video game villains".

== Conception and design ==
The character model that later became the Creeper was first created on August 20, 2009, as a result of a coding error when creating the pig mob in the early pre-alpha stages of Minecraft's development. The game's creator, Markus Persson, accidentally mixed up the dimensions of the model, swapping the length and height. Instead of deleting the result, Persson instead stated "I'll keep it for a creepy creature", and later added a green texture based on the in-game leaves texture to the model, gave it an aggressive AI, and turned it into a hostile mob. The Creeper was added to the game on September 1, 2009, on a pre-alpha version named 0.24_SURVIVAL_TEST.

In Minecraft, the player exists in a large world made up of blocks. The world contains a number of enemies (hostile mobs), of which Creepers are commonly encountered. A Creeper is nearly silent until it comes near the player, at which point it emits a hiss and explodes after a short delay. The explosion destroys the Creeper, can kill or injure the player, and also typically destroys surrounding blocks.

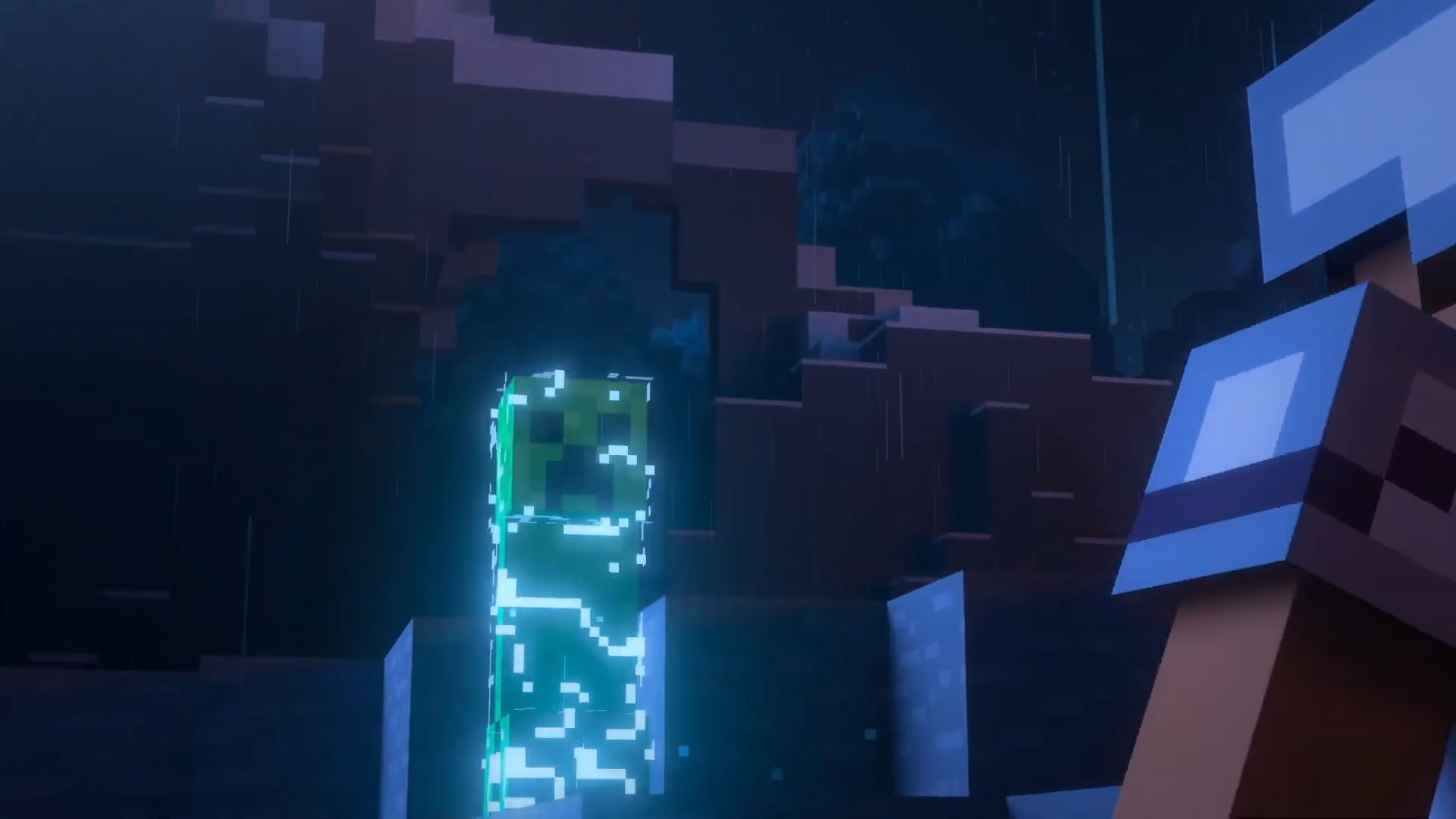
A Charged Creeper as depicted in a Minecraft update trailer

In later updates, the Minecraft developers decided that creepers "weren't quite unpredictable enough", and added the ability for creepers to become "Charged Creepers" when struck by lightning. Charged Creepers have amplified explosion power and can cause other specific mobs killed in the blast to drop their heads (other creepers, zombies, skeletons, and piglins). These heads can then be worn by the player, putting the head's model on them to look like that mob.

The destructiveness and unpredictability of Creepers was coined very early in development, during the Minecraft Classic stage. Overtime, Mojang Studios have changed their game design approach, with the guiding principle that all events that negatively affect the player should be a direct consequence of the player's own actions or lack of countermeasures against clearly foreseeable events. Lead designer Jens Bergensten stated that creepers would be unlikely to have been added to modern Minecraft, as he thinks it would be "controversial" to have player-made structures potentially damaged or destroyed, though reassuring that the mob will not be removed due to its iconic status.

== Appearances ==
The Creeper originally appeared in Minecraft in an early pre-alpha update as a common hostile mob that silently approaches players, hisses, then explodes. It appeared later in Minecraft spin-off games such as Minecraft: Story Mode, Minecraft Dungeons, Minecraft Legends, the discontinued Minecraft Earth, the upcoming Minecraft Blast, and the film adaption A Minecraft Movie (2025).

Outside of Minecraft, it also appeared in Terraria (2011), Torchlight II (2012), Borderlands 2 (2012), Octodad: Dadliest Catch (2014), and in Nintendo's crossover fighting game Super Smash Bros. Ultimate (2018), where the Creeper has been featured as a Mii Brawler costume. A Creeper is set to appear as a playable character in Sonic Racing: CrossWorlds.

== Promotion and reception ==
The Creeper image has been used on a wide variety of Minecraft merchandise, including clothing, bedding, and lamps. In July 2020, a joint partnership between Mojang Studios and Kellogg's led to the announcement of Minecraft Creeper Crunch, an official Minecraft-branded cereal prominently featuring a Creeper on the packaging. It was set to be available for release in stores in the United States in August 2020. Every packet additionally includes a unique code which can be redeemed for a Minecraft cosmetic clothing item.

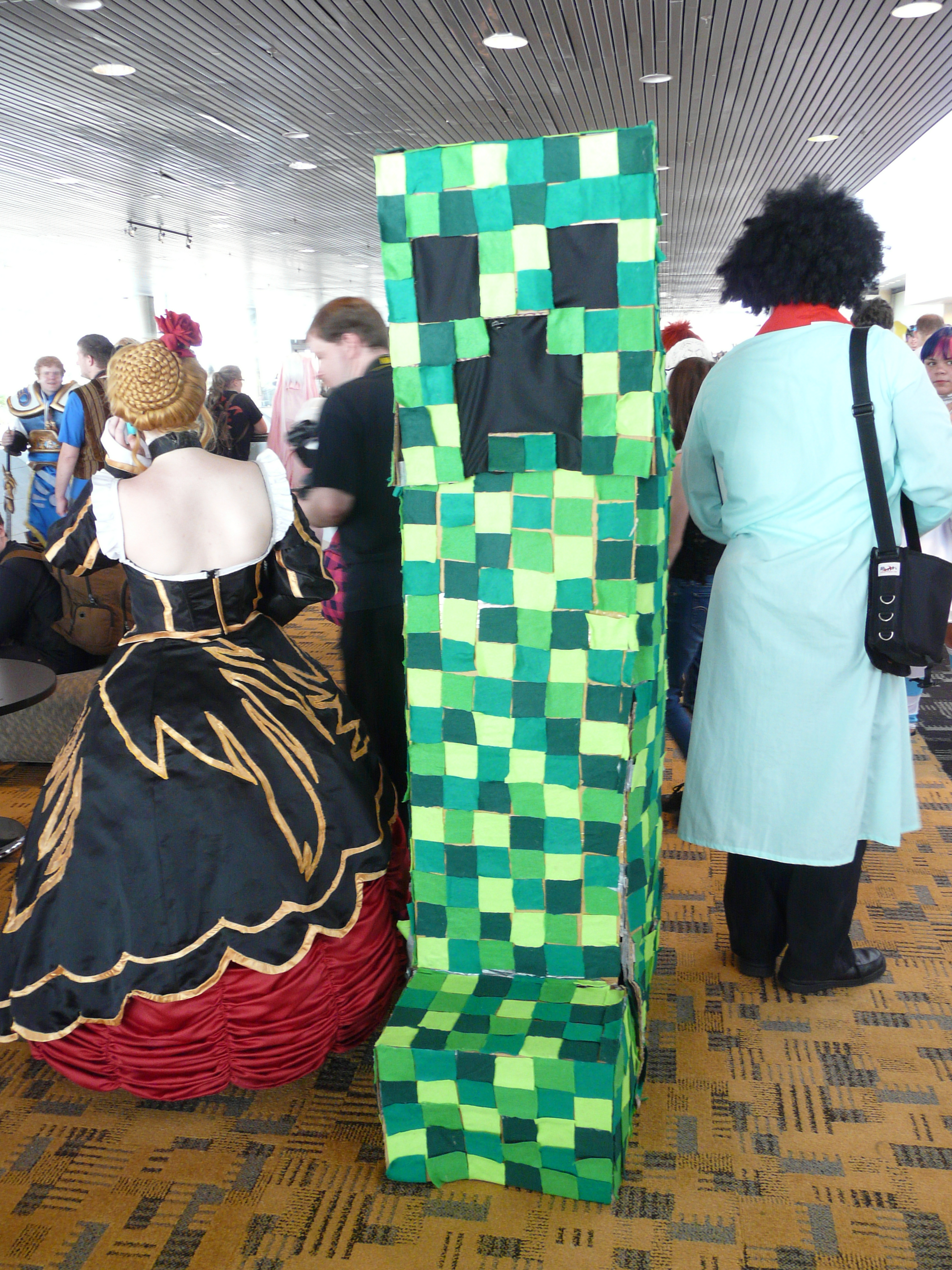
A person cosplaying as a Creeper

The creeper is considered to be one of Minecraft's most iconic enemies and icons. The pixelated face of the Creeper has been integrated into the letter "A" of the Minecraft logo, as well as being used in numerous Halloween costumes and cosplays. Guinness World Records Gamer's Edition listed the Creeper as tenth in their list of "top 50 video game villains". The Creeper has been featured in multiple Lego Minecraft sets and has been the main focus of one. In 2021, PC Gamer ranked creeper as 9th of "the 50 most iconic characters in PC gaming", stating that "The Creeper is the star of Minecraft, which is ironic considering that the Creeper's effectiveness hinges upon not being seen."

In an article for Games and Culture, Daniel Dooghan characterized the Creeper as "resistance personified", using its role in the game to draw comparison to real-world terrorism and how society reacts to such. More directly drawing parallels to real world suicide bombers through the ideology of "Self-annihilation is the ultimate form of resistance", its not human like appearance coupled with the semblance of a permanently scowling face further made it represent "otherness" in the game's world. While he acknowledged it was impossible to know the creature's actual motivations he felt it characterized the game world's rejection of the player, and impels them towards technological advancement and resource gathering due to frequent interaction and the consequences of such interaction.

Creepers have been the subject of numerous pop culture references and parodies. In the season 25 episode "Luca$" of the animated sitcom The Simpsons, Moe Szyslak appears as a creeper and explodes at the end of the theme song's "couch gag". On August 19, 2011, Jordan Maron (also known as the YouTuber CaptainSparklez) released the song "Revenge", a parody of "DJ Got Us Fallin' in Love", depicting a Minecraft player seeking revenge against creepers. The song regained popularity as an internet meme around July 2019.
