= Lego Minecraft =

Series of products by Danish toy manufacturer Lego

- Subject: Minecraft
- Licensed from: Mojang Studios
- Availability: June 1, 2012–present
- Total sets: 200 (as of November 2026)
- Official website

Lego Minecraft (stylized as LEGO Minecraft) is a Lego theme based on the sandbox game Minecraft. The theme was first introduced in 2012.

== Overview ==
The earlier "Micro World" sets feature a group of four interlocking scenes that can be rearranged, with two having a removable surface with caves containing ores, underground rivers, and a Minecart track, it also includes characters (referred to by Lego as Micromobs) which can be moved around like normal Lego.

The later sets feature brick-built locations with simple pieces (in order to remain faithful to Minecraft's blocky aesthetics), often on base plates raised by bricks, to allow for inter-connectivity with other sets. These sets are all of a minifigure scale, with custom molds for the character heads, tools and certain body parts (for example the Creeper, which consists of primarily a single molded piece for its torso and legs).

== Development ==
=== Microworlds ===
When asked about Lego Minecraft's beginnings, Mojang chief executive officer Carl Manneh stated that "it was one of the first things we talked about when we started Mojang." Mojang started the project on the "Lego Ideas" program, which required ten thousand signatures for the project to be approved. With the strong support of the Minecraft community, the signature objective was achieved within 2 days, and the development of the Lego Minecraft set commenced after Lego reviewed the project. The first Micro-World set was released on June 6, 2012. Portions of the sales proceeds went to a charity of Lego's choosing. On July 17, 2013, it was announced that two additional Micro-World sets would be added to the Minecraft theme based on the "Nether" and "Village" areas of the game. They were first shown at San Diego Comic-Con and released September 1, 2013. The fourth and final Micro-World set exploring "The End" region was released in summer 2014.

=== Minifigures ===
Minifigure sized Lego sets were then later announced in 2014. The prototypes of Creepers, mine carts, and sheep were all being developed as part of a Co-Build Project announced after Minecon, a fan convention. The initial group of 6 minifigure-scaled sets including the First Night, the Mine, the Ender Dragon, Crafting Box, the Farm and the Cave were released from November to December 2014. As of now, there are 43 Minifig-Scale that have been released with more on the way. At EGX 2025 in London, Lego unveiled eight new Minecraft sets scheduled for release on 1 January 2026. Among the new elements was a fox head piece, which appeared in sets including Steve's Taiga Adventure (21583) and Chicken Farm (21585). Previously, fox characters had been built with a cat head piece; design manager Joe Kyde said the team had noticed fan disappointment with that approach.

=== Bigfigs ===
In 2019, Lego introduced Minecraft Bigfigs which are Big brick built figures based on Minecraft mobs similar to Lego Construction figures like Bionicle, Knights Kingdom II, etc. So far there have been five Bigfigs released consisting of Bigfig Steve with Parrot, Bigfig Alex with Chicken, Bigfig Skeleton with Magma Cube, Bigfig Creeper and Ocelot, and Bigfig Pig with Baby Zombie, with a Series 3 unlikely to be released.

== Launch ==
Following the released of Minecraft Micro World (set number: 21102) for Lego Cuusoo in 2012, the Lego Minecraft theme revealed at San Diego Comic-Con and was launched in September 2013. As part of a marketing campaign, the Lego Group released two sets based on Minecraft.

== Toy line ==
=== Construction sets ===
According to BrickLink and Brickset, The Lego Group released 177 playsets and promotional polybags as part of the Lego Minecraft theme.

Number	Name	Pieces	Minifigs.	Theme - subtheme	Year	Clip notes
21102-1	Minecraft: Micro World: The Forest	480		Ideas - Licensed	2012	Includes Micromob Steve and Creeper
21105-1	The Village	466		Minecraft - Micro World	2013	Includes Micromob Villager, Zombie, and Pig
21106-1	The Nether	469		Minecraft - Micro World	2013	Includes Micromob Zombie Pigman and 2 Micromob Ghasts
21107-1	The End	440		Minecraft - Micro World	2014	Includes 4 Micromob Endermen The last Micro World Build
21113-1	The Cave	249	2	Minecraft - Minifig-scale	2014	Includes brick-built Spider and Zombie
21114-1	The Farm	262	2	Minecraft - Minifig-scale	2014	Includes brick-built Cow and Sheep
21115-1	The First Night	408	2	Minecraft - Minifig-scale	2014	Includes brick-built Pig
21116-1	Crafting Box	518	2	Minecraft - Minifig-scale	2014	Includes brick-built Mooshroom
21117-1	The Ender Dragon	634	4	Minecraft - Minifig-scale	2014	Includes brick-built Ender Dragon
21118-1	The Mine	922	4	Minecraft - Minifig-scale	2014	Includes brick-built Spider
21119-1	The Dungeon	219	3	Minecraft - Minifig-scale	2015	
21120-1	The Snow Hideout	327	3	Minecraft - Minifig-scale	2015	
21121-1	The Desert Outpost	519	4	Minecraft - Minifig-scale	2015	Includes brick-built Dog
21122-1	The Nether Fortress	571	4	Minecraft - Minifig-scale	2015	Includes brick-built Ghast
21123-1	The Iron Golem	208	2	Minecraft - Minifig-scale	2016	Includes brick-built Iron Golem and baby Pig
21124-1	The End Portal	559	3	Minecraft - Minifig-scale	2016	Includes brick-built Cave Spider
21125-1	The Jungle Tree House	706	4	Minecraft - Minifig-scale	2016	Includes brick-built Ocelot and Sheep
21126-1	The Wither	318	3	Minecraft - Minifig-scale	2016	Includes brick-built Wither
21127-1	The Fortress	984	4	Minecraft - Minifig-scale	2016	Includes brick-built Horse and Sheep
21128-1	The Village	1600	8	Minecraft - Minifig-scale	2016	Includes brick-built Iron Golem, Pig, and baby Pig
21129-1	The Mushroom Island	247	2	Minecraft - Minifig-scale	2017	Includes brick-built Mooshroom and baby Mooshroom
21130-1	The Nether Railway	387	2	Minecraft - Minifig-scale	2017	Includes brick-built Magma Cube and a tiny Magma Cube
21131-1	The Ice Spikes	454	2	Minecraft - Minifig-scale	2017	Includes brick-built Spider and baby Cow
21132-1	Jungle Temple	598	3	Minecraft - Minifig-scale	2017	Includes brick-built Ocelot
21133-1	The Witch Hut	502	2	Minecraft - Minifig-scale	2017	Includes brick-built Pig and 3 tiny Slimes
21134-1	The Waterfall Base	729	4	Minecraft - Minifig-scale	2017	Includes brick-built Cat and Sheep
21135-1	The Crafting Box 2.0	717	2	Minecraft - Minifig-scale	2017	Includes brick-built Horse, Cow, and tiny Slime
21136-1	The Ocean Monument	1122	2	Minecraft - Minifig-scale	2017	Includes brick-built Guardian, Elder Guardian, and Squid
21137-1	The Mountain Cave	2863	6	Minecraft - Minifig-scale	2017	Includes brick-built Cave Spider, Wolf, baby Wolf, Sheep, Slime, 2 tiny Slimes, and 2 brick-built Bats
21138-1	The Melon Farm	69	3	Minecraft - Minifig-scale	2018	Includes brick-built Pig
21139-1	The Nether Fight	84	3	Minecraft - Minifig-scale	2018	
21140-1	The Chicken Coop	198	1	Minecraft - Minifig-scale	2018	Includes brick-built Dog, baby Chicken, and 2 brick-built Chickens
21141-1	The Zombie Cave	241	3	Minecraft - Minifig-scale	2018	Includes brick-built Bat, Zombie and Baby Zombie
21142-1	The Polar Igloo	278	2	Minecraft - Minifig-scale	2018	Includes brick-built Polar Bear and baby Polar Bear
21143-1	The Nether Portal	470	3	Minecraft - Minifig-scale	2018	Includes brick-built Ghast and a tiny Magma Cube
21144-1	The Farm Cottage	549	3	Minecraft - Minifig-scale	2018	Includes brick-built Horse, Rabbit, baby Rabbit, and baby Pig
21145-1	The Skull Arena	198	2	Minecraft - Minifig-scale	2018	Includes brick-built Killer Bunny First Minecraft set excluding Skin Packs to include non-default Minecraft skins
21146-1	The Skeleton Attack	457	4	Minecraft - Minifig-scale	2018	Includes brick-built Skeleton Horse and Sheep
21147-1	The Bedrock Adventures	644	4	Minecraft - Minifig-scale	2018	Includes brick-built Cave Spider, and 2 Silverfish
21148-1	Minecraft Steve BigFig with Parrot	159		Minecraft - Bigfigs Series 1	2019	The first set in the BigFig series
21149-1	Minecraft Alex BigFig with Chicken	160		Minecraft - Bigfigs Series 1	2019	
21150-1	Minecraft Skeleton BigFig with Magma Cube	142		Minecraft - Bigfigs Series 1	2019	
21151-1	The End Battle	222	2	Minecraft - Minifig-scale	2019	Includes brick-built Ender Dragon and Enderman A 2x4 Lego brick in the set contained a code so players could unlock a skin in-game only in the Minecraft: Bedrock Edition
21152-1	Pirate Ship	386	3	Minecraft - Minifig-scale	2019	Includes brick-built Turtle, Dolphin, and Parrot
21153-1	The Wool Farm	260	1	Minecraft - Minifig-scale	2019	Includes 2 brick-built Sheep and a brick-built baby Sheep
21154-1	The Blaze Bridge	372	4	Minecraft - Minifig-scale	2019	
21155-1	The Creeper Mine	834	5	Minecraft - Minifig-scale	2019	Includes brick-built Cow and Bat
21156-1	BigFig Creeper and Ocelot	184		Minecraft - Bigfigs Series 2	2020	
21157-1	BigFig Pig with Baby Zombie	159		Minecraft - Bigfigs Series 2	2020	
21158-1	The Panda Nursery	204	1	Minecraft - Minifig-scale	2020	Includes brick-built Panda, baby Panda, and Ocelot
21159-1	The Pillager Outpost	303	3	Minecraft - Minifig-scale	2020	Includes brick-built Iron Golem and Sheep
21160-1	The Illager Raid	562	5	Minecraft - Minifig-scale	2020	Includes brick-built Ravager, Cat, and Pig The Minecraft player is Kai from Lego Ninjago. Also the mobs that raid villages in Minecraft 1.14 are part of the villager species, but they are referred to in the game as pillagers.
21161-1	The Crafting Box 3.0	564	3	Minecraft - Minifig-scale	2020	Includes brick-built Creeper and Pig
21162-1	The Taiga Adventure	74	2	Minecraft - Minifig-scale	2020	Includes brick-built Fox and Dog
21163-1	The Redstone Battle	492	4	Minecraft - Minifig-scale	2020	Includes two brick-built redstone golems and a pig. The set is related to the video game, Minecraft Dungeons.
21164-1	The Coral Reef	85	2	Minecraft - Minifig-scale	2021	Includes two pufferfishes; one unswollen and other swollen
21165-1	The Bee Farm	229	2	Minecraft - Minifig-scale	2020	Includes 7 bees and 1 baby sheep.
21166-1	The "Abandoned" Mine	242	2	Minecraft - Minifig-scale	2020	Includes a brick-built spider
30393-1	Steve and Creeper Set	36	2	Minecraft - Minifig-scale	2019	Promotional Set
30394-1	The Skeleton Defense	31	2	Minecraft-Minifig-scale	2020	
853609-1	Skin Pack	25	4	Minecraft - Miscellaneous	2016	
853610-1	Skin Pack	28	4	Minecraft - Miscellaneous	2016	
MINECON-1	Steve	19	13	Minecraft - Miscellaneous	2013	Minecon 2013 Exclusive
21176-1	The Jungle Abomination	489	5		2021	Includes Charged Creeper, Skeleton, Iron Golem, Minecraft explorer, and archaeologist
21167-1	The Trading Post	189	3	Minecraft - Minifig-scale	2020	
21168-1	The Warped Forest	276	3	Minecraft - Minifig-scale	2021	
21169-1	The First Adventure	524	4	Minecraft - Minifig-scale	2021	
21170-1	The Pig House	483	2	Minecraft - Minifig-scale	2021	
21171-1	The Horse Stable	231	2	Minecraft - Minifig-scale	2021	
21172-1	The Ruined Portal	305	2	Minecraft - Minifig-scale	2021	
21173-1	The Sky Tower	558	1	Minecraft - Minifig-scale	2021	
21174-1	The Modern Treehouse	894	4	Minecraft - Minifig-scale	2021	
21177-1	The Creeper Ambush	72	2	Minecraft - Minifig-scale	2022	Includes Exploding Creeper, which is unique to this set
21178-1	The Fox Lodge	193	2	Minecraft - Minifig-scale	2022	Fox Skin Minifig is unique to this set
21179-1	The Mushroom House	272	2	Minecraft - Minifig-scale	2022	Includes brick-built Mooshroom and Spider
21180-1	The Guardian Battle	251	1	Minecraft - Minifig-scale	2022	Includes Diver, three different colored axolotls, brick-built Guardian and Elder Guardian
21181-1	The Rabbit Ranch	334	2	Minecraft - Minifig-scale	2022	Includes two brick-built rabbits
21183-1	The Training Grounds	522	3	Minecraft - Minifig-scale	2022	
21184-1	The Bakery	143	3	Minecraft - Minifig-scale	2022	
21185-1	The Nether Bastion	290	3	Minecraft - Minifig-scale	2022	
21186-1	The Ice Castle	474	6	Minecraft - Minifig-scale	2022	
21187-1	The Red Barn	790	3	Minecraft - Minifig-scale	2022	
21188-1	The Llama Village	1232	6	Minecraft - Minifig-scale	2022	
21189-1	The Skeleton Dungeon	342	4	Minecraft - Minifig-scale	2022	
21190-1	The Abandoned Village	412	3	Minecraft - Minifig-scale	2022	
21240-1	The Swamp Adventure	59	2	Minecraft - Minifig-scale	2023	
21241-1	The Bee Cottage	249	2	Minecraft - Minifig-scale	2023	
21242-1	The End Arena	230	3	Minecraft - Minifig-scale	2023	
21243-1	The Frozen Peaks	288	3	Minecraft - Minifig-scale	2023	
21244-1	The Sword Outpost	403	5	Minecraft - Minifig-scale	2023	
21245-1	The Panda Haven	544	2	Minecraft - Minifig-scale	2023	
21246-1	The Deep Dark Battle	508	3	Minecraft - Minifig-scale	2023	
21247-1	The Axolotl House	236	2	Minecraft - Minifig-scale	2023	
21248-1	The Pumpkin Farm	250	2	Minecraft - Minifig-scale	2023	
21249-1	The Crafting Box 4.0	591	4	Minecraft - Minifig-scale	2023	
21250-1	The Iron Golem Fortress	799	6	Minecraft - Minifig-scale	2023	
21251-1	Steve's Desert Expedition	72	1	Minecraft - Minifig-scale	2023	
21252-1	The Armory	196	2	Minecraft - Minifig-scale	2023	
21253-1	The Animal Sanctuary	201	2	Minecraft - Minifig-scale	2023	
21254-1	The Turtle Beach House	227	2	Minecraft - Minifig-scale	2024	
21255-1	The Nether Portal Ambush	349	1	Minecraft - Minifig-scale	2024	
21256-1	The Frog House	391	3	Minecraft - Minifig-scale	2024	
21257-1	The Devourer Showdown	388	4	Minecraft - Minifig-scale	2024	The set is related to the video game, Minecraft Legends.
21259-1	The Pirate Ship Voyage	160	2	Minecraft - Minifig-scale	2024	
21260-1	The Cherry Blossom Garden	298	2	Minecraft - Minifig-scale	2024	
21261-1	The Wolf Stronghold	296	3	Minecraft - Minifig-scale	2024	
21262-1	The Windmill Farm	451	3	Minecraft - Minifig-scale	2024	
21263-1	The Badlands Mineshaft	528	3	Minecraft - Minifig-scale	2024	
21264-1	The Ender Dragon and End Ship	633	3	Minecraft - Minifig-scale	2024	
21265-1	The Crafting Table	1179	6	Minecraft - Micromob-scale	2024	The first 18+ set of this theme
21266-1	The Nether Lava Battle	74	3	Minecraft - Minifig-scale	2025	
21267-1	The Illager Desert Patrol	86	4	Minecraft - Minifig-scale	2025	
21268-1	The Baby Pig House	232	2	Minecraft - Minifig-scale	2025	
21269-1	The Armadillo Mine Expedition	243	1	Minecraft - Minifig-scale	2025	
21270-1	The Mooshroom House	497	1	Minecraft - Minifig-scale	2025	
21271-1	The Trial Chamber	271	5	Minecraft - Minifig-scale	2025	
21272-1	Woodland Mansion Fighting Ring	372	5	Minecraft - Minifig-scale	2025	
21273-1	The Ghast Balloon Village Attack	491	7	Minecraft - Minifig-scale	2025	
21274-1	The Warden Encounter	167	2	Minecraft - Minifig-scale	2025	
21275-1	The TNT Jungle House	277	3	Minecraft - Minifig-scale	2025	
21276-1	The Creeper	658	1	Minecraft - Brick-Built-Display-scale	2025	
21277-1	The Pickaxe Mine	517	3	Minecraft - Minifig-scale	2025	
21278-1	The Pillager Outpost and Ravager	651	4	Minecraft - Minifig-scale	2025	
21279-1	The Enderman Tower	832	4	Minecraft - Minifig-scale	2025	
21280-1	Advent Calendar 2025	300	7	Minecraft - Minifig-scale	2025	The first Advent Calendar of this theme
21281-1	Baby Pig's Birthday Celebration	351		Minecraft - Minifig-scale	2024	The first BigFig-scale set since BigFig Pig and Baby Zombie
21282-1	The Parrot Houses	523	3	Minecraft - Minifig-scale	2025	Includes four parrots; two being all three primary colors at once, mostly red, and the other two green
21582-1	Chicken Jockey	344	0	Minecraft - Brick-Built-Display-scale	2026	
21583-1	Steve's Taiga Adventure	79	2	Minecraft - Minifig-scale	2026	Includes an updated Fox, and a Bunny
21584-1	Nether & End Portal Journey	192	2	Minecraft - Minifig-scale	2026	Includes an updated Baby Hoglin
21585-1	Chicken Farm	233	2	Minecraft - Minifig-scale	2026	Includes a Cold Chicken Jockey and an updated Fox
21586-1	The Pale Garden	243	4	Minecraft - Minifig-scale	2026	The first appearance of Creaking
21587-1	Zombie Dungeon	284	4	Minecraft - Minifig-scale	2026	Includes a hazmat-suit-inspired minifigure, three Zombies, and a Slime
21588-1	The Fox	497		Minecraft - Brick-Built-Display-scale	2026	
21589-1	Mini Biomes	797		Minecraft - Micromob-scale	2026	
21590-1	Wither Battle	494	4	Minecraft - Minifig-Scale	2026	Includes a Wither and two brick-built Striders (one baby, the other adult)
21591-1	The Twisted Warden Battle	438	4	Minecraft - Minifig-Scale	2026	This set is based on the game Minecraft Dungeons II.
21592-1	Chicken Jockey Desert Attack	428		Minecraft - BigFig-Scale	2026	
21593-1	First Night Adventure	301	3	Minecraft - Minifig-Scale	2026	Includes the forest variant of Wolf, and the cold Pig
21594-1	The Skeleton	502		Minecraft - Brick-Built-Display-Scale	2026	
21595-1	The Ender Dragon (2026)	710		Minecraft - Minifig-Scale	2026	
21596-1	Evoker Village Attack	607	3	Minecraft-Minifig-Scale	2026	Includes an Evoker and Vexes
21597-1	Ghast Station	754	4	Minecraft - Minifig-Scale	2026	Includes a Happy Ghast and Ghastling
21598-1	Underwater Adventure	310	2	Minecraft - Minifig-scale	2026	Includes a Deep-Sea Diver, two brick-built guardians (one regular, one elder), Steve in full enchanted armor, Dolphin, and Tropical Fish
30331-1	The Nether Duel	28	2	Minecraft - Minifig-scale	2021	
30432-1	The Turtle Beach	43	1	Minecraft - Minifig-scale	2022	
30647-1	The Dripstone Cavern	38	2	Minecraft - Minifig-scale	2023	
30672-1	Steve and Baby Panda	32	1	Minecraft - Minifig-scale	2024	
30705-1	The Lush Cave Fight	31	2	Minecraft - Minifig-scale	2025	
472506-1	Gold Hunter with Crafting Table, Furnace and Anvil	15	1	Minecraft - Minifig-scale	2025	
5004192-1	Minecraft Collection			Minecraft - Minifig-scale	2014	A collection of the first four sets in the theme
5004818-1	Minecraft Collection			Minecraft - Minifig-scale	2015	A collection of the first four sets released in 2015
662101-1	Steve, Zombie and Pig	9	2	Minecraft - Minifig-scale	2021	
662102-1	TNT Launcher and Skeleton	20	1	Minecraft - Minifig-scale	2022	
662103-1	Alex with Ocelot and Sheep	20	1	Minecraft - Minifig-scale	2022	
662203-1	Iron Golem	20	1	Minecraft - Minifig-scale	2022	
662204-1	Miner and Creeper	20	2	Minecraft - Minifig-scale	2022	
662205-1	Steve with Drowned	19	2	Minecraft - Minifig-scale	2022	
662206-1	Alex with Skeleton Horseman	31	2	Minecraft - Minifig-scale	2022	
662207-1	Steve with Spider	16	1	Minecraft - Minifig-scale	2022	
662302-1	Cave Explorer, Creeper and Slime	23	2	Minecraft - Minifig-scale	2023	
662303-1	Adventurer with Drowned and Axolotl	6	2	Minecraft - Minifig-scale	2023	
662304-1	Ninja, Zombie and TNT Launcher	15	2	Minecraft - Minifig-scale	2023	
662305-1	Nether Hero and Enderman	2	2	Minecraft - Minifig-scale	2023	
662306-1	Pillager with Training Dummy	24	1	Minecraft - Minifig-scale	2023	
662307-1	Spider Jockey	24	1	Minecraft - Minifig-scale	2023	
662308-1	Alex, Baby Llama and Bee	32	1	Minecraft - Minifig-scale	2023	
662309-1	Knight with Chest and Anvil	12	1	Minecraft - Minifig-scale	2023	
662317-1	Steve with Diamond Armor	17	1	Minecraft - Minifig-scale	2023	
662401-1	Stray, Crystal Knight and Shooter	8	2	Minecraft - Minifig-scale	2024	
662402-1	Nether Hero and Strider	32	1	Minecraft - Minifig-scale	2024	
662403-1	Zombie with Burning Baby Zombie and TNT	7	2	Minecraft - Minifig-scale	2024	
662404-1	Alex with Wolf	22	1	Minecraft - Minifig-scale	2024	
662405-1	Drowned and Hero	4	2	Minecraft - Minifig-scale	2024	
662406-1	Hero with Charged Creeper and TNT Launcher	14	2	Minecraft - Minifig-scale	2024	
662407-1	Steve with Mooshroom	36	1	Minecraft - Minifig-scale	2024	
662408-1	Witch with Black Cat and Potion	19	1	Minecraft - Minifig-scale	2024	
662409-1	Hero with Skeleton	11	2	Minecraft - Minifig-scale	2024	
662410-1	Cave Explorer with Spider	16	1	Minecraft - Minifig-scale	2024	
662411-1	Steve in the Diamond Mine	34	1	Minecraft - Minifig-scale	2024	
662412-1	Arbalest Knight with Frog and Slime	12	1	Minecraft - Minifig-scale	2024	
662413-1	End Warrior with Shulker and Chorus Plant	22	1	Minecraft - Minifig-scale	2024	
662501-1	Hero with Elytra and Phantom	15	1	Minecraft - Minifig-scale	2025	
662502-1	Steve with Creeper and TNT	6	2	Minecraft - Minifig-scale	2025	
662503-1	Orc Warrior with Baby Hoglin and Magma Cube	21	1	Minecraft - Minifig-scale	2025	
662504-1	Ghast	106		Minecraft - Minifig-scale	2025	
662505-1	Diver with Treasure Chest and Turtle	23	1	Minecraft - Minifig-scale	2025	
662506-1	Wither Skeleton and Ender Explorer with TNT	16		Minecraft - Minifig-scale	2025	
662507-1	Ender Knight and Enderman	19	2	Minecraft - Minifig-scale	2025	
662508-1	Diamond Hero with Creeper and Slime	10	2	Minecraft - Minifig-scale	2025	
662509-1	Hero with Skeleton Horseman	31		Minecraft - Minifig-scale	2025	
662510-1	Hero with Zombie and TNT Launcher	21		Minecraft - Minifig-scale	2025	
662511-1	Hero with Husk	10		Minecraft - Minifig-scale	2025	
66646-1	Minecraft Bundle Pack			Minecraft - Minifig-scale	2020	
66779-1	Overworld Adventures Pack			Minecraft - Minifig-scale	2023	
66786-1	Adventure Gamer Gift Set			Minecraft - Minifig-scale	2024	

=== Lego Ideas sets ===
Minecraft Micro World (set number: 21102) was released on 1 June 2012 with a Lego Ideas theme and based on the video game Minecraft. It was the first set to start a new Lego Minecraft theme.

=== Lego BrickHeadz sets ===
Steve & Creeper (set number: 41612) was released in August 2018 as part of the Lego BrickHeadz theme and based on the Minecraft video game. The set consists of 160 pieces and 2 baseplates.

On 1 April 2023, Alex (set number: 40624), Llama (set number: 40625) and Zombie (set number: 40626) were released.

== Web shorts ==
The product line was accompanied by a series of animated short films that was released on YouTube.

- LEGO Stop Motion Animation Compilation - LEGO Minecraft - Funny Video 2017, 2018, 2019 was an official web short was released on YouTube on 23 February 2019. It features the Skeleton Gang, Bedrock Escape, Killer Bunny, the Sheep, Piggies, Mobs, Creepers and Steve.

== Reception ==
Mashable listed the first Lego Minecraft set as a creative gift for the 2012 Christmas season. Forbes magazine noted in December 2012 that the original set was sold out due to its great popularity.

In 2020, The Crafting Box 3.0 (set number: 21161) was listed in the "LEGO Christmas 2020 gift list for gamers" by Lego fansite Brick Fanatics.

== Awards and nominations ==
In 2015, The Nether Fortress (set number: 21122) was awarded "DreamToys" in the Build It And They Will Thrive category by the Toy Retailers Association.

In 2022, The Mushroom House (set number: 21179) was awarded "DreamToys" in the Video Game Inspired category by the Toy Retailers Association.

== See also ==
- Lego Overwatch
- Lego The Angry Birds Movie
- Lego Super Mario
- Lego BrickHeadz
- Lego Sonic the Hedgehog
- Lego Prince of Persia
