= Minecraft Live =

Biannual interactive livestream for Minecraft

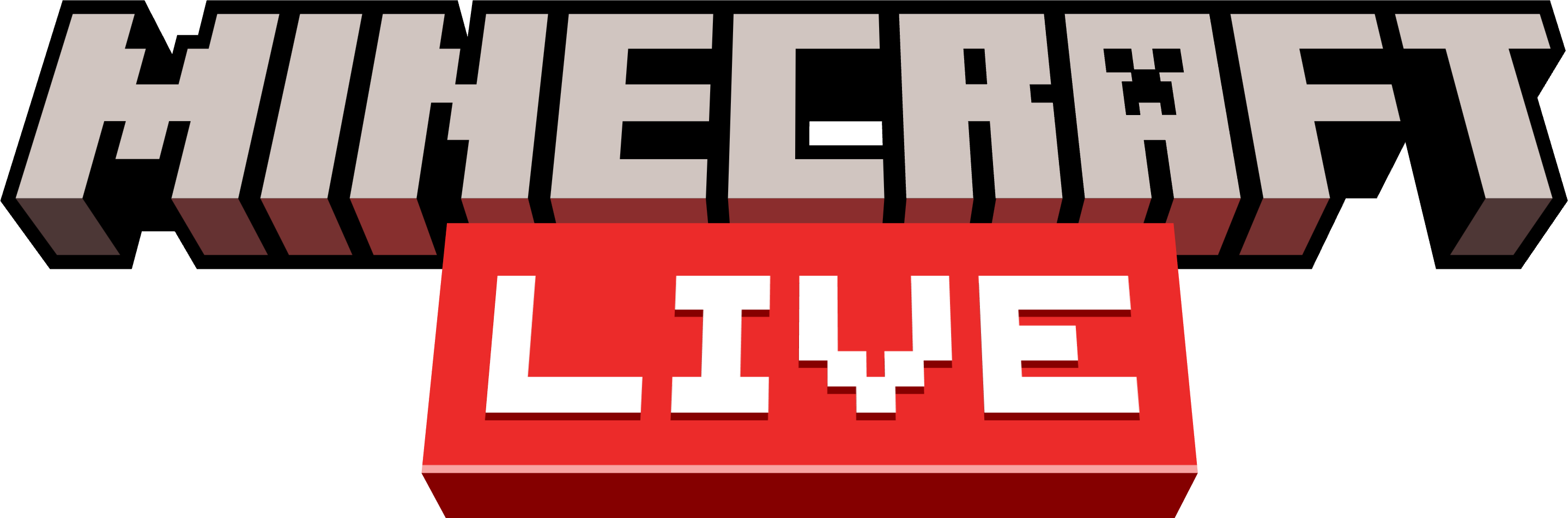
- Status: Active
- Genre: Video games
- Frequency: Bi-annual
- Venue: Various
- Inaugurated: 31 August 2010; 16 years ago (as MinecraftCon); 18 November 2011; 15 years ago (first official Minecon); 25 September 2020; 6 years ago (as the cancelled Minecraft Festival); 3 October 2020; 6 years ago (as the online Minecraft Live)
- Founder: Markus Persson
- Most recent: 26 September 2026; 55 days ago
- Organizer: Mojang Studios
- Website: minecraft.net/live

Minecraft Live is an interactive livestream about the video game Minecraft, hosted bi-annually by developer Mojang. Originally starting out as an in-person fan convention called MinecraftCon (later Minecon (Note: Called Minecon until 2016. Later Minecon Earth (2017–2018), Minecon Live (2019), and Minecraft Festival (2020–2022).) (Note: Minecon is alternatively capitalised as MineCon, or MINECON.)), the first gathering was in 2010; the event reoccurred annually until 2016 under the name Minecon. The Minecon 2011 convention was held in Las Vegas and celebrated the launch of the game with Minecraft-related discussion panels and gaming areas; the last in-person convention, Minecon 2016, held in Anaheim, had 12,000 to 14,000 attendees. The most recent event was held on 26 September 2026.

Since 2017, Minecraft Live has taken the form of an interactive livestream. The livestream was called Minecon Earth in 2017 and 2018, and was later renamed to Minecon Live in 2019 and Minecraft Live starting in 2020, where the audience was permanently removed. An attempt at returning to in-person events, called Minecraft Festival, was prevented due to the COVID-19 pandemic.

In September 2024, Mojang announced they were changing the structure of Minecraft Live. It will now broadcast twice a year, and the mob vote was retired due to controversy from the community.

== In-person events ==
Timeline of in-person Minecraft conventions
| Year | Event | Dates | Venue | City |
|---|---|---|---|---|
| 2010 | MinecraftCon | 31 August | | Bellevue, Washington |
| 2011 | MINECON | 18 November | Mandalay Bay Convention Center | Las Vegas, Nevada |
| 2012 | MINECON | 24–25 November | Disneyland Paris | Chessy, France |
| 2013 | MINECON | 2–3 November | Orange County Convention Center | Orlando, Florida |
| 2014 | MINECON | Cancelled | | |
| 2015 | MINECON | 4–5 July | ExCeL London | London, England |
| 2016 | MINECON | 24–25 September | Anaheim Convention Center | Anaheim, California |
| 2020 | Minecraft Live | 25–27 September | Postponed to 2021 | |
| 2021 | Minecraft Live | 25–27 September | Postponed to 2022 | |
| 2022 | Minecraft Live | Cancelled | | |
| 2026 | Minecraft at TwitchCon | 30-31 May | Rotterdam Ahoy | Rotterdam, Netherlands |

=== 2010 ===
MinecraftCon 2010 was a gathering of more than 30 people at Bellevue, Washington, on 31 August. The event was organized following a post on Markus Persson's blog in which he made people aware he was going to be in the area. He was aware multiple people had expressed an interest in meeting him, and called for people to suggest places where a small meeting could be held. The event would eventually take place in Bellevue Downtown Park and had a small group of people asking Persson questions about the state of Minecraft's development.

=== 2011 ===
Five thousand people attended the first official MineCon convention held in Las Vegas on 18 November. The convention focused on celebrating the game's release and hosted Minecraft-related discussion panels, and invited people to play the game with others while at the convention. There were keynote speeches from members of the community, building contests, costume contests and exhibits. One of the many events at MineCon was the "Nether Party", an event for those aged 21 and over, featuring Canadian DJ deadmau5. This event also marked the release of version 1.0 to the public, officially taking the game out of beta, as Notch pulled a giant lever. It was also the first time that the port of Minecraft for the Xbox 360 console was first shown and played outside of the development.

=== 2012 ===
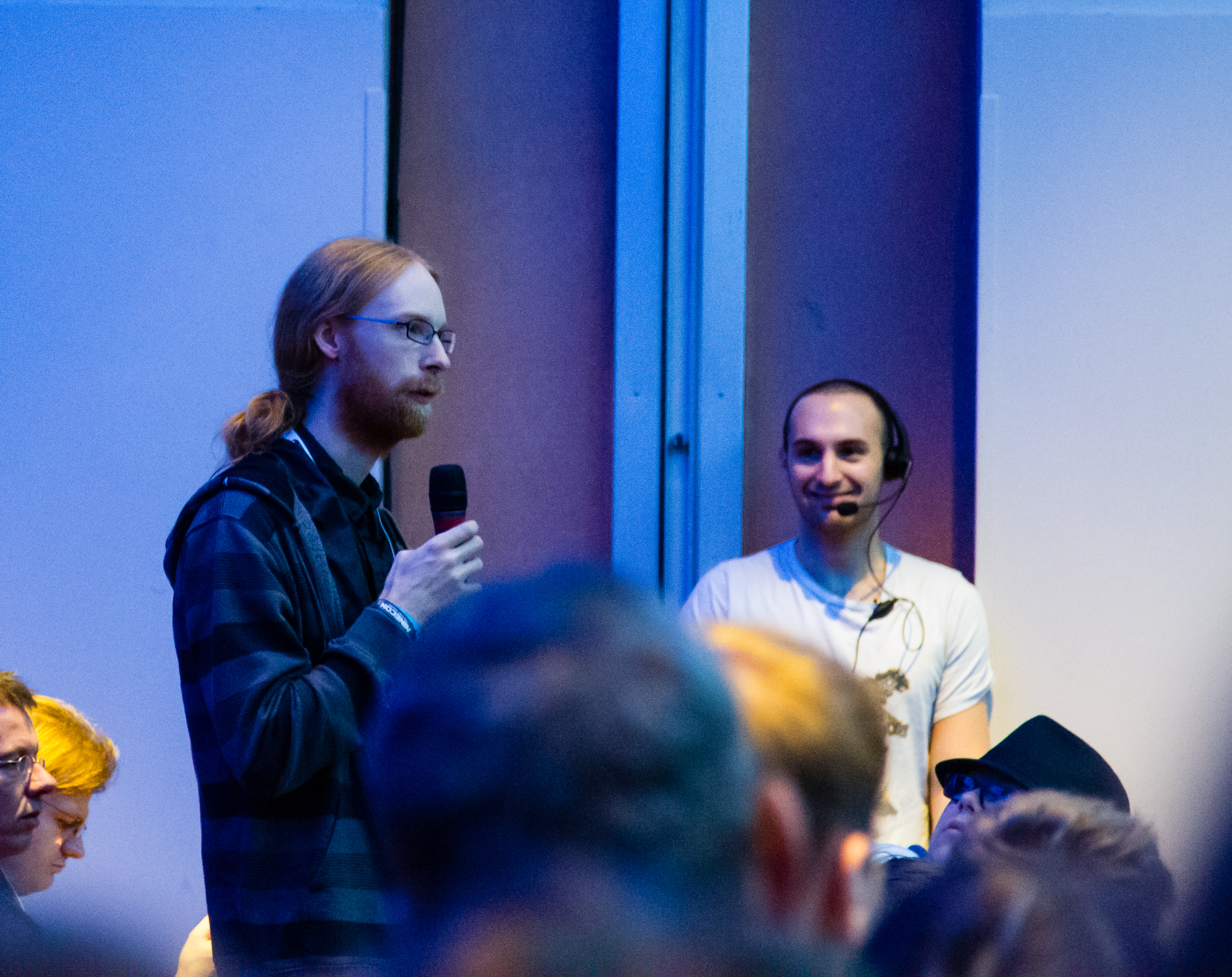
Jens "Jeb" Bergensten talking about Minecraft modding at Minecon 2012

On 2 August 2012, Mojang announced that the 2012 MineCon convention would take place at Disneyland Paris on the 24 and 25 November. The announcement was made over the social networking platform Twitter when the game's creator, Markus Persson, posted a short trailer revealing the new convention location. The video shows Mojang team members wearing Disney paraphernalia, and Persson comments to lead developer Jens Bergensten, "I think they are trying to tell us something". Joystiq's JC Fletcher said that the site was a "step up" from the first MINECON's location in Las Vegas. The second annual convention was the first held outside of the United States, making it available to European fans who might not have been able to attend the first. It was held in the wake of Minecraft's growing popularity as the Xbox 360 version of the game sold 3 million copies. 2012 was also the start of several in-game unofficial MINECONs, notably a Virtual MINECON, which although an unofficial event, was attended by a member of the Mojang Team. Many in-game MINECONs have announced an intent to return with the start of the next MINECON.

The convention in 2012 was attended by 4,500 fans. Mojang made several announcements at the 2012 convention. Details about the 1.5 "Redstone" update were revealed as well as information on the game's modding API.

=== 2013 ===
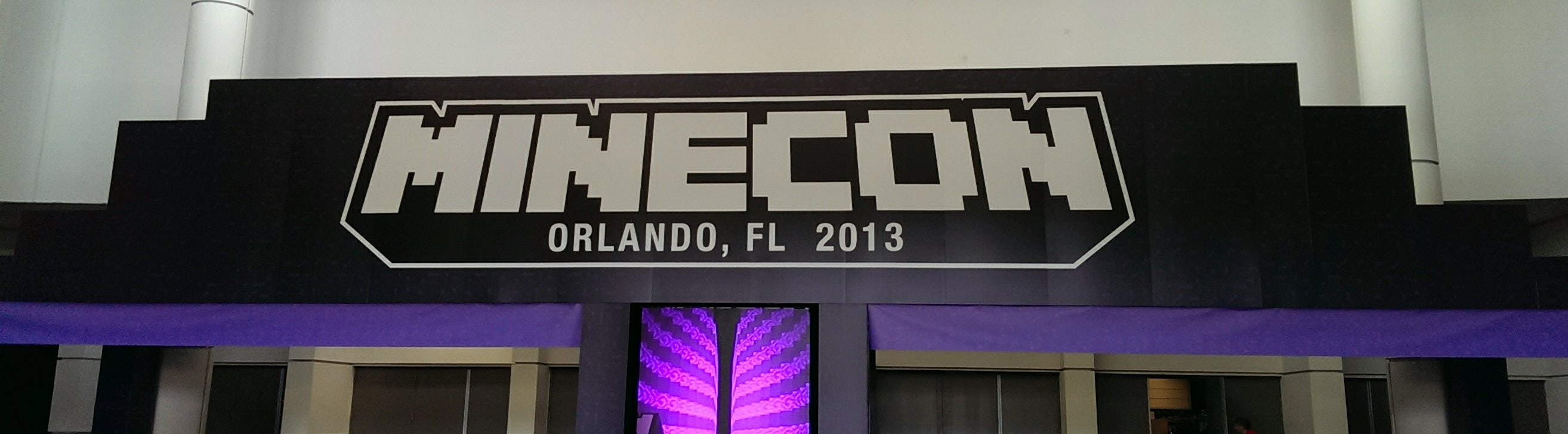
The Minecon 2013 sign

On 7 April 2013, Lydia Winters revealed that MINECON 2013 would be held in the United States. Jens Bergensten later said that it would be on the east coast. On 27 June, it was announced on Mojang's YouTube Channel that MINECON 2013 will be held in Orlando, Florida. The website for the Orange County Convention Center had listed MineCon as an upcoming event in November, with an attendance of 7,500, but then removed the event from the web page. Tickets went on sale in three batches each of 2,500 tickets on 31 July, and the 2 and 3 August. The first batch of 2,500 tickets was sold out in three seconds, according to Mojang COO Vu Bui. The event took place on 2 and 3 November.

=== 2014 (cancelled) ===
On 30 March 2014, Lydia Winters revealed in a tweet that MINECON 2014 would be held in Europe. However, on 1 August 2014, Vu Bui created a blog post, stating that there would be no MineCon 2014, but instead the next MineCon would be in Spring 2015 in London.

=== 2015 ===
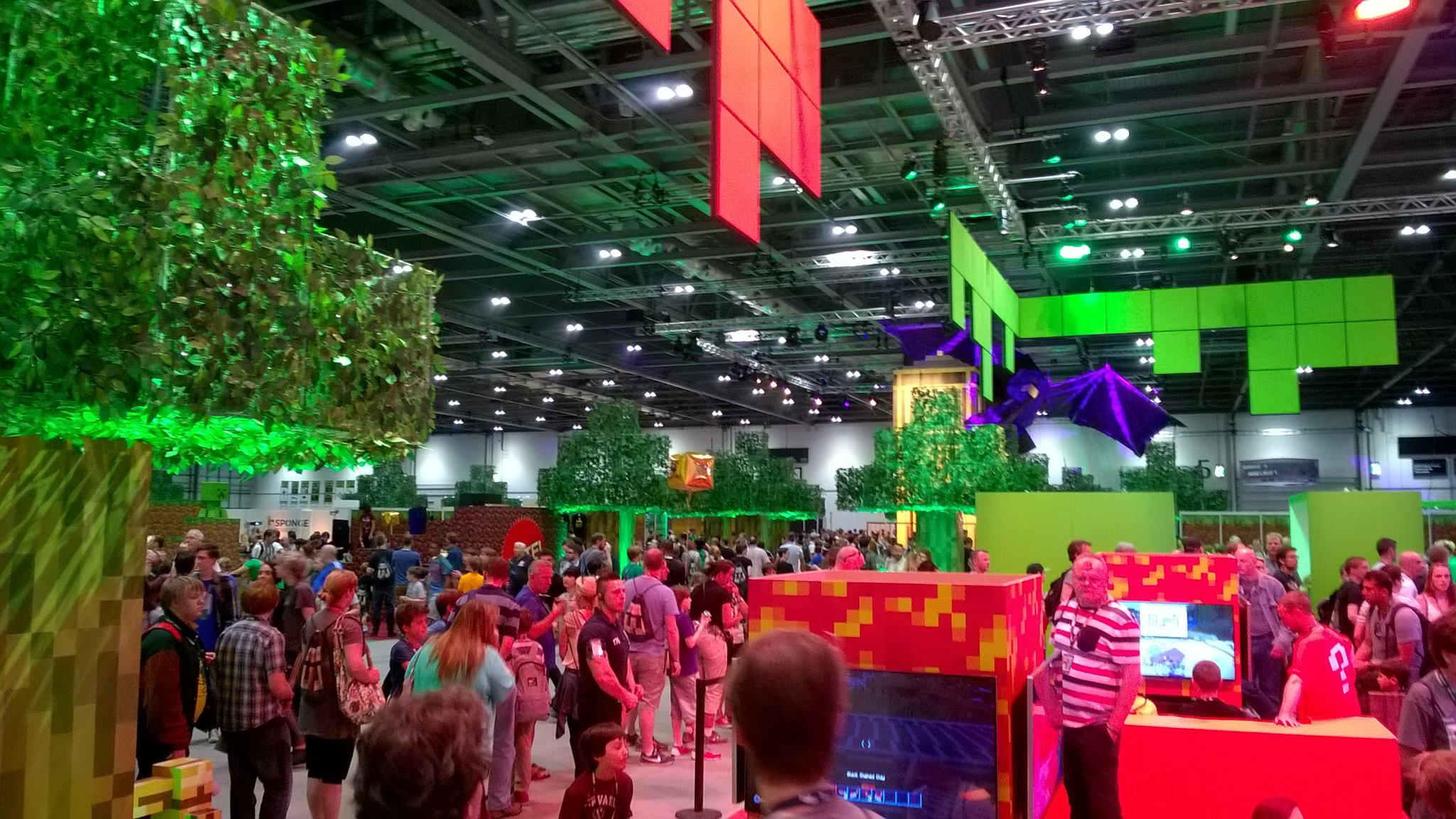
The Expo Hall at MineCon 2015

External videos
- MineCon 2015 Opening Ceremony Animation

On 2 February 2015, Vu Bui announced MINECON 2015 would be held in London, at the ExCeL London Exhibition and Conference Centre on the 4 and 5 July 2015. Ticket prices were announced on 18 March 2015 and were set at £129. During the opening ceremony on 4 July 2015, animated by Element Animation Studios, it was announced by Guinness World Records that MineCon had won the world record for the most attendance for a convention that is solely for one game, selling 10,000 tickets.

=== 2016 ===
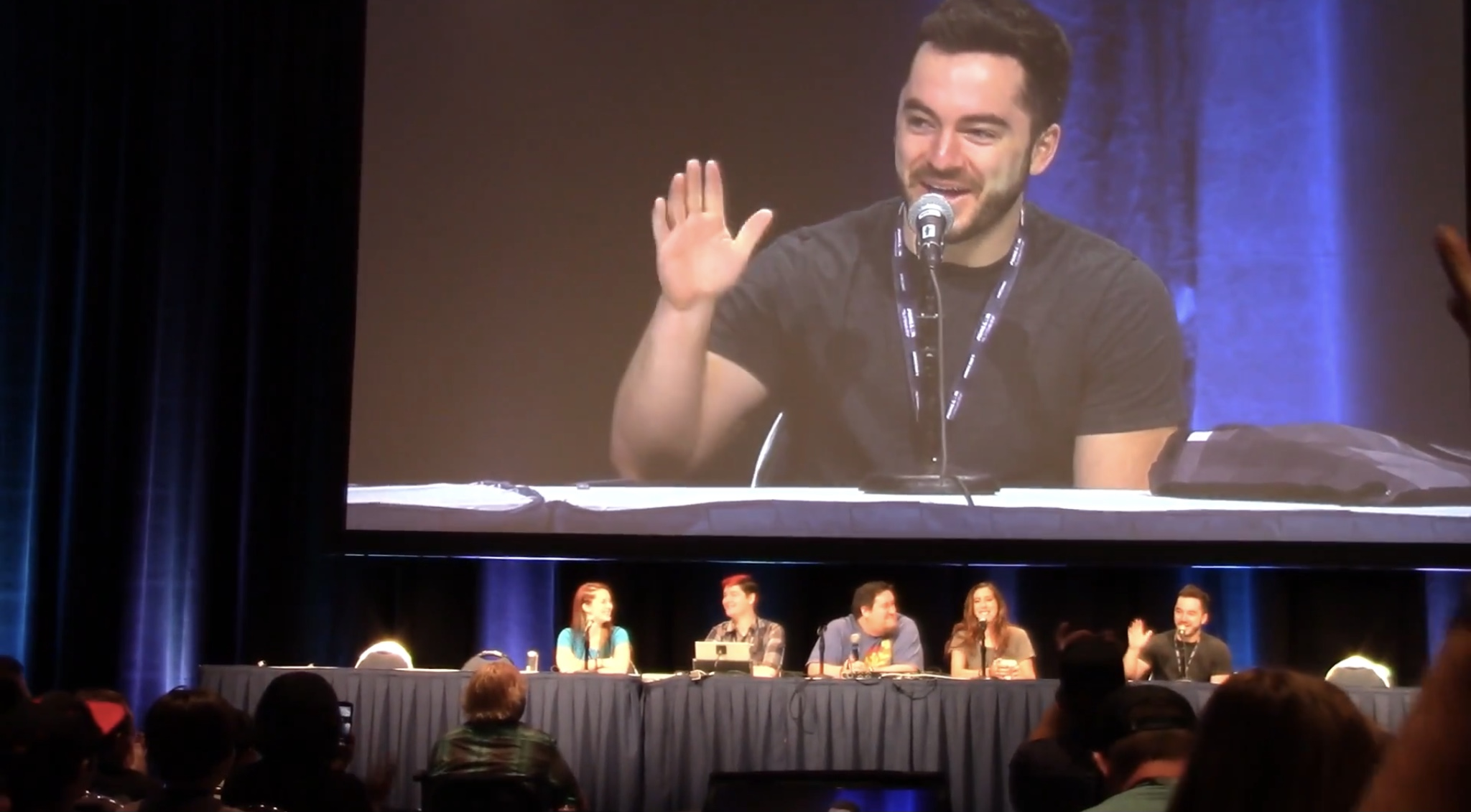
Popular Minecraft content creators participate and interact with fans and other creators at Minecon. Pictured: Jordan Maron (CaptainSparklez) on a panel in 2016.

On 7 March 2016, Mojang announced in a blog post that MINECON 2016 would be held in Anaheim, California, at the Anaheim Convention Center on the 24 and 25 September 2016. They announced new features during that time, such as the Minecraft novel, Minecraft: The Island, and an update coming to the console versions of the game. Promoted in the opening and closing ceremonies was a two-part short film from Element Animation, entitled A Minecraft Adventure.

=== 2020–2022 Minecraft Festival (cancelled) ===
Following three years of livestreams, a return to the in-person convention format was announced at Minecon Live 2019, named Minecraft Festival, which would happen in September 2020. Minecraft Festival's venue, the Orange County Convention Center in Orlando, Florida, would have been the same venue for Minecon 2013. More details were revealed at the very start of the COVID-19 pandemic, but was swiftly postponed a week later to the same dates the next year, then to an undetermined date in 2022, and then cancelled for 2022 as the pandemic continued.

=== 2026 ===
For the first time in 10 years and 7 years, Minecraft came back to conventions and came back with a live audience. On 30-31 May 2026 Minecraft held an event called Minecraft at TwitchCon. TwitchCon is an in-person event for fans of Twitch streamers. The event included several sessions and activities for fans of Minecraft. Many of the events were run by popular Minecraft streamers. Fans who attended these events could get special in-game capes. This event ran alongside the Minecraft Live event on 30 May 2026.

== Online events ==
Timeline of Minecraft livestreams
| Year | Event | Dates | Venue |
|---|---|---|---|
| 2017 | MINECON Earth | 18 November | Centre Stage, Atlanta, Georgia |
| 2018 | MINECON Earth | 29 September | Copper Box Arena, London, England |
| 2019 | MINECON Live | 28 September | Nashville Municipal Auditorium, Nashville, Tennessee |
| 2020 | Minecraft Live | 3 October | Annexet, Stockholm, Sweden |
| 2021 | Minecraft Live | 16 October | Annexet, Stockholm, Sweden |
| 2022 | Minecraft Live | 15 October | Annexet, Stockholm, Sweden |
| 2023 | Minecraft Live | 15 October | Mighty Media Studios, Bellevue, Washington |
| 2024 | Minecraft Live | 28 September | Mojang Offices, Stockholm, Sweden |
| 2025 | Minecraft Live | 22 March | Mojang Offices, Stockholm, Sweden |
| 2025 | Minecraft Live | 27 September | Mojang Offices, Stockholm, Sweden |
| 2026 | Minecraft Live | 21 March | Mojang Offices, Stockholm, Sweden |
| 2026 | Minecraft Live | 30 May | Rotterdam Ahoy, Rotterdam, Netherlands |
| 2026 | Minecraft Live | 26 September | Mojang Offices, Stockholm, Sweden |

=== 2017 ===
On 8 August 2017, Mojang announced that MINECON would be taking the form of an interactive livestream on 18 November 2017, dubbed "MINECON Earth". The host of MINECON Earth is Will Arnett, a Canadian actor. After this announcement came the introduction of 'Official Community Events', which allow events such as Minefaire, Minevention and Multiplay's BlockFest to be considered 'Official Minecraft Conventions'. During the show, the developers announced the next major update, the "Update Aquatic", released in July 2018. A new feature of MINECON was the "Mob Vote", a community poll where users are invited to vote on Twitter (X) for one of few mobs to be implemented into the game. Hosted by Vu Bui, COO of Mojang Studios, it was announced at the end of the livestream that the winning mob was "The Monster of The Night Skies", later named the "Phantom".

=== 2018 ===
On 10 April 2018, Mojang announced that MINECON Earth would be taking place on 29 September 2018 for 90 minutes on stream. During the event, Mojang announced Minecraft Dungeons, a dungeon-crawler spin-off of Minecraft, and features of the upcoming "Village & Pillage" update, which was released in April 2019. Viewers voted for one of three in-game biomes to be updated in the next update in a "Biome Vote"; the Taiga biome won the vote. Prior to the event, players in China participated in a promotional poll by Netease in which they guessed which national Chinese animal would join Minecraft. The options were the giant panda, Chinese alligator, golden snub-nosed monkey, Thorold's deer, and baiji. The former was announced to be implemented in the "Village & Pillage" update, and it coincidentally placed first in this poll and was added as well.

=== 2019 ===
On 17 May 2019, MINECON Live 2019 was announced to be held on 28 September that same year, changing the name of the event from "MINECON Earth" to "MINECON Live" to avoid confusion with their new game Minecraft Earth. Like the previous year, viewers were able to vote for new features to be added to one of three in-game biomes in a following update; the Mountains biome won the vote. During the livestream, developers of the game announced the "Nether Update", released in June 2020. An early access release date of Minecraft Earth was also announced to be for October 2019.

=== 2020 ===
The first to use the "Minecraft Live" branding, Minecraft Live 2020 was held on 3 October 2020 virtually with no live audience due to the COVID-19 pandemic. It marked the return of the Mob Vote since Minecon Earth 2017, where users could vote about which Minecraft creature should be added into the next update. The three options were Iceologer (featured in Minecraft Dungeons), Moobloom (featured in the now cancelled mobile game Minecraft Earth) and Glow Squid, with the latter winning. The livestream also provided details on Minecraft's next big update, "Caves & Cliffs", and a musical "Nether Update Encore" from Element Animation featuring additions from the previous update.

=== 2021 ===
Minecraft Live 2021 was held on 16 October 2021. It featured a live Mob Vote, like previous years, with the options consisting of the Copper Golem, the Glare, and the Allay, the last of which won the vote. It also featured another Element Animation musical short film, a recap of the features of the previous "Caves & Cliffs: Part 1". The show also announced the theme of the next major update, called "The Wild Update", which added a new biome, the mangrove forest, and an underground biome called the Deep Dark, which was originally planned for the "Caves & Cliffs".

=== 2022 ===
Minecraft Live 2022 was held on 15 October 2022. It featured a Mob Vote, this time in-game, with the options consisting of the Sniffer, the Rascal, and the Tuff Golem, the first of which won the vote. Unlike previous years, the developers revealed a few basic features for the next update, including camels, bamboo wood, and hanging signs. The update was later dubbed the "Trails & Tales" update. It also announced the basic gameplay for the upcoming game Minecraft Legends and the Season 3 update for Minecraft Dungeons.

=== 2023 ===
Minecraft Live 2023 was held on 15 October 2023, which featured another Mob vote, featuring the crab, armadillo, and penguin, the second of which won the vote. The event also announced portions of the next major updates of Minecraft, Minecraft Legends and Minecraft Education. Like previous years, there was an announcement relating to the next major update. This year, the update that was announced was Tricky Trials. The update had been introduced to focus on an underground structure focused on combat, as well as a new block that enabled automatic crafting called the "Crafter". Yet another short film from Element Animation was shown during the livestream, staring mobs from the last update.

=== 2024 ===
Minecraft Live 2024 was held on 28 September 2024. Starting with this year, the mob vote was retired. However, a new mob and biome were discussed, the "Creaking" and "Pale Gardens" biomes, respectively. After, the show went on to discuss and show a new trailer of A Minecraft Movie, and announced new features for Minecraft: Bedrock Edition. The show discussed The Minecraft Experience: Villager Rescue, a real-life Minecraft-themed interactive experience, and featured another short from Element Animation, promoting the upcoming drop.

=== 2025 ===
==== March ====
Minecraft Live 2025: March 2025 was held on 22 March 2025. The first of two Minecraft Live events in 2025, it discussed the upcoming Spring Drop which was later released on March 25 as Spring to Life, which included new variants of existing mobs. It also showed some features coming in a later drop nicknamed the "Summer Drop", such as Vibrant Visuals, a built in form of shaders, and new forms of the ghast, the dried ghast, ghastling, and happy ghast. It also showed a preview of the upcoming A Minecraft Movie.

==== September ====
Minecraft Live 2025: September 2025 was held on 27 September 2025. The second of two Minecraft Live events in 2025, it discussed the Copper Age and Mounts of Mayhem updates.

=== 2026 ===
==== March ====
Minecraft Live 2026: March 2026 was broadcast on 21 March 2026. During the event, the release date of the Tiny Takeover update was revealed, along with the announcements of the Chaos Cubed update and Minecraft Dungeons II. The event also introduced the Parties multiplayer feature and revealed concept art for the Minecraft World theme park.

==== May ====
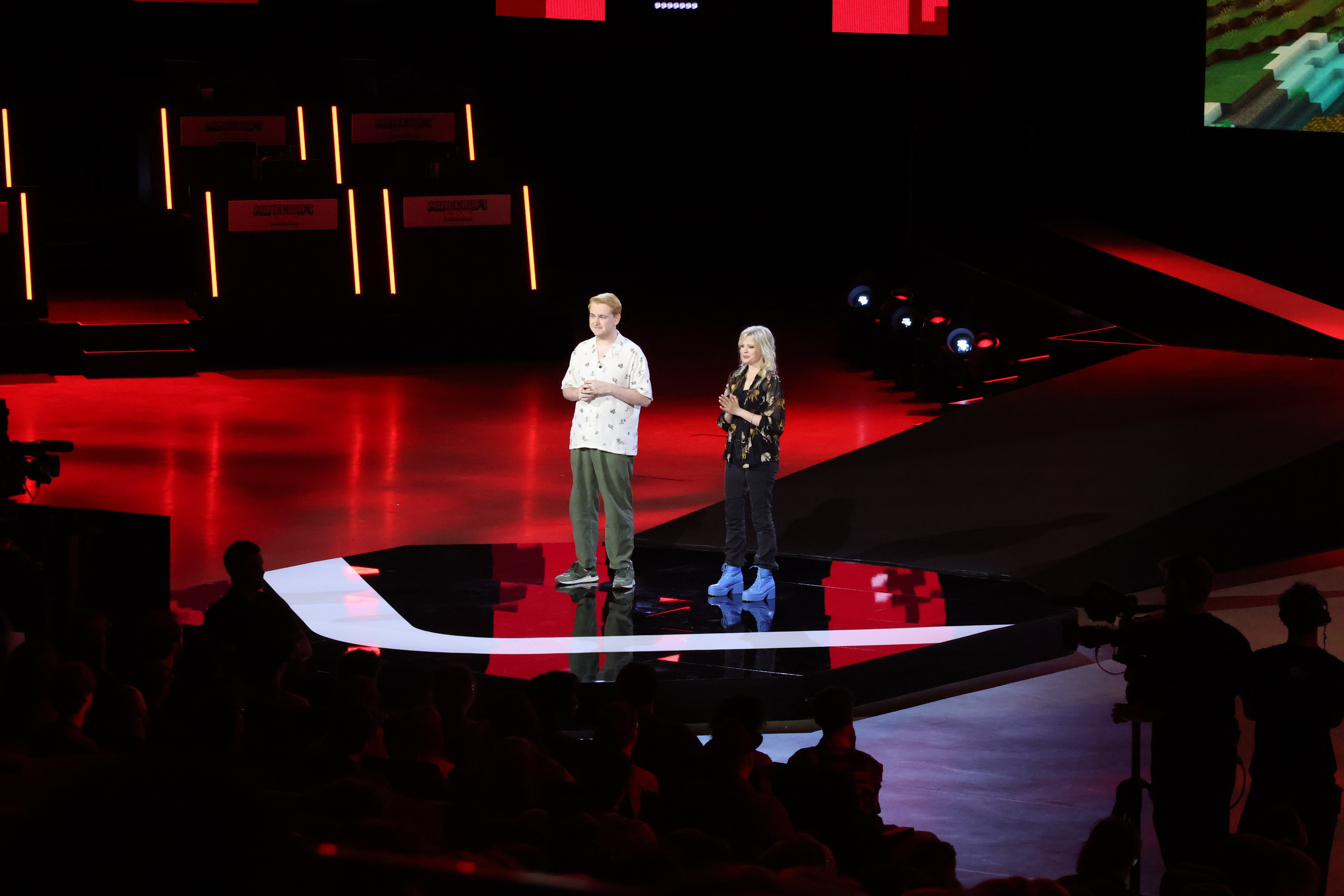
Minecraft Live 2026 at Rotterdam Ahoy during TwitchCon Europe with hosts Scott "Smajor" Major and Agnes Larsson

Minecraft Live: TwitchCon May 2026 was broadcast on 30 May 2026. The event was held at TwitchCon Rotterdam. The event revealed the Chaos Cubed drop's release date, showed concept art of Minecraft Dungeons II, shared information about A Minecraft Movie Squared and showcased the upcoming unnamed game drop featuring a new autumn Dappled Forest biome.

A speedrunning tournament called the Midoffs Live by Tubbo also commenced.

==== September ====
Minecraft Live: September 2026 was broadcast on 26 September 2026. The event revealed the Sift, which is a new dimension planned for Java and Bedrock Edition in 2027 (though first added in Minecraft Dungeons II), the new Ice Caves biome, an update of the Minecraft World theme park's progress, and more information about Minecraft Dungeons II's storyline and world.
