= Gameknight999 =

Children's fantasy fiction series

- Cover of Invasion of the Overworld, the first entry in the series
- Invasion of the Overworld; Battle for the Nether; Confronting the Dragon
- Author: Mark Cheverton
- Country: United States
- Language: English
- Genre: Fan fiction; children's literature; fantasy
- Publisher: Skyhorse Publishing
- Published: August 26, 2013
- No. of books: 3
- OCLC: 1293230980
- Followed by: Mystery of Herobrine (trilogy)
- Website: www.simonandschuster.com/series/Gameknight999-Series; markcheverton.com

Gameknight999 is a series of children's novels written by Mark Cheverton and published from 2013 to 2017. The series is unofficially based on Minecraft and set within its world. The second novel of the series was listed in the Publishers Weekly bestseller list in November 2014 and the New York Times children's series bestseller list in February 2015.

== Plot ==
The series describes adventures of the protagonist with the user name "Gameknight999", who is initially a griefer and finds himself teleported by one of his father's inventions (digitizer) into the world of the Minecraft video game. Gameknight discovers that the creatures in the game are alive and it isn't a game to them. Gameknight experiences real-life adventures and actual danger with life-or-death consequences while stuck in the Minecraft digital universe.

Most of the novels feature Herobrine as the main antagonist, who is an urban legend and creepypasta that originated as a hoax propagated by an anonymous post on the English-language imageboard website 4chan. Within the series, he is presented as a sentient computer virus intending on escaping the confines of Minecraft alongside an army of monsters from the game, with the intent to wipe out humanity.

== Background ==
Mark Cheverton is an author and engineer based in upstate New York. Cheverton says he originally wrote the first book of the Gameknight999 series, Invasion of the Overworld, to teach his son about cyberbullying.

== Publication history ==
Along with Cheverton's other books, the GameKnight999 series is published by Skyhorse Publishing under the Sky Pony Press imprint, and distributed by Simon & Schuster. The publisher distributes all of Cheverton's novels as well as four box sets.

From 2014 to 2017, a total of six trilogies featuring Gameknight999 were published.

- Minecraft series #1 – Gameknight999
  - Invasion of the Overworld
  - Battle for the Nether (Publishers Weekly bestseller)
  - Confronting the Dragon
- Minecraft Series #2 – Mystery of Herobrine
  - Trouble in Zombie-Town
  - The Jungle Temple Oracle
  - Last Stand on the Ocean Shore
- Minecraft Series #3 – Herobrine Reborn
  - Saving Crafter
  - Destruction of the Overworld
  - Gameknight999 vs Herobrine
- Minecraft Series #4 – Herobrine’s Revenge
  - Phantom Virus
  - Overworld in Flames
  - System Overload
- Minecraft Series #5 – Birth of Herobrine
  - The Great Zombie Invasion
  - Attack of the Shadow-Crafters
  - Herobrine's War
- Minecraft Series #6 – Mystery of Entity303
  - Terrors of the Forest
  - Monsters in the Mist
  - Mission to the Moon

== Reception ==
This Gameknight999 series (in particular the second novel Battle for the Nether) was listed in the Publishers Weekly bestseller list in November 2014. Battle for the Nether was listed for one week in the New York Times children's series bestseller list in February 2015. According to Cheverton's website, the series has been published in 32 countries and translated into 22 languages.

In reviewing the first novel, online magazine Brutal Gamer wrote that "the story stays pretty true to the Minecraft experience. ... Whether you're trying to pry your Minecraft addict away from the screen for a little while, or just looking for an interesting new choice for summer reading time, Invasion of the Overworld is sure to be a hit with the 8–11-year-old set."
