= Minecraft: The Manga =

2020 manga by Kazuyoshi Seto

- First tankōbon volume cover

MINECRAFT(マインクラフト)〜世界の果てへの旅〜 (Mainkurafuto: Sekai no Hate e no Tabi)
- Genre: Fantasy, adventure
- Created by: Mojang Studios
- Manga
- Written by: Kazuyoshi Seto
- Published by: Shogakukan
- English publisher: NA: Viz Media
- Magazine: CoroCoro Comic
- Original run: April 15, 2020 – present
- Volumes: 13
- icon

Minecraft: The Manga (Note: Japanese: MINECRAFT(マインクラフト)〜世界の果てへの旅〜, Hepburn: Mainkurafuto - Sekai no Hate e no Tabi; lit. 'Minecraft: Journey to the World's End') is a Japanese manga series written and illustrated by Kazuyoshi Seto. It began serialization in Shogakukan's CoroCoro Comic magazine in April 2020. The series is based on the 2011 sandbox game Minecraft.

== Plot ==
The series follows Nico White, the son of a great adventurer as he goes to find the End of the World.

== Characters ==
Nico White
The main protagonist. Energetic and curious, he follows in his fathers footsteps by becoming an adventurer. He has a special crest on his hand that contains a "Mod Power", allowing him to craft anything without a crafting table, so long as he has enough materials.
Gray
A man who is cursed to be a zombie. He travels the world to find a cure for his curse. Unlike real Zombies, he doesn't burn in the sunlight.
Yamabuki
A ninja who was kicked out of his village because he has no talent for hiding, but is a skilled fighter. He fights with two obsidian swords made by Nico's father.

== Publication ==
Written and illustrated by Kazuyoshi Seto, Minecraft: The Manga is based on the video game of the same name developed by Mojang Studios. It began serialization in Shogakukan's children's manga magazine CoroCoro Comic on April 15, 2020. The first tankōbon volume was released on September 28, 2020. As of March 2026, the series has released 13 volumes.

Following the release of the eighth volume of the series and to commemorate its 500,000 sale, the first edition of the eight volume includes a download code for "Sniffer's Slipper" which can be used in the game.

In June 2024, Viz Media announced that they licensed the series for English publication following Minecraft's 15th anniversary. The first volume was published on March 11, 2025.

=== Volumes ===
No.	Original release date	Original ISBN	English release date	English ISBN
1	September 28, 2020	978-4-09-143235-3	March 11, 2025	978-1-9747-4714-6
2	March 26, 2021	978-4-09-143283-4	June 10, 2025	978-1-9747-4715-3
3	August 27, 2021	978-4-09-143324-4	September 9, 2025	978-1-9747-5810-4
4	January 27, 2022	978-4-09-143373-2	December 9, 2025	978-1-9747-5811-1
5	June 28, 2022	978-4-09-143521-7	March 10, 2026	978-1-9747-6233-0
6	December 27, 2022	978-4-09-143568-2	June 9, 2026	978-1-9747-6310-8
7	April 28, 2023	978-4-09-143596-5	September 8, 2026	978-1-9747-6311-5
8	October 27, 2023	978-4-09-143651-1	December 8, 2026	978-1-9747-6312-2
9	May 28, 2024	978-4-09-143720-4	—	—
10	October 28, 2024	978-4-09-149795-6	—	—
11	March 28, 2025	978-4-09-154013-3	—	—
12	August 28, 2025	978-4-09-154064-5	—	—
13	March 27, 2026	978-4-09-154151-2	—	—

== Reception ==
The series had over 500,000 copies in circulation by October 2023.

Kara Dennison of Otaku USA reviewed the first volume of the manga, stating that despite the manga being aimed at kids, it will be appreciated by all ages. She also praised the art style of the manga, although she does not consider it to be "high art," adding that the manga's protagonist Nico is a "fun character." Jenni Lada called the series "like any typical shonen manga geared toward kids" and commented on the character design by Seto. Lauren Orsini of Anime News Network gave the manga a three and a half stars out of five stating Nico is more a "textbook shonen manga hero" adding that the manga is more appealing to younger audience.
