= Trayaurus and the Enchanted Crystal =

2016 graphic novel by YouTuber DanTDM

- The book's front cover
- Author: Daniel Middleton
- Illustrators: Doreen Mulryan; Mike Love; David Forrest; Kinetic Underground
- Cover artist: Doreen Mulryan
- Language: British English
- Genre: Adventure fiction; Science fiction
- Publisher: Trapeze; HarperCollins
- Publication date: 6 October 2016 (UK); 25 October 2016 (US)
- Media type: Graphic novel
- Pages: 193
- ISBN: 9781409168393
- OCLC: 950638376
- Dewey Decimal: 741.5942
- Text: Trayaurus and the Enchanted Crystal at Google Books

Trayaurus and the Enchanted Crystal is the debut graphic novel by YouTuber Daniel Middleton (alias DanTDM). It is set in the sandbox video game Minecraft, and features characters that have appeared in Middleton's YouTube videos for all ages. Commercially, the book was a success, spending three weeks at the top of the list of bestselling books in the world as well as reaching the number one spot on The New York Times Best Seller list for hardcover graphic books in the US.

== Background ==
Middleton had been considering writing a book for a number of years. In an interview with The Guardian, Middleton admitted he is not an avid reader by any standard, but in the end did decide to author a novel that would be "the kind of book that I would read". He considered the opportunity to write a book about the stock characters that he employs in his YouTube videos an "important" way to give them their own style.

Rights to publish the book were auctioned by Middleton's management agency OP Talent Limited, and bought by HarperCollins in the US and Trapeze (Orion) in the UK. The news that Middleton was writing a book was made public in May 2016.

In October 2016, Middleton promoted his book at the Cheltenham Literature Festival where he was the first author of 2016 to sell out his tickets to the event.

== Plot ==
Trayaurus and the Enchanted Crystal is a story about DanTDM and his scientist friend Trayaurus, who, one day, discovers a crystal that has crashed on The Overworld while shattering into five pieces. It does not take long until they discover its powerful potential. DanTDM and Trayaurus set out to find the other crystals, but are hindered in their objective by their nemesis Denton who appears in many of Daniel's old Minecraft videos. Denton is trying to gain all of that power for himself. The lead characters feel like they have no choice but to stop Denton by finding all the remaining pieces first, preventing Denton from becoming more dangerous than he already is at present.

== Sales ==
Commercially, the book was well received in both the United Kingdom and the United States. In the UK, Trayaurus and the Enchanted Crystal was able to reach the first spot on the bestsellers list for three weeks. In the US, the book was able to reach the twenty-third spot on the USA Today's Best-Selling Books list while also reaching the first spot on The New York Times Best Seller list for hardcover graphic books and remaining there for eleven consecutive weeks.

== Critical reception ==
Common Sense Media rated Trayaurus and the Enchanted Crystal three out of five stars saying that although the novel tells an "amusing tale" and spins a "classic good-vs.-evil" story, the action within the book is "sometimes hard to follow" and occasionally moves the plot along too slowly. GeekDad gave a generally favourable review as well, hailing its "straightforward, easy-to-follow story" but criticizing the art style: "Lines are often roughly sketched and colors lack finesse". Night Owl Reviews was enthusiastic about the book and gave it four out of five stars. The website praised both the "outstanding" art style and "delightful" story, but did take issue with the fact that all characters are male: "I realize that most comics are read by boys but it would have been nice to see a female or two".
