= Minecraft Dungeons II =

2026 video game

- Developers: Mojang Studios; Double Eleven
- Publisher: Xbox Game Studios
- Series: Minecraft
- Engine: Unreal Engine 5
- Platforms: Nintendo Switch; Nintendo Switch 2; PlayStation 5; Xbox Series X/S; Windows
- Release: September 29, 2026
- Genre: Dungeon crawler
- Modes: Single-player, multiplayer

Minecraft Dungeons II is a 2026 dungeon crawler video game developed by Mojang Studios and Double Eleven and published by Xbox Game Studios. The sequel to Minecraft Dungeons (2020) and part of the Minecraft franchise, it was released on Windows, Xbox Series X/S, PlayStation 5, Nintendo Switch, and Nintendo Switch 2 on September 29, 2026. It received positive reviews from critics.

== Gameplay ==
Similar to its predecessor, Minecraft Dungeons II is a hack and slash–styled dungeon crawler. Up to four players can explore dungeons containing dangerous mobs to obtain loot and progress through the story. It is an open world game, unlike the previous game—players can travel freely between areas, and minecart stations have been added as a form of fast travel between said areas. Loot comes in the form of collectable armor, tools, and weapons. Major new features include a jump ability, armor being split into four individual pieces, talismans that provide passive effects, and an improved inventory menu.

The game features a brand-new dimension known as the Sift. Players can travel between the Overworld and the Sift via open rifts that appear in various places, and by activating the portal frame in the Deep Dark. Mobs can be corrupted by the sheer power of the souls from the Sift and become more powerful.

== Plot ==
Minecraft Dungeons II is set in the same world as its predecessor, known as the Overworld. It is made up of 3D cubes referred to as "blocks" and is inhabited by both peaceful and hostile mobs.

After the events of Minecraft Dungeons, the heroes and villagers assume a time of peace until a group of illagers discover an underground portal leading to the Sift, a dimension brimming with the boundless power of souls. The illagers harness the power to become three almighty beings—the Prime Enchanter, the Grand Illusioner, and the Supreme Evoker—and form the Illager High Council. With their newly formed army of illagers and soul–corrupted mobs, they begin tearing rifts in the fabric between dimensions, invading the Sift and destroying the villagers' home of Squid Coast.

After travelling from their destroyed home, the heroes establish Brave Haven, a new home and central hub. Players assume the role of the heroes who set out to defeat the Illager High Council before they become too powerful and cause the collapse of both dimensions.

== Progression ==
Five separate Overworld regions exist, including Brave Haven, Honeycomb Fields, Howling Woods, Rainy Plains, and Frozen Highlands. When the Sift is unlocked, players can also explore Singer's Meadow, Humbler Huskland, and Lullaby Hills. Each region has loot, core quests and dungeons. Many bosses exist, like the Twisted Warden and two members of the Illager High Council. As you play, your hero level raises, letting you get heigher level loot. Interactive NPCs such as the Mechant, Enchantsmith, and Blacksmith can help you increase your weapon power.

== Release ==
The game was developed by Mojang Studios in collaboration with Double Eleven which previously co-developed Minecraft Dungeons. The project was leaked as early as 2024 from a roadmap including the original minecraft movie and a second one hinted, turning out to be confirmed in mid 2026. This, and the speculations behind the game no longer getting updates, alongside the minecraft dungeons twitter page remaining- posting "is anyone still here"- open. referred to as Project Spicewood, and was later announced as Minecraft Dungeons II during the March 2026 Minecraft Live event. During the June 2026 Xbox Games Showcase, the game's release date of September 29, 2026, was announced. It was released for Windows, Xbox Series X/S, PlayStation 5, Nintendo Switch, and Nintendo Switch 2.

== Reception ==
Reception

Aggregate scores
Aggregator	Score
Metacritic	(PC) 72/100 (XSX) 75/100
OpenCritic	72% recommend

Review scores
Publication	Score
Destructoid	9/10
Game Informer	7.25/10
GameSpot	7/10
GamesRadar+	3.5/5
IGN	6/10

Minecraft Dungeons II received "generally favorable" reviews from critics, according to review aggregator website Metacritic. Fellow review aggregator OpenCritic assessed that the game received strong approval, being recommended by 72% of critics.

Reviewers saw it as a small improvement of its predecessor rather than a reinvention, crediting improved gameplay but also saying that it can quickly become repetitive. CGMagazine singled out the shift from the original's standalone mission levels to an interconnected overworld as the biggest improvement. Justin Towell of GamesRadar+ described it as what the first game should have been, praising its balance and gear enchantment system. IGN's Travis Northup described it as "shallow" and suggested that it made "poor use of Minecraft's iconic world."
