= DanTDM =

English YouTuber (born 1991)

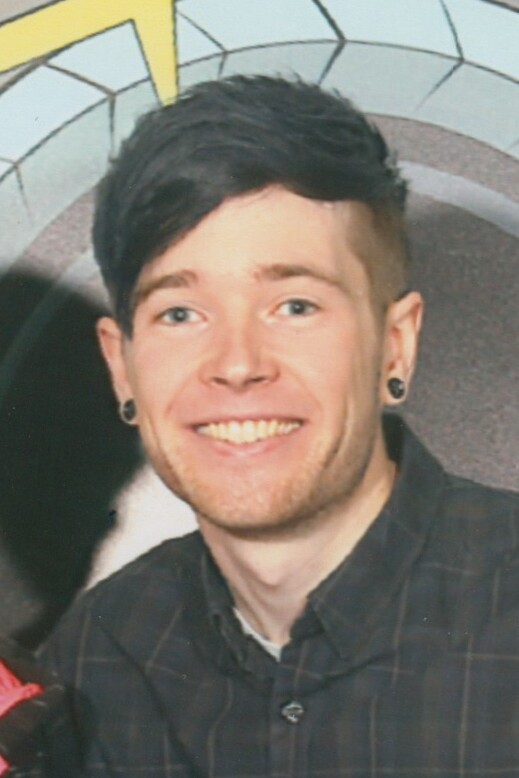
- Middleton in 2016
- Born: Daniel Robert Middleton; 8 November 1991 (age 34); Aldershot, Hampshire, England
- Other name: TheDiamondMinecart
- Education: University of Northampton (BA)
- Occupations: YouTuber; gamer
- Spouse: Jemma Middleton (m. 2013)
- Children: 2

YouTube information
- Channel: DanTDM
- Years active: 2012–present
- Genre: Gaming
- Subscribers: 29.1 million (main channel); 35.5 million (combined) (Note: Subscribers, broken down by channel: 29.1 million (DanTDM); 1.78 million (DanTDM Live); 860 thousand (DanTDM Shorts); 572 thousand (Dan & Tray); 3.12 million (MoreTDM); 118 thousand (PokemanDanLv45))
- Views: 20.4 billion (main channel); 21.3 billion (combined) (Note: Views, broken down by channel: 20.4 billion (DanTDM); 294 million (DanTDM Live); 97.4 million (DanTDM Shorts); 3.869 million (Dan & Tray); 587 million (MoreTDM); 3.848 million (PokemanDanLv45))
- Last updated: 04 November 2026
- Website: dantdmshop.com

Daniel Robert Middleton (born 8 November 1991), better known as DanTDM (formerly TheDiamondMinecart), is an English YouTuber, video game commentator and author. He is primarily known for his Let's Play gaming videos, but has also ventured into vlogging. Middleton's YouTube channel, which he started in 2012, has amassed over 29 million subscribers and 20 billion views as of 2025, making him one of the most popular content creators on the platform.

Middleton began his YouTube career with Minecraft content, later expanding to other games and vlog-style videos. He has published a graphic novel, voiced a character in the UK version of the film Ralph Breaks the Internet (2018), and embarked on several world tours featuring live shows. In 2016, he was listed in the Guinness World Records Gamer's Edition for "Most views for a dedicated Minecraft video channel".

Beyond his online presence, Middleton has been involved in various charitable initiatives and has won several awards, including multiple Nickelodeon Kids' Choice Awards in the UK Favourite Gamer category. In 2017, Middleton topped the Forbes list of Highest-Paid YouTube Stars, earning £12.2 million (about $16.5 million) in one year.

== Early life ==
Daniel Robert Middleton was born on 8 November 1991 in Aldershot, England, as the elder of two siblings. His parents divorced when he was a child. He attended the University of Northampton where he studied music production. Before his career as a YouTuber and author, he worked at Tesco, telling the BBC in 2017: "When I earned enough money off YouTube to match it [my wage at Tesco] my wife persuaded me to do it".

== Career ==
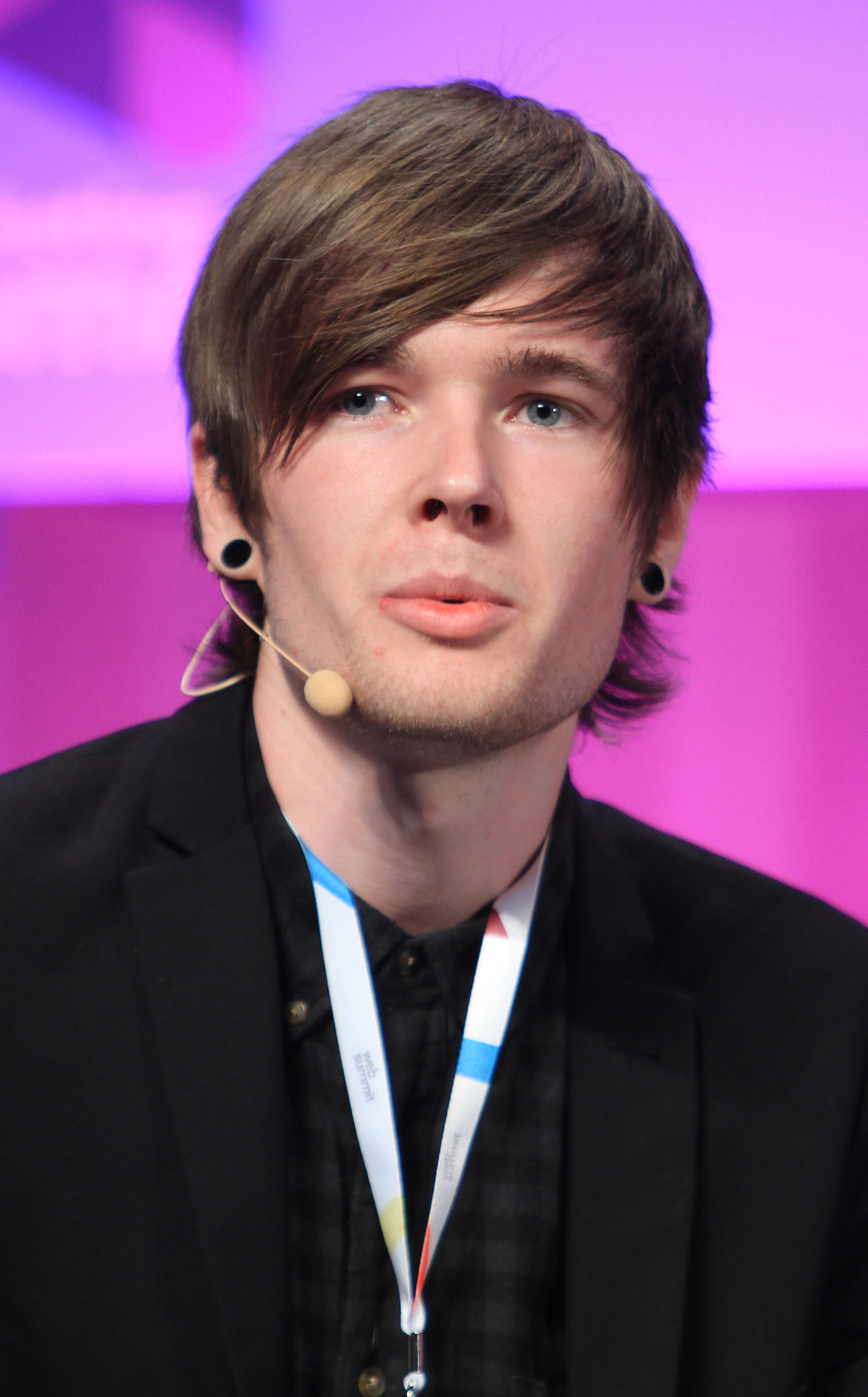
Middleton at Web Summit in 2014

In 2012, Middleton first created TheDiamondMinecart, a gaming channel. In August 2014, Middleton signed with the multi-channel network Maker Studios under its Polaris label. He decided to change his channel's name to TheDiamondMinecart // DanTDM later on, and on 12 December 2016, to DanTDM. He currently produces videos out of his home studio in Wellingborough. Middleton's content is largely targeted at children, though many teens and adults watch it as well.

As his original fanbase that propelled his career has grown up, Middleton has scaled back his video production schedule and focused more on creating graphic novels, hosting live shows, and DanTDM merchandise. He released a graphic novel titled Trayaurus and the Enchanted Crystal on 6 October 2016, which remained at the number one spot on The New York Times Best Seller list for hardcover graphic books for eleven weeks. He was a featured guest at the Cheltenham Literature Festival and went on a book tour that included parts of the UK and a visit to New York City. He then embarked on a tour through the United States and Australia in 2017. His live show at the Sydney Opera House was the second fastest to sell out in the venue's history. While acknowledging that he might not be a household name "yet", he was noted by the Tampa Bay Times as being "one of YouTube's brightest stars and biggest successes".

In 2017, he starred in a web series called DanTDM Creates a Big Scene starring himself and featuring other social media entertainers and actors. The series premiered on 7 April 2017 exclusively for YouTube Red, YouTube's subscription service (now called YouTube Premium). The show "follows DanTDM and his group of animated friends as they battle to keep their live show on the road". That year, Today praised his "infectious laugh and an unmistakable British accent" and his personal growth from a "shy, low-profile YouTuber to the master of a creative empire".

In 2019, Middleton was ranked 41st in the UK's Top 100 Influencer List by The Sunday Times, which also estimated Middleton's net worth to be £25 million.

In January 2025, Middleton joined Classic FM as a regular presenter. Currently, he hosts the video game music-focused series Next Level, Music featured includes the soundtracks to Minecraft, The Legend of Zelda, Final Fantasy, and The Elder Scrolls.

== Personal life ==
Middleton married his girlfriend, Jemma, in March 2013. They have two sons. He has openly discussed his struggles with mental health after experiencing severe depression, caused by the isolation of the COVID-19 lockdowns.

== Filmography ==
=== Film ===
Year	Title	Role	Notes	Ref.
2018	Ralph Breaks the Internet	eBoy	Voice role; UK theatrical version	
2019	DanTDM Presents: The Contest	Himself	Interactive cinema event	
2021	Free Guy	Himself	Cameo	
2025	A Minecraft Movie	Auction attendee	Cameo	

=== Television ===
Year	Title	Role	Notes	Ref.
2016–2017	Skylanders Academy	Cy	Voice role; 2 episodes	
2017	DanTDM Creates a Big Scene	Himself	YouTube Original mini-series; 6 episodes	
2017	YouTube Rewind	Himself	Only in 2017	
2025	Black Mirror	Himself	Cameo; Episode: "USS Callister: Into Infinity"	
2026	LEGO City: No Limits	Himself	Season 4 episodes	

=== Video games ===
Year	Title	Role	Notes	Ref.
2016	Minecraft: Story Mode	Himself	Episode 6: "A Portal to Mystery"	

== Awards and nominations ==
- Guinness World Record for "Most goals scored in a game of Rocket League for a team of 2" (shared with Tom "Syndicate" Cassell) and "Most goals scored in a game of Rocket League (team of three)".
- Guinness World Record for "Most views for a dedicated Minecraft video channel".
- Nickelodeon Kids' Choice Awards in the category UK Favourite Tipster: 2015 and 2016.
- Nickelodeon Kids' Choice Awards in the category UK Favourite Gamer: 2020.

== Publications ==
- DanTDM (6 October 2016). Trayaurus and the Enchanted Crystal. HarperCollins. ISBN 978-1409168393.
- DanTDM (17 November 2016). Official DanTDM 2017 Diary and Activity Book: Lots of Things to Make and Do. Trapeze. ISBN 978-1409171188.
