= Minecraft World =

2027 theme park at Chessington World of Adventures

- Location: Chessington World of Adventures
- Status: Planned
- Opens: 2027; 1 year's time
- Operated by: Xbox Places
- Theme: Minecraft

Minecraft World is an upcoming attraction at Chessington World of Adventures, a theme park in Chessington, Greater London, England. The attraction is themed around the sandbox video game Minecraft, and is scheduled to open in 2027 at an estimated cost of £50 million. It is being developed by Minecraft's creator Mojang Studios and Merlin Entertainments. Minecraft World is planned to have a rollercoaster, interactive exhibitions, play areas, eating places and shops. It is the first Minecraft-themed theme park.

== Development ==
Mojang and Merlin first began planning the attraction in about 2018, and in 2024 the two companies signed an £85 million deal to develop Minecraft attractions in the United Kingdom and the United States. The UK park is replacing the Wild Asia area at Chessington and is being developed with the help of a few Minecraft content creators. Plans for the area and the location of it were announced to the public in the March 2026 Minecraft Live. Minecraft World Hotel and the Escape the Nether rollercoaster were revealed as a part of the attraction in Minecraft Live September 2026.

Plans for the previously announced US theme park have not yet been announced.

== See also ==
- Super Nintendo World
- PokéPark Kanto
