= Minecraft Legends =

2023 video game

- Cover art
- Developers: Mojang Studios; Blackbird Interactive
- Publisher: Xbox Game Studios
- Directors: Pete Gahn; Jonathan Dowdeswell
- Producer: Dave Larmour
- Designer: Alexander Weatherston
- Programmer: Peter Lolley
- Artist: Ian Cumming
- Composer: Crispin Hands
- Series: Minecraft
- Platforms: Nintendo Switch; PlayStation 4; PlayStation 5; Windows; Xbox One; Xbox Series X/S
- Release: April 18, 2023
- Genres: Action, strategy
- Modes: Single-player, multiplayer

Minecraft Legends is a 2023 real-time action-strategy video game developed by Mojang Studios and Blackbird Interactive and published by Xbox Game Studios.

A spin-off of the 2011 sandbox game Minecraft, it was released on Windows, Nintendo Switch, PlayStation 4, PlayStation 5, Xbox One, and Xbox Series X/S on April 18, 2023. The game would later cease development on January 10, 2024.

The goal of the game is to defend the Overworld from an invasion of piglins, pig-like humanoid creatures from the Nether dimension, while the player gradually strengthens their structures and troops with resources harvested. The game received mixed reviews from critics, with its gameplay being both praised for its execution and criticized for its repetitive nature.

== Gameplay ==
Overworld screenshot

Minecraft Legends is set in the Minecraft Overworld, an earth-like dimension filled with various biomes and natural resources that is currently under attack from the piglin hordes from the Nether dimension. The Overworld contains friendly villages, hostile piglin outposts, and the Well of Fate (the player spawnpoint and fast-travel hub). Similarly to Minecraft, the Overworld is procedurally generated, resulting in a unique world for each playthrough of the game.

Players collect resources to construct defenses, upgrade buildings, and summon troops. Players collect basic resources such as wood and stone by assigning friendly Allays to harvest them from deposits found in the Overworld. Other resources, such as redstone and lapis lazuli are used to build advanced structures and summon stronger troops but are locked behind Well of Fate upgrades. Prismarine, which is needed to construct some buildings, can only be collected by defeating piglin structures. The player can use resources they've collected to construct buildings and upgrade the Well of Fate. Defensive fortifications such as walls and turrets protect friendly villages and player outposts. Spawners summon friendly troops the players can recruit into their army. Offensive structures such as the redstone cannon, hurl explosive shells at targets from long range. Upgrading the Well of Fate unlocks more advanced buildings and troops.

The primary goal of combat is to destroy piglin outposts and defend friendly villages from periodic piglin raids. Players use their summoned troops to assault and destroy piglin outposts. Players travel around the Overworld on their mount, from which they can issue various orders command their army on the battlefield. These commands include orders to rally, halt, and charge. Players can also use their sword to attack enemies directly. Players build their army by constructing spawner buildings that summon troops or recruiting troops from camps found throughout the Overworld.

Minecraft Legends incorporates the same Minecoins currency as Minecraft Bedrock Edition. This currency is used to purchase additional skins and mounts within the game. The game is sold with an optional "Deluxe Skin Pack", which contains six additional in-game skins: one hero skin and five mount skins.

== Plot ==
The game begins with the player mining in a cave when they are greeted by three beings: Action, Knowledge, and Foresight. These beings are called Hosts, caretakers of the Overworld. These three persuade the player to help them save their world, where a war has broken out between the Nether and the Overworld. The player is then transported to that world. After completing a tutorial, the player must save a few villages from being invaded by piglins from the Nether. Then, the player destroys three nether outposts that are preparing to invade villages. Subsequently, the player destroys nine Nether portals from three different world areas. In each of these three areas, the player has to defeat a piglin boss: "the Devourer," "the Beast," and "the Unbreakable". Once the player destroys all of the portals and defeats all of the bosses, the player fights the final boss: "the Great Hog."

Just as the player defeats the Great Hog, it makes a last attempt at destroying the Well of Fate. This backfires and its army is swallowed by a portal that sends them back to the Nether. Then, the Great Hog finally dies. After the battle, there is a grand celebration in the Overworld of their win over the piglins. Not all is well, however. The warrior villagers, who fought alongside the hero, resent the pacifistic villagers who did not, which causes a rift between the two groups. In addition to this, the Hosts have left the world to the Hero's responsibility and moved on.

== Development ==
Minecraft Legends began development around 2018. The game was announced during the Xbox and Bethesda Games Showcase on June 12, 2022. After the show, a trailer on the Minecraft YouTube channel confirmed additional platforms. It is developed by series creators Mojang Studios in collaboration with Blackbird Interactive, a team founded by former Relic Entertainment employees, who are best known for developing the real-time strategy video game series Homeworld. After the success of Minecraft Dungeons, another spin-off of Minecraft, Minecraft Legends was released on April 18, 2023.

It was released and was available to play on Nintendo Switch, PlayStation 5, PlayStation 4, Steam, Windows 11|10, PC Game Pass, Xbox Game Pass, Xbox Series X/S, Xbox One, and Xbox Cloud Gaming. On January 10, 2024, Mojang announced that no more updates will be released for Minecraft Legends.

== Reception ==
Reception

Aggregate score
Aggregator	Score
Metacritic	(PC) 65/100 (XSXS) 71/100

Review scores
Publication	Score
Destructoid	7/10
Digital Trends	3.5/5
Game Informer	7/10
GameRevolution	7/10
GameSpot	6/10
GamesRadar+	2.5/5
IGN	7/10
NME	4/5
PC Gamer (US)	50/100
PCGamesN	7/10
PCMag	2.5/5
Shacknews	8/10
VG247	3/5
VideoGamer.com	7/10

Reception of the game was generally mixed. According to the review aggregator website Metacritic, Minecraft Legends received "mixed or average" reviews. Critics viewed the game as a solid addition to the Minecraft franchise but offered differing opinions on its execution. Destructoid writer Timothy Monbleau expressed newfound appreciation for both Minecraft and the strategy genre after playing the game, while Sarah Thwaites of Game Informer described the game as feeling "caught between the expected complexity of strategy games and the franchise’s approachable brand."

Critics generally found the gameplay fun but repetitive and lacking in depth. They praised the game for its Minecraft-themed art style, resource gathering mechanics, and base-building gameplay. Critics also liked the multiplayer co-op and PvP modes. Some reviewers criticized the game's lack of strategic depth, poor AI, and tedious gameplay.
