= Minecraft (book) =

2013 book by Daniel Goldberg and Linus Larsson

Minecraft: The Unlikely Tale of Markus "Notch" Persson and the Game That Changed Everything
- First edition
- Authors: Daniel Goldberg, Linus Larsson
- Audio read by: Jonathan Davis
- Original title: Minecraft: Block, pixlar och att göra sig en hacka
- Translator: Jennifer Hawkins
- Language: Swedish
- Subjects: Minecraft, Markus Persson, Mojang
- Genre: Biography
- Publisher: Norstedts förlag, Seven Stories Press
- Publication date: September 13, 2012
- English publication date: October 17, 2013
- Pages: 256
- ISBN: 978-1-609-80537-1

Minecraft: The Unlikely Tale of Markus "Notch" Persson and the Game That Changed Everything is a book written by Daniel Goldberg and Linus Larsson (and translated by Jennifer Hawkins) about the story of Minecraft and its creator, Markus "Notch" Persson. The book was released on October 17, 2013, and includes many different tips and tricks for the game.

== Content ==
The book is a biography of Persson that also covers Minecraft's popularity and the Swedish gaming industry. The book describes how Persson was inspired by games like Dungeon Keeper, Dwarf Fortress, and Infiniminer, and how he was convinced that he was onto something big from the very beginning. It also described how Persson documented the development openly and in continual dialogue with other players.

== Publication history ==
The book was first published by Norstedts förlag in Sweden in 2012, under the title Minecraft: block, pixlar och att göra sig en hacka (ISBN 9789113049250). An English translation by Jennifer Hawkins was published in 2013 by Seven Stories Press, who claimed that it was the first book about Minecraft to be written in that language.

== Reception ==
The book was described by John Biggs of TechCrunch as "beautifully human". Its portrayal of Persson was praised by Publishers Weekly as "moving" and by Paul Stenis in Library Journal as "compelling", but was criticized by Nick Kolakowski of the Washington Independent Review of Books for being too shallow.
