= Minecraft Earth =

2019 video game

- Developers: Mojang Studios; Blackbird Interactive
- Publisher: Xbox Game Studios
- Directors: Torfi Frans Olafsson; Craig Leigh
- Composer: Shauny Jang
- Series: Minecraft
- Platforms: Android; iOS; iPadOS
- Release: 17 October 2019; 7 years ago; (early access)
- Genres: Augmented reality; sandbox; location-based game
- Modes: Single-player; multiplayer

Minecraft Earth was an augmented reality and geolocation-based sandbox game developed by Mojang Studios and Blackbird interactive and published by Xbox Game Studios. A spin-off of the video game Minecraft, it was first announced in May 2019, and was available on Android and iOS. The game was free-to-play, and was first released in early access on 17 October 2019. The game received its final update in January 2021 and officially ended support and shut down on 30 June 2021 due to the COVID-19 pandemic.

== Gameplay ==
Similar to Minecraft, Minecraft Earth was centered around building structures, gathering resources, crafting, and exploration. The game utilized the same Bedrock game engine as most other versions of Minecraft. In "build mode", players could build augmented reality structures on "Buildplates" in collaboration with other players, then explore them in full size with "play mode". In both Build mode and Play mode, the buildplates were overlaid onto the real world using augmented reality (AR) and the built-in phone camera. Players could gather resources by collecting "tappables" in the in-game map and by completing "adventures" which may be a puzzle, a specific task, or a virtual location with hostile entities to defeat. Minecraft Earth considers physical objects such as trees and lakes so there are fewer incidents and interferences with the AR simulation.

Minecraft Earth included many different kinds of in-game entities called "mobs" that are exclusive variations of the mobs in Minecraft. The game had two in-game currencies: "rubies" and "minecoins". Rubies could be earned through gameplay or purchased with real money and could be used to purchase items that affect gameplay such as "build plates". Minecoins, which are present in all Bedrock editions of Minecraft, could only be purchased with real money and are used to purchase cosmetic items, such as texture packs and character skins. In the final update, Mojang removed all real-money microtransactions, reduced in-game currency costs, and reduced crafting/smelting times in order for players to "get the most out" of the game before it shut down.

== Development ==
Minecraft Earth utilized information from OpenStreetMap for map information and was built on Microsoft Azure for its augmented reality features. Minecraft Earth's world map was generated using global OpenStreetMap data and divided into "several billion equally-sized chunks," allowing the game to determine player-accessible areas for spawning tappables and Adventures. The game was free-to-play, and supported Android and iOS smartphones.

During Microsoft Build 2015, Microsoft's HoloLens team unveiled an augmented reality version of Minecraft. On 8 May 2019, a teaser trailer was released which showed a Muddy Pig. Minecraft Earth was announced during Minecraft's 10th anniversary in May 2019. Microsoft created a website for players to signup for the closed beta that was released during mid-2019, and Microsoft intended to release the game in a gradual rollout. Multiplayer gameplay was showcased at the Apple Worldwide Developers Conference in June 2019.

== Release ==
A closed beta was first released for iOS on 16 July 2019 in Seattle and London, then in Stockholm, Tokyo, and Mexico City over the next two days. Android users in these cities gained access to the closed beta on 30 August 2019.

Minecraft Earth was first released in early access in Iceland and New Zealand on 17 October 2019, and slowly rolled out in other countries in the following weeks, such as the United States in November. According to Sensor Tower estimates reported by AR Insider, Minecraft Earth reached approximately 1.2 million downloads and generated nearly $93,000 in its first full week of availability. It was made available globally on 11 December 2019 (it was not available in China, Cuba, Iran, Myanmar, Sudan, Iraq, and UAE).

On 5 January 2021, developer Mojang Studios announced that they were releasing the final build of Minecraft Earth, citing the COVID-19 pandemic as a factor. Geekwire reported that Mojang cited the COVID-19 pandemic and its impact on real-world movement as the primary reason for ending development on Minecraft Earth. Mojang added that they would be ending support for Minecraft Earth on 30 June 2021. On 30 June 2021, Mojang ended support for Minecraft Earth, and the game was removed from app stores following the announcement. The game's servers were also shut down and dismantled, and opening the app as of 2026 now displays a sunset screen.

== Reception ==
Newshub described the game as "hugely ambitious". Research firm Sensor Tower reported that it was downloaded 1.4 million times in its first week of release, with 1.2 million from the United States.

=== Awards ===
The game was nominated for "Best VR/AR Game" at the Game Critics Awards, and won the Coney Island Dreamland Award for Best AR/VR Game at the New York Game Awards. Time magazine listed Minecraft Earth as one of the Best 100 Inventions of 2019.

== Legacy ==
One of the game's songs, "Earth", was featured as downloadable content in Nintendo's 2018 crossover fighting game Super Smash Bros. Ultimate, in the form of a remix composed by Mitsuhiro Kitadani. This new arrangement was added to the game on 13 October 2020, as part of Challenger Pack 7 within Super Smash Bros. Ultimate's Fighters Pass Vol. 2 season pass.

Many of the game's previously exclusive mobs were featured as pets in the Fauna Faire Adventure Pass for Minecraft Dungeons on 19 October 2022. These include: Dairy Cow, Wooly Cow, Cluckshroom, and Vested Rabbit.
