= Minecraft Dungeons =

2020 video game

- Developers: Mojang Studios; Double Eleven
- Publisher: Xbox Game Studios
- Director: Måns Olson
- Producers: Annica Strand; Steven Taarland
- Designers: Daniel Brynolf; Laura de Llorens Garcia; Matthew Dunthorne
- Programmer: Niklas Börestam
- Artist: Daniel Björkefer
- Composers: Johan Johnson; Peter Hont
- Series: Minecraft
- Engine: Unreal Engine 4
- Platforms: Nintendo Switch; PlayStation 4; Windows; Xbox One; Xbox Series X/S; Arcade
- Release: May 26, 2020; Arcade; May 2021
- Genre: Dungeon crawler
- Modes: Single-player, multiplayer

Minecraft Dungeons is a 2020 dungeon crawler video game developed by Mojang Studios and Double Eleven and published by Xbox Game Studios. It is a spin-off of the sandbox game Minecraft and was released for the Nintendo Switch, PlayStation 4, Windows, and Xbox One in May 2020. The game was later released on Steam on September 22, 2021. It was also adapted into an arcade video game by Raw Thrills, which released in May 2021. Development concluded in November 2022 with the release of the final content update for the game, version 1.17. Mojang officially announced the end of development on September 28, 2023, at which point the game had reached 25 million players across all platforms.

Minecraft Dungeons received generally positive reviews upon release; critics deemed the game fun, charming, and as having excellent visuals and music. However, its simple gameplay and use of procedural generation were met with a more mixed reception, while its short story and lack of depth were criticized. A sequel, Minecraft Dungeons II, was released on September 29, 2026.

== Gameplay ==
Unlike Minecraft, Minecraft Dungeons does not feature mining or building. Instead, it is a hack and slash-styled dungeon crawler, rendered from an isometric perspective. Players venture through procedurally generated and hand crafted dungeons filled with randomly-generated monsters and also deal with traps, puzzles, bosses and finding treasure. Areas are divided into levels rather than being open world. There is no class system; players can use any weapon or armor they wish. The game includes four-player local and online multiplayer.

Following the release of the final DLC, Mojang introduced Seasonal Adventures, a free content update system that added new gameplay modes and progression systems. The first season, Cloudy Climb, launched on December 14, 2021, and introduced The Tower, a roguelike single-player mode featuring 30 procedurally generated floors that initially refreshed every two weeks. The rotation frequency was later increased to weekly in November 2022. This update also added an Adventure Rank progression system with both free and premium reward tracks available through an Adventure Pass. Luminous Night, the second season, released on April 20, 2022, and featured nighttime Tower exploration along with the Wildfire mob. The third and final season, Fauna Faire, released on October 19, 2022, and added the Enchantsmith merchant, the Treetop Tangle mission, and multiplayer functionality to The Tower.

== Plot ==
Minecraft Dungeons is set in the same fictional world as Minecraft, known as the "Overworld". It consists of rough 3D objects—mainly cubes referred to as "blocks"—representing various materials, and is inhabited by both peaceful and hostile mobs. Unlike Minecraft, the game features a linear, story-driven campaign and cutscenes.

The opening cutscene tells the story of an Illager named Archie, who was driven away by his people. While searching for a new home, he was forced to leave every village he found due to the Villagers being scared of him. One day, Archie stumbled upon a powerful artifact known as the Orb of Dominance, which granted him magic powers but also corrupted him. Now known as the "Arch-Illager", he sought vengeance on all those who wronged him, and subjugated numerous villages with his newly acquired army, composed of creatures such as Redstone Golems, other Illagers, and Pillagers.

Players assume the role of heroes who embark on a quest to defeat the Arch-Illager while liberating oppressed villages, fighting monsters, and completing various quests. Ultimately, the players face the Arch-Illager in his castle and, upon his defeat, the Orb of Dominance takes its true form as the Heart of Ender, the final boss of the game. After destroying the Heart of Ender, Archie is freed from its influence. Rather than punish Archie for his actions, the players show him kindness and forgiveness and quickly befriend him. As the players and Archie depart, the shattered pieces of the orb of dominance are seen moving around.

=== Downloadable content ===
The DLCs follow the protagonist(s) travelling to differently themed islands to hunt down the remaining shards of the orb of dominance. After destroying four of the shards, two enderman find the last one, and take it to the End. To prevent the protagonist(s) from finding the last piece, six Endersent climb out, absorbing the eyes of Ender. After defeating the Endersent and reactivating the portal, the protagonist(s) jump through the portal, entering the End. After tracking down the reincarnated heart of Ender, the protagonist(s) confront the Vengant Heart of Ender, it's true form, freeing the overworld.

== Development ==
Minecraft Dungeons was developed by Mojang Studios for the Xbox One, Windows 10, PlayStation 4, and Nintendo Switch using Unreal Engine 4. Console ports were done by Double Eleven. The game was internally referred as Lovika .

With the continued success of the original Minecraft, Mojang thought about other possible games that could bring something new to the Minecraft universe. Experimenting with different ideas, the game was originally meant to be a single-player dungeon crawler, inspired by The Legend of Zelda series, for the Nintendo 3DS. However, as the game began to take shape, these elements were changed or removed. For example, after adding in multiplayer features, the development team realized that these changes made the game more fun. According to game director Måns Olsen, the game was inspired by Diablo and Torchlight, as well as co-operative first-person shooters like Warhammer: The End Times – Vermintide and Left 4 Dead.

One of the primary challenges the development team faced was figuring out how to adapt the gameplay of dungeon crawl games like Diablo into the world of Minecraft. Since Minecraft characters did not have any special innate abilities, Mojang had to think of alternatives to elements such as character classes that would normally be found in games of that genre. Their solution was to focus on creating weapons and armor that the player could make more powerful through enchantments, allowing the player to explore their creativity through customization.

In addition, Mojang wanted to streamline the traditional dungeon crawl game experience into something more accessible. Olsen remarked that other games in the genre "are approachable to some degree, but they're typically games with very deep, interconnected systems", and that they wanted to make getting into Minecraft Dungeons "super easy" yet "instantly familiar". The decision to not allow building or crafting, a staple of the original Minecraft, was also made in order to focus on the core dungeon-crawling experience. To give more experienced players a challenge, the team added options to change the game's difficulty, which would reward players with better equipment and new secret content for playing on harder difficulties.

Minecraft Dungeons was announced on September 28, 2018, during the Minecon live streaming event. A video showcasing gameplay was released during E3 2019 with an April 2020 release.

== Release ==
Minecraft Dungeons was released on May 26, 2020, after being delayed from its original April release date due to the COVID-19 pandemic. The closed beta for the game ran for a month from March 25 to April 24, 2020.

After the initial release, the game was supported with several downloadable content (DLC) packs that added new dungeons, weapons, items and artifacts. The first expansion, titled Jungle Awakens, was released on July 1, 2020. It was followed by Creeping Winter on September 8, 2020, Howling Peaks on December 9, 2020, Flames of the Nether on February 24, 2021, Hidden Depths on May 26, 2021, and Echoing Void on July 28, 2021. A patch for the Xbox One version of the game including enhancements for Xbox Series X/S consoles was released alongside the Flames of the Nether update. On July 28, 2021, to coincide with the launch of the Echoing Void update, Minecraft Dungeons Ultimate Edition was released, comprising the base game, the six additional content packs, and all Hero Pass cosmetics.

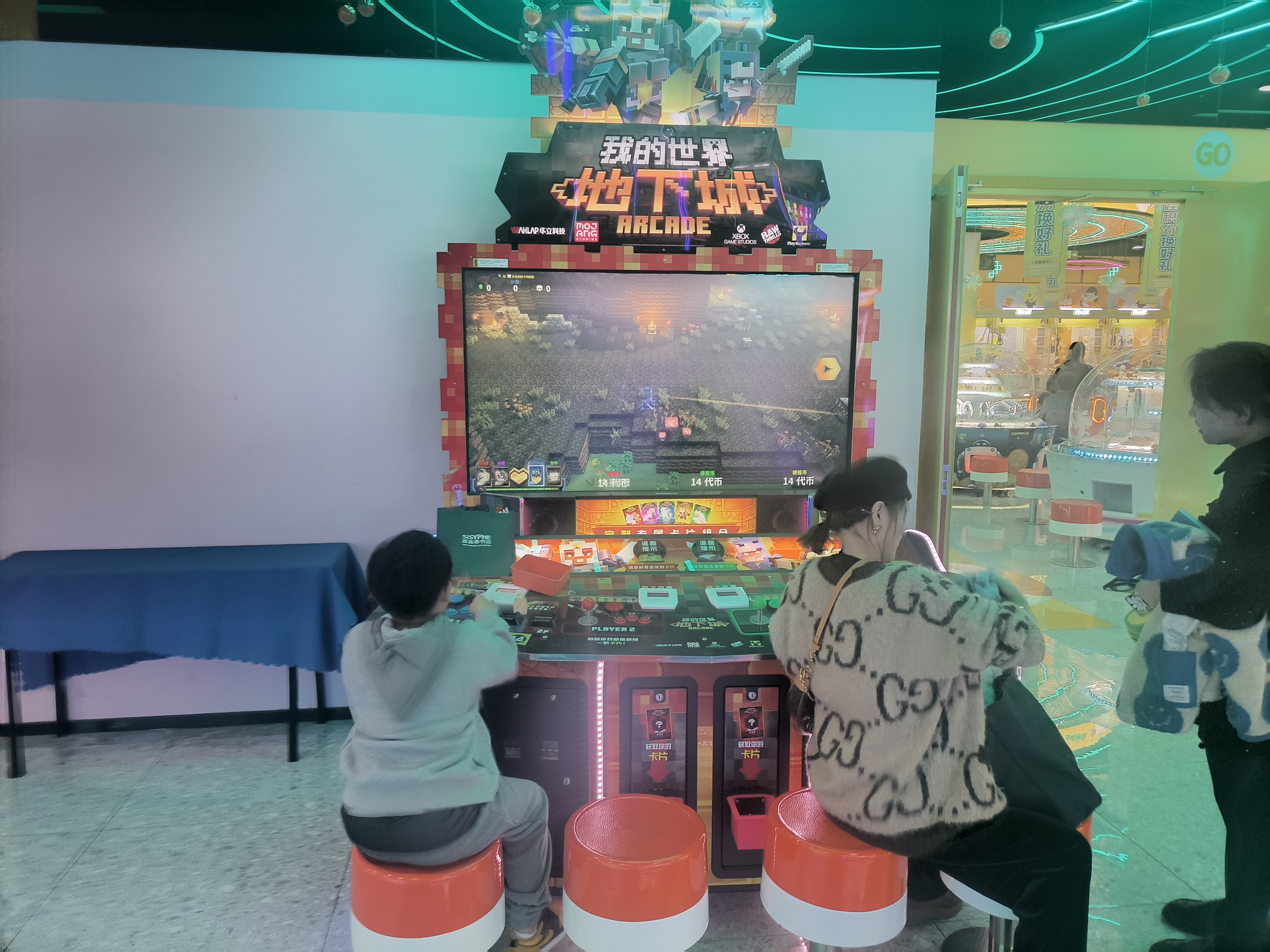
Minecraft Dungeons arcade cabinet

In March 2021, Mojang announced an arcade version of the game associated with collectible cards. Officially licensed from Mojang and Microsoft, it was created by developer Play Mechanix and entertainment company Raw Thrills. The gameplay was changed into a beat-em-up format, similar to games such as Golden Axe. It debuted at Dave & Buster's restaurants in May 2021, and at Sony Pictures' Wonderverse on December 19, 2023.

== Reception ==
Reception

Aggregate scores
Aggregator	Score
Metacritic	(PC) 70/100 (NS) 72/100 (XONE) 74/100 (PS4) 78/100
OpenCritic	47% recommend

Review scores
Publication	Score
Destructoid	8/10
Eurogamer	N/A
Game Informer	7/10
GameSpot	7/10
GamesRadar+	3.5/5
IGN	7/10
PCGamesN	3.5/5
Shacknews	7/10
The Guardian	4/5

Minecraft Dungeons received mixed to positive reviews from critics, according to review aggregator website Metacritic. Fellow review aggregator OpenCritic assessed that the game received fair approval, being recommended by 47% of critics. Critics generally found the game fun and charming, complimenting its visuals and music. Some were divided on Dungeons' simplicity and the procedural generation system used to generate loot and dungeon layouts. Most reviewers were critical of the game's short story mode and perceived lack of depth. Shacknews called it "a fun, laid back dungeon crawler for friends to get into."

The Hero Edition of Minecraft Dungeons sold 11,450 physical copies on the Nintendo Switch within its first week on sale in Japan, making it the fourth best-selling retail game of the week in the country. The game was nominated for Best Family Game at The Game Awards 2020, and for Family at the 17th British Academy Game Awards in 2021. The game had over 15 million players as of February 2022, and approximately 25 million as of April 2024, making it the most successful Minecraft spin-off.

== In other media ==
Three music tracks from Minecraft Dungeons – "Halland", "Dalarna" and "The Arch-Illager" – are featured as downloadable content in the 2018 crossover fighting game Super Smash Bros. Ultimate, with the former two being rearranged into a single track. The songs were added to the game on October 13, 2020, as part of Challenger Pack 7, which features content from the Minecraft franchise, including the default skins Steve and Alex as playable fighters and a stage based on Minecraft biomes.
