= Middle School: The Worst Years of My Life (film) =

2016 American family comedy film

- Theatrical release poster
- Directed by: Steve Carr
- Screenplay by: Chris Bowman; Hubbel Palmer; Kara Holden
- Based on: Middle School: The Worst Years of My Life by: James Patterson; Chris Tebbetts
- Produced by: Leopoldo Gout; Bill Robinson; Marty Eli Shwartz; Heidi Santelli
- Starring: Griffin Gluck; Lauren Graham; Rob Riggle; Thomas Barbusca; Andy Daly; Adam Pally
- Cinematography: Julio Macat
- Edited by: Wendy Greene Bricmont; Craig Herring
- Music by: Jeff Cardoni
- Production companies: J.P. Entertainment; Participant Media
- Distributed by: Lionsgate; CBS Films
- Release date: October 7, 2016
- Running time: 92 minutes
- Country: United States
- Language: English
- Budget: $8.5 million
- Box office: $23 million

Middle School: The Worst Years of My Life is a 2016 American comedy film directed by Steve Carr and written by Chris Bowman, Hubbel Palmer and Kara Holden, based on the 2011 novel of the same name by James Patterson and Chris Tebbetts. The film stars Griffin Gluck, Lauren Graham, Rob Riggle, Isabela Merced, Retta, Thomas Barbusca, Andy Daly, and Adam Pally. It follows Rafael "Rafe" Khatchadorian (Gluck), a middle school student who sets out to break every one of the many rules made by his domineering tyrannical principal (Daly).

Carr accepted the offer to direct the film adaptation after connecting with the character of Rafe, and was given creative freedom by Patterson with his source material, making it a more family-friendly affair and choosing his own cast members. Produced by CBS Films, James Patterson Entertainment and Participant Media, principal photography began in Atlanta, Georgia, lasting from November 2015 to January 2016. Middle School was released by Lionsgate on October 7, 2016. It garnered a mixed reception from critics, with reviews divided over the overall tone and humor throughout the script and filmmaking, and was a moderate box office success and grossed $23 million against an $8.5 million budget.

== Plot ==
Rafael "Rafe" Khatchadorian lives in a middle-class home with his mother Jules, his rebellious younger sister Georgia, and Jules' lazy, child-hating boyfriend (later fiancé) Carl, who goes by the nickname Bear. Rafe has an overactive imagination and is very passionate about his artistic talent and has a friend named Leo who supports his antics.

Though Rafe is not enthusiastic about starting his first day at Hills Village Middle School, he's reminded it's his last option, as he's been kicked out of the other two in the area already. It does not go as he hoped, as he discovers Principal Ken Dwight and Vice-Principal Ida Stricker are even worse than the bullies and the school is filled with rules that are unjustified and unlawful.

After Dwight destroys Rafe's sketchbook by dissolving it in a bucket of acid for drawing a picture of Dwight in his sketchbook teasing him, Rafe and his friend Leo come up with a plan to start a massive "insurrection" against Principal Dwight and Stricker, by breaking every rule in the rule book.

They unleash several pranks on Principal Dwight, Stricker, and the school staff, including putting sticky notes all over the school, filling the teacher's lounge with plastic balls, dyeing Principal Dwight's hair pink, and turning the school's trophy case into a fish tank. He refers to this plan as "Operation: Rules Aren't For Everyone", or R.A.F.E.

As the annual B.L.A.A.R. (BaseLine Assessment of Academic Readiness) test is coming up, Dwight sees an opportunity to improve his school's results (and thereby his own annual bonus) by eliminating Rafe's seemingly underperforming class from the test. Rafe, and the whole class, are suspended for the pranks the day before the test. In addition, Rafe's teacher, Mr. Teller, is fired as Principal Dwight suspects his involvement. Dwight then offers Rafe a deal to let his class take the fall and he'll be the only one not suspended. However, Rafe deliberately sets off the sprinkler system, and Dwight immediately expels him.

Jeanne Galleta, the president of the AV club and Rafe's love interest, shows Rafe that Dwight put fake evidence in their lockers in order to stop their class from taking the B.L.A.A.R. test. Rafe devises a plan to stop the test and expose Dwight and Stricker along with Jeanne, Leo, Georgia, Gus, Miller, and his suspended class. The next day, both Dwight and Stricker are fired after Teller and Superintendent Hwang receive the evidence and decide to press charges on both of them.

As Dwight walks out, he is pranked with green hair dye in his hat. Jules breaks up with Bear after finding out his true nature, and Rafe is reenrolled into HVMS (with Mr. Teller also reinstated) and says goodbye to Leo (now revealed to be Rafe's imagination, a grief manifested flashback of his late younger brother who tragically died from cancer prior to the events of the film), thereby finally coming to terms with Leo's death. He shares a kiss with Jeanne which breaks rule #86, no public displays of affection, thus completing operation R.A.F.E. as Leo watches from his imaginary UFO. The film ends with the two headed aliens in the UFO having a dance party, and a camera viewing Earth.

== Cast ==
- Griffin Gluck as Rafael "Rafe" Khatchadorian, a rule-breaking but well-meaning middle schooler and aspiring cartoonist who attends Hills Village Middle School.
- Lauren Graham as Julie "Jules" Khatchadorian, Rafe's mother.
- Rob Riggle as Carl "Bear", Jules' strict and child-hating boyfriend/fiancé who tries to send Rafe to military school, but ends up getting dumped by Jules when she sees his true self as a "self-centered jerk".
- Thomas Barbusca as Leonardo "Leo" Khatchadorian, Rafe's mischievous imaginary friend and later in the film it is revealed that Leo is a flashback of Rafe's real life younger brother who died from cancer prior to the events of the film and Rafe who refused to accept his brother's tragic death at the time reimagined Leo as an imaginary friend to cope with loss and grief.
- Andy Daly as Principal Kenneth "Ken" Dwight, the tyrannical and exceedingly vain principal of Hills Village Middle School who is obsessed with the B.L.A.A.R. testing and becomes Rafe's main goal of revenge.
- Adam Pally as Mr. Robert Teller, Rafe's friendly and fun-loving English teacher who dislikes Dwight and Stricker's antics.
- Retta as Ida Stricker, the stern vice-principal of Hills Village Middle School and Principal Dwight's accomplice.
- Jacob Hopkins as Miller "the Killer", a bully who targets Rafe, but later joins his plan to battle Dwight.
- Alexa Nisenson as Georgia Khatchadorian, Rafe's rebellious smart younger sister.
- Isabela Merced as Jeanne Galletta, the intelligent president of the AV club, who helps Rafe with his plan and is Rafe's love interest
- Efren Ramirez as Gus, the disgruntled janitor who dislikes Dwight manhandling him and later joins Rafe's plan to get revenge on him.
- Isabella Amara as Heidi
- James A. Patterson as James, a restaurant manager at an Italian restaurant where Bear proposes to Jules on her birthday.
- Gemma Forbes as Dana, a waitress at Dave & Buster's whom Bear flirts with.
- Jessi Goei as Bella, a phone addictive girl who joins Rafe's plan to get revenge on Dwight.
- Luke Hardeman as Shon, one of Teller's students who joins Rafe's plans of revenge.
- Angela Oh as Superintendent Danielle Hwang, the superintendent of the school district that Hills Village Middle School is in.
- Montana Jacobowitz as Laughing Girl, a student at Hills Village Middle School.
- Animation voices provided by Jeremy Culhane, Stephen Kearin, Tom Kenny, Mike Matzdorf, Michael Rapaport, and Jacob Vargas.

== Development ==
On August 4, 2015, it was announced that Steve Carr would direct the film adaptation of James Patterson's 2011 novel Middle School: The Worst Years of My Life, with a script written by Chris Bowman and Hubbel Palmer. Although Carr originally planned his next project to be an R-rated comedy, he accepted the offer to direct the film due to his connection with the character of Rafe, as he would doodle out his angst during his early teen years; this became a habit throughout his film career, as he would doodle what shots would look like to cinematographers he worked with. Patterson gave Carr a lot of freedom from the source material, and the director chose to make the film adaptation more of a family movie than the young-kid-oriented book. He was also able to choose cast members for Middle School, which was unlike his past projects and he appreciated that as he was able to choose some "great improvisational comics."

Other details were announced on August 4, such as Griffin Gluck playing Rafe Khatchadorian, Leopoldo Gout and Bill Robinson producing the film, CBS Films producing it as well as handling international sales, and Lionsgate handling domestic distribution for CBS. Jacob Hopkins came in planning to play characters besides Miller The Killer. During audition shoots, Hopkins pushed Gluck's character around out of playfulness instead of bad faith, but Carr interpreted him as "upbeat and really physical" enough for a bully character. He improvised gags into the film, such as a running gag where he makes fun of Rafe's last name Khatchadorian.

On November 12, 2015, more cast were announced for the film, whose script was also written by Kara Holden; it was also announced that Patterson would co-finance the film through his James Patterson Entertainment, along with Participant Media and CBS Films.

Holden categorized Middle School as a comedy-drama film with a moral of learning and making the best out of difficult situations. In writing the female characters, Holden tried to make them unique from the "boilerplate girl" types typical in other films: "I definitely wanted them to be full of life like the girls that I know and to have that spunk." She used the "fun, spunk and spirit" of her niece to write Georgia, and the "alter ego of what I wished I could be" to flesh out Jeanne's character.

== Production ==
Principal photography on the film began on November 21, 2015, in Atlanta, Georgia, and wrapped on January 19, 2016. For the school, Fulton County Instructional Technology Center were used for interior shots and Atlanta International School and Westlake High School for exteriors. Houses in the neighborhoods of Edgewood and Lake Claire were locations for sequences in Rafe's home, while Kevin Rathbun Steak on Krog Street was used for the restaurant scene. Other locations include MARTA's Lindbergh Center station, Kirkwood, and a part of Irwin Street close to Inman Park.

== Release ==
CBS Films distributed the film through its partnership with Lionsgate Films. The film also incorporated a guerrilla marketing technique where CBS representatives went to elementary and middle schools across the United States for hanging posters and holding screenings. On social media, the film garnered several posts by Patterson and stars Riggle and Graham, and RelishMix reported the film gaining attention from fans of the book comparing it to Diary of a Wimpy Kid. Airing of commercials for the film began on September 6, 2016; the film had the fifth-highest investing in television advertising on the weekend of October 9 with $3.9 million, with 14 advertisements airing 761 times on 26 networks, totaling its TV spending to $14.6 million. On October 4, Entertainment Weekly's website exclusively posted the Post-It notes scene.

The film was released on October 7, 2016.

=== Box office ===
Brad Brevet of Box Office Mojo projected an opening weekend gross of $6.8 million due to its source material being lower-profile than those of similar films such as Diary of a Wimpy Kid (2010), Alexander and the Terrible, Horrible, No Good, Very Bad Day (2014), and The DUFF (2015). Other sources projected a gross of $8–10 million from 2,822 theaters during its opening weekend. Other new entries that weekend included the thriller The Girl on the Train and Nate Parker's controversial period film The Birth of a Nation. It was projected to gross in total more than $20 million.

That weekend, the top five consisted of films continuing their runs except for the number-one debut The Girl on the Train. The Birth of a Nation and Middle School: The Worst Years of My Life competed neck-and-neck for the number-six spot; ultimately, Middle School took seventh place grossing $6.9 million with The Birth of a Nation above it grossing $7.1 million. Middle School's opening weekend audience included an equal amount of male and female viewers, 54% of it being under 18 and 42% over 25.

It finished its theatrical run with a total gross of $23.3 million, making it a moderate success against its $8.5 million production budget.

=== Critical response ===
Middle School: The Worst Years of My Life received mixed reviews from critics. On the review aggregator website Rotten Tomatoes, 66% of 44 critics' reviews are positive, with an average rating of 5.7/10. Metacritic, which uses a weighted average, assigned the film a score of 51 out of 100, based on 13 critics, indicating "mixed or average" reviews. Audiences polled by CinemaScore gave the film an average grade of "A−" on an A+ to F scale. In PostTrak exit surveys, which had 59% of those polled between the ages of 10–12, 80% of kids scored the film positively while only 31% of parents recommended the film.

Variety's Joe Leydon commended director Steve Carr for grounding the film's comedic aspects in a "candy-colored facsimile" of reality and the cast for admirably performing their roles, highlighting both Gluck and Daly as "well-matched opponents", calling it: "A youth-skewing comedy-fantasy with possible cross-generational appeal." Deborah Dundas of the Toronto Star praised the performances from the cast and the overall humor and aesthetics that appear throughout the film, concluding that: "As they manage the world between childhood and being a teenager, this film gives middle school kids a way to deal with their shared experience — overbearing adults, school bullies, first crushes, impossible rules — and giggle at the things that grind 'em down."

Marjorie Baumgarten of The Austin Chronicle found the film to be reminiscent of the teen movies of John Hughes, saying that: "Deft filmmaking moves quickly past the film's implausibilities (like how Rafe pulls off some of his more elaborate stunts in the limited overnight hours, or how he even physically gets back to school), and particularly good performances by the cast's younger members help make the story credible." The Hollywood Reporter's Frank Scheck also felt the movie channeled its inner Hughes, calling it Ferris Bueller's Day Off for the tween demographic. He added that the film "delivers an easily digestible and amusing portrait of youthful hijinks that should well please its target audience […] prove modestly successful in its theatrical release before enjoying a long life in home video formats."

Jesse Hassenger of The A.V. Club gave the film a "C−" grade. He wrote: "Though its title and general tone lament the stifling atmosphere of the years between childhood and full-fledged teenhood, the movie misses the animal hostility and physical awkwardness of genuine tweens." Keith Watson of Slant Magazine wrote that despite the "good-natured irreverence" throughout the plot and the capability of its adult-aged comedic actors making moments "winsomely breezy," he felt it was by-the-numbers overall saying: "Unimaginatively directed and indifferently shot, the film never establishes a distinctive voice for itself." Alonso Duralde of TheWrap felt the writing throughout the movie, despite displaying its younger actors as being "consistently endearing", hampered any moments of comedy and drama to feel "strained and mawkish," making the plot come across more as "a third-rate Saved by the Bell knock-off than a legitimate teen flick." Tom Russo of The Boston Globe found the adaptation "comedically flat" with its squandered visual gags and contributions from its adult cast, putting it alongside similar films like Diary of a Wimpy Kid and Alexander and the Terrible, Horrible, No Good, Very Bad Day.

=== Home media ===
The film was released on Blu-ray and DVD on January 3, 2017 by Lionsgate Home Entertainment.

== Accolades ==
Year	Award	Category	Recipient(s)	Result	Ref.
2016	Young Entertainer Award	Best Young Ensemble Cast - Feature Film	Ensemble cast	Nominated	
2017	Annie Awards	Best Animated Special Production	Middle School: The Worst Years of My Life	Nominated	
2017	Young Artist Award	Best Performance in a Feature Film – Supporting Young Actress	Alexa Nisenson	Won	
