= Allison Schroeder =

American screenwriter

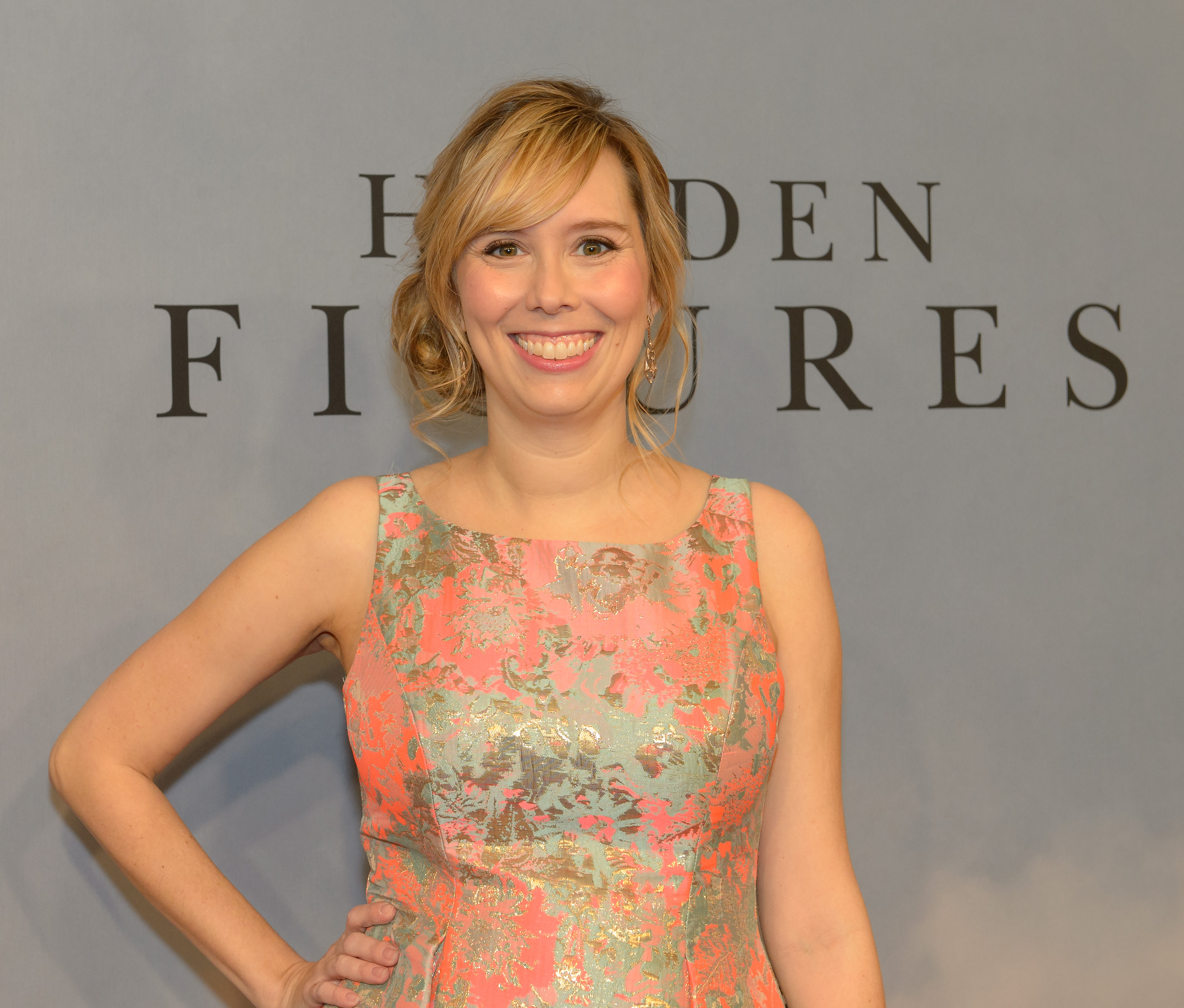
- Schroeder at the film premiere of Hidden Figures in 2016
- Born: Florida, U.S.
- Education: Stanford University; University of Southern California (MFA)
- Occupations: Screenwriter, film director, film producer
- Years active: 2007–present
- Spouse: Aaron Brownstein (m. 2016)
- Children: 1

Allison Schroeder is an American screenwriter and producer. She co-wrote the film Hidden Figures with Theodore Melfi, earning a nomination for the Academy Award for Best Adapted Screenplay. Schroeder's other writing credits include Christopher Robin, Frozen II, Heart of Stone, and the newest of her writings, A Minecraft Movie.

== Early and personal life ==
Schroeder graduated from Melbourne High School in Florida. While in high school, Schroeder interned at NASA, where Schroeder's grandparents worked. She majored in economics at Stanford University, and after working as a consultant for two years, Schroeder went to University of Southern California to earn a Masters of Fine Arts in the Film Production Program.

In 2016, Schroeder married writer Aaron Brownstein. They have a daughter, Emily, born in 2016.

== Career ==
Schroeder began her writing career as a staff writer on 90210 and also wrote two made-for-TV movies. She then went on to create the show Side Effects, a musical drama about a teenage girl and her family. Side Effects originally debuted in 2013 as a long-form special on the AwesomenessTV YouTube channel, co-produced by AwesomenessTV and Universal Cable Productions. It then went on to air as a 90-minute special on E!.

In 2013, she also sold her spec script Agatha to Paramount Pictures with Will Gluck attached to direct; Disruption Entertainment’s Mary Parent and Cale Boyter were producing along with Benderspink. The script was described as an action adventure which surmises what really happened to Agatha Christie during the 11 days she went missing.

In 2014, producer Donna Gigliotti hired Schroeder to pen the script for Hidden Figures, after optioning the book proposal by Margot Shetterly. Schroeder interned at NASA and her grandfather and grandmother also worked there, providing her with first-hand insight in the world of NASA. She won Best Adapted Screenplay at the Humanitas and Veritas Awards for co-writing Hidden Figures. Schroeder was also nominated for an Academy Award, BAFTA, and WGA Award.

After Hidden Figures, Schroeder went on to co-write Christopher Robin starring Ewan McGregor for Disney, in which she said she spent months thinking up "Pooh-isms." Schroeder was nominated for a second Humanitas Award for co-writing the script.

In 2017, she also took out a pitch for a movie about Susan Fowler, the Uber engineer whistleblower. Good Universe beat out three other bidders to land Disruptors with Schroeder penning the script and Kristin Burr producing.

In 2018, Schroeder joined Frozen II to co-write with Jennifer Lee. Frozen II ended up breaking box office records, earning well-over a billion dollars.

Schroeder was then tapped in 2019 to pen a script for the video game adaption of Minecraft at Warner Brothers.

In August 2023, Netflix released Heart of Stone, an action-thriller starring Gal Gadot whose script was written by Schroeder and Greg Rucka. The film was directed by Tom Harper and had over 100 million views on Netflix, making it one of the most watched films on Netflix in 2023.

In March 2025, Warner Bros. and Vertigo Entertainment released A Minecraft Movie, an action adventure comedy film. The script for this film was written by Chris Bowman, Hubbel Palmer, and Schroeder, adding to her list of successful movies. It was directed by Jared Hess. The film has become the biggest film of the year reaching $200 million in seven days, besting Captain America: Brave New World.

== Filmography ==
=== Film and television ===
Year	Title	Credited as		Notes
Year	Title	Writer	Other	Notes
2007	Jay and Seth versus the Apocalypse	No	Yes	Script supervisor and construction crew Short film
2007–2008	Smallville	No	Yes	Production assistant: 15 episodes
2008	Pineapple Express	No	Yes	Production assistant
2008	90210	Yes	No	Episode: "That Which We Destroy"; Co-wrote with Caprice Crane
2008	The Victoria's Secret Fashion Show	No	Yes	Show coordinator TV special
2011	Mean Girls 2	Yes	No	Television film Co-wrote with Cliff Ruby and Elana Lesser
2012	Free Samples	No	Yes	Special thanks
2015	Guidance	Yes	No	Web series
2016	Hidden Figures	Yes	No	Co-wrote with Theodore Melfi
2018	Christopher Robin	Yes	No	Co-wrote with Alex Ross Perry and Tom McCarthy
2019	Frozen II	Yes	Yes	Additional screenplay material Uncredited soundtrack writing
2023	Heart of Stone	Yes	No	Co-wrote with Greg Rucka
2025	A Minecraft Movie	Story	No	Co-story writer with Chris Bowman and Hubbel Palmer

== Awards and nominations ==
For - Hidden Figures (with Theodore Melfi)

- Nominated: Academy Award for Best Adapted Screenplay
- Nominated: BAFTA Award for Best Screenplay
- Nominated: USC Scripter Award
- Nominated: Satellite Award for Best Adapted Screenplay
- Nominated: Writers Guild of America Award for Best Adapted Screenplay
- Winner: Humanitas Prize for Feature Film (tied with Hacksaw Ridge)
