= M or F? =

2005 book by Lisa Papademetriou and Chris Tebbetts

- Author: Lisa Papademetriou
- Language: English
- Genre: Young adult novel
- Publisher: Penguin
- Publication date: 2005
- Publication place: United States
- Media type: Print (Paperback)
- Pages: 296 pp
- ISBN: 1-59514-091-3
- OCLC: 58829776

M or F? is a 2005 American young-adult novel written by Lisa Papademetriou and Chris Tebbetts.

== Plot ==
Frannie Falconer has a crush on Jeffrey Osbourne, but is shy around him, so her gay best friend Marcus Beaureg suggests that she chat with him online, as it takes away some of the nausea of face-to-face conversation. That does not work, so Marcus decides to write conversations for her. At first, this works because Frannie is hovering over his shoulder, however Marcus continues the conversations when Frannie is not around and it is unclear exactly who Jeffrey likes. Frannie worries that Marcus may be jealous of her spending time with Jeffrey and his group. Frannie finds out that Marcus has been posing as her online and they get into a fight. She calls Jenn, another friend, and they realize that Jeffrey was not falling for Frannie, but for 'Marcus posing as Frannie. Frannie seduces Jeffrey by wearing a negligee and serving him ginseng-laced hot cacao, but when he throws up, she decides he must be gay. Marcus and Frannie reconcile, and she tells him of her suspicions of Jeffrey's sexuality. They decide to take Jeffrey to a meeting of the school's Gay-Straight Alliance, but this does not give them any information, so Marcus decides hook up with Jeffrey. While waiting for Marcus to see a movie, Glenn, Jeffrey's best friend, shows up, telling her that Marcus told him to go there. Marcus calls, telling Frannie he cannot make it and she realizes that Marcus is setting her up with Glenn. She tells Glenn about it, and he reveals that he is gay and denies that Jeffrey is. Frannie and Glenn rush to Buckingham Fountain, where Marcus is just about to kiss Jeffrey. Everything gets sorted out, and Jeffrey confesses that he needed help with the online conversations as well, so Glenn helped him, and eventually the same thing that happened with Marcus and Frannie happened with them. Jeffrey and Frannie leave, while Glenn talks to Marcus and kisses him. Frannie tells Jeffrey that they would be better off as friends. In the end, Glenn ends up with Marcus, the German girl Astrid is hitting on Jeffrey, and Frannie ends up with a freaky quasi-cowboy she met at a line-dancing place Marcus's grandmother made them go.

== Stage Adaptation ==
On January 24, 2015, a staged reading adaptation of the book with movement, plus simple costumes and sets was performed at the Chandler Music Hall in Randolph, Vermont for Vermont Pride Theater. It was adapted by Gene Hinerich and directed by Cher Laston. It starred Alex Verret (credited as Kieran Verret) as Marcus, and Gabriella Atkinson as Frannie.
