= Middle School: Get Me Out of Here! =

2012 novel by James Patterson

- First edition
- Author: James Patterson; Chris Tebbetts
- Illustrator: Laura Park
- Language: English
- Series: Middle School
- Genre: Comedy
- Publisher: Little, Brown and Company
- Publication date: May 7, 2012
- Publication place: United States
- Media type: Print (hardcover, paperback)
- Pages: 283
- Preceded by: Middle School: The Worst Years of My Life

Middle School: Get Me Out of Here! is the second novel in James Patterson's best selling Middle School series, preceded by Middle School: The Worst Years of My Life, both co-authored by Chris Tebbetts. It was published in the United States by Little, Brown and Company on May 7, 2012. The book is about Rafe Khatchadorian.

== Plot ==
Rafe is sitting on a large tub of pickles in the storage room of Swifty's Diner, where his Mum, Jules, is employed. He is working on his school things.

Then the burger grill, that Swifty (Jack) uses to cook orders, and which has not been cleaned in a while, goes up in flames. His Mum evacuates him, but they end up watching the place burn down.

Without Swifty's Diner, Jules cannot earn money. Without money, she can't pay the rent, and without rent, they have no house. So they go to Rafe's grandmother's house, in a run-down rural area, which he thinks is gross.

He trades his previous Operation: R.A.F.E (Rules Aren't For Everyone) for Operation: Get A Life.

As he starts seventh grade, he encounters many problems, not only with Operation: Get A Life but with bullies as well.

== Reception ==
Middle School: Get Me Out of Here! was a No. 1 New York Times Bestseller, an Indiebound Bestseller and one of Barnes & Noble's Best Books of 2012.

== Sequels ==
- Middle School: My Brother Is a Big, Fat Liar (2013, with co-author Lisa Papademetriou), this book is told from Rafe's sister, Georgia's point of view. Georgia starts middle school and makes a bet with Rafe that she can excel in places he failed.
- Middle School: How I Survived Bullies, Broccoli, and Snake Hill (2013, with co-author Chris Tebbetts), this book follows Rafe's experiences at a camp known as Camp Wannamorra.
- Middle School: Ultimate Showdown (22 May 2014, with co-author Julia Bergen), this book is an interactive activity book featuring stories and activities with Rafe and Georgia.
- Middle School: Save Rafe! (9 October 2014, with co-author Chris Tebbetts), in this book, Rafe takes an outdoor survival course to get back in school.
- Middle School: Just My Rotten Luck (22 June 2015), Rafe returns to Hills Village Middle School, joins the football team and plans a major art project.
- Middle School: Rafe’s Aussie Adventure (2015), which was republished as Middle School: Escape to Australia in 2017 with new illustrations
- Middle School: Dog's Best Friend (2016)
- Middle School: From Hero to Zero (2018)
- Middle School: Born to Rock (2019)
- Middle School: Master of Disaster (2020)
- Middle School: Field Trip Fiasco (2021)
- Middle School: It’s a Zoo In Here! (2021)
- Middle School: Winter Blunderland (2022)
- Middle School: Million Dollar Mess (2024)
- Middle School: Too Uncool For school (2025)

Related books

- How I Got Lost in London (27 February 2014) World Book Day story, featuring Rafe on a school trip to England.
- Public School Superhero (7 May 2015, with co-author Chris Tebbetts), Kenny Wright is a "Grandma's Boy" struggling with sixth grade in a tough inner city school. But in his imagination he is Stainlezz Steel, costumed crimefighter. (UK title: Kenny Wright, Superhero)

== Film adaptation ==
James Patterson confirmed a sequel to the Middle School: The Worst Years of My Life film is currently in development as of April 16, 2020.
