= Get a Clue (disambiguation) =

Get a Clue is a 2002 Disney Channel Original Movie starring Lindsay Lohan.

Get a Clue may also refer to:

- Get a Clue (1997 film), a film based on the novel The Westing Game by Ellen Raskin
- "Get a Clue", a song by Prozzäk from their album Ready Ready Set Go, and the theme song from the 2002 film
- Get a Clue, a Lizzie McGuire book
- "Get a Clue", a round in the 2014 television game show Win, Lose or Draw
- Get a Clue, an online curriculum produced by FableVision
- Mary-Kate and Ashley: Get a Clue, a 2000 Mary-Kate and Ashley video game
- Get a Clue (game show), a 2020 Game Show Network original series hosted by Rob Belushi

== See also ==
- Shaggy & Scooby-Doo Get a Clue!, an American animated television series
