= A Minecraft Movie =

2025 film directed by Jared Hess

- Theatrical release poster
- Directed by: Jared Hess
- Screenplay by: Chris Bowman; Hubbel Palmer; Neil Widener; Gavin James; Chris Galletta
- Story by: Allison Schroeder; Chris Bowman; Hubbel Palmer
- Based on: Minecraft by Mojang Studios
- Produced by: Roy Lee; Jon Berg; Mary Parent; Cale Boyter; Jason Momoa; Jill Messick (Note: Messick died in February 2018. She received a posthumous credit and the film is dedicated to her memory.); Torfi Frans Ólafsson; Vu Bui
- Starring: Jason Momoa; Jack Black; Emma Myers; Danielle Brooks; Sebastian Hansen; Jennifer Coolidge
- Cinematography: Enrique Chediak
- Edited by: James Thomas
- Music by: Mark Mothersbaugh (Note: Original Minecraft themes by C418 and Lena Raine)
- Production companies: Warner Bros. Pictures; Legendary Pictures; Vertigo Entertainment; On the Roam; Mojang Studios
- Distributed by: Warner Bros. Pictures
- Release dates: March 30, 2025 (Empire Leicester Square); April 4, 2025 (United States and Sweden)
- Running time: 101 minutes
- Countries: United States; Sweden
- Language: English
- Budget: $150 million
- Box office: $961.2 million

A Minecraft Movie is a 2025 adventure comedy film based on the 2011 video game Minecraft developed and published by Mojang Studios. Directed by Jared Hess, from a screenplay by Chris Bowman, Hubbel Palmer, Neil Widener, Gavin James, and Chris Galletta, based on a story by Allison Schroeder, Bowman, and Palmer, the film stars Jason Momoa (who also serves as one of the producers), Jack Black, Emma Myers, Danielle Brooks, Sebastian Hansen, and Jennifer Coolidge. It follows four misfits from the fictional town of Chuglass, Idaho, who are pulled through a portal into a cubic world, and must embark on a quest back to the real world with the help of an expert named Steve.

Plans for a Minecraft film adaptation originated in 2014, when game creator Markus Persson revealed that Mojang Studios was in talks with Warner Bros. to develop the project. Throughout development, the film shifted between several directors, producers, and story drafts. By 2022, Legendary Entertainment became involved, and Hess was hired as director with Momoa in talks to star. Further casting took place from May 2023 to January 2024. Principal photography began later that month in New Zealand and concluded in April 2024. Mark Mothersbaugh composed the score, and Sony Pictures Imageworks, Wētā FX, and Digital Domain provided the film's visual effects.

A Minecraft Movie premiered in London on March 30, 2025, and was released in the United States and Sweden on April 4, by Warner Bros. Pictures. The film received mixed reviews from critics and was a box-office success, grossing around $961 million and becoming the fifth-highest-grossing film of 2025 and the third-highest-grossing video game film of all time. Additionally, it became a Generation Z phenomenon when it spawned a trend known as the "Chicken Jockey" trend. A sequel, A Minecraft Movie Squared, is scheduled for release on July 23, 2027.

== Plot ==
Struggling doorknob salesman Steve goes to work in a mine to fulfill a childhood dream, where he discovers the Orb of Dominance and the Earth Crystal. When combined, they create a portal that transports him to the Overworld, a world where the terrain is made of easily manipulated cubes. He builds his own city and later stumbles across a portal to a hellish world called the Nether. He is imprisoned by Malgosha, the gold-obsessed piglin ruler of the Nether who gravely discourages creativity and steals Steve's dog, Dennis. Because the Orb would allow her to control the Overworld, Steve has Dennis escape with the Orb and Crystal and hide them under his bed in the real world.

Sometime later, 1980s video game champion Garrett "The Garbage Man" Garrison owns a struggling video game store in Chuglass, Idaho. He attends a storage auction to acquire items to sell for cash, ultimately winning the contents of Steve's old house. While searching through the items, particularly hoping to find an Atari Cosmos, he instead finds the empty box, Steve's old belongings, and the Orb and Crystal, to his anger and confusion.

Siblings Henry and Natalie move to Chuglass following their mother's death. The two meet Dawn, their real estate agent, who also runs a mobile petting zoo. On Henry's first day of school, he gets in trouble when his experimental jetpack is sabotaged and damages the potato chip factory's mascot Chuggy. To avoid expulsion from Vice Principal Marlene, he pays Garrett to play his uncle. At Garrett's video game store, Henry discovers the Orb and Crystal and combines them, leading the two to the mine. Natalie finds out Henry is missing and calls Dawn who tracks down Henry's location via Natalie's phone. As the four reunite, they are sucked into the portal to the Overworld. Meanwhile, Malgosha learns that the Orb has returned and releases Steve from his imprisonment in the Nether to reclaim it, claiming she has Dennis as a hostage.

While fighting off monsters at night, Henry learns to manipulate blocks and builds a dirt fortress. The Earth Crystal is destroyed in the commotion. Steve appears at dawn and defeats the monsters before telling the group that a replacement Crystal will be needed from the Woodland Mansion; he joins them. To prepare for this quest, he leads them to a nearby village and demonstrates how to craft. Piglins seeking the Orb of Dominance launch an attack on the village. Steve, Garrett, and Henry narrowly escape while Natalie and Dawn are separated from them and befriend Dennis. Malgosha responds by sending out the Great Hog, a massive Piglin.

When Steve mentions that he has a hoard of diamonds, Garrett becomes interested and demands access as an added condition to handing over the Orb. They make a detour and find the hoard, but Henry is angered by their disregard for Natalie's safety. When the Great Hog arrives, they escape using minecarts and the Hog is blown up by creepers. Arriving at the mansion, Steve and Garrett attempt to distract the guards while Henry acquires both the Earth Crystal and an Ender Pearl, which can facilitate one's teleportation. Malgosha returns and destroys the bridge to the mansion. Steve and Henry lose the Orb to her, but escape as Garrett seemingly sacrifices himself to fight off Malgosha's forces. The two awaken with Dawn, Natalie, and Dennis in a custom mushroom house.

Malgosha uses the Orb to superpower the Nether portal, blotting out the sun and declaring war on the Overworld. The party crafts an arsenal of weaponry and an army of iron golems to fight the piglin invasion, while Steve fights Malgosha. Henry uses the Ender Pearl to obtain the Orb, restoring the sunlight and causing Malgosha and her army to zombify.

The party, including Garrett who survived the explosion, returns to Chuglass, where they develop the successful video game Block City Battle Buddies. Dawn opens her zoo with Dennis as an attraction, Natalie opens a dojo, Henry completes his jetpack, and Garrett revitalizes the game store with Steve. Steve visits his old house and meets Alex, a woman living there.

== Cast ==
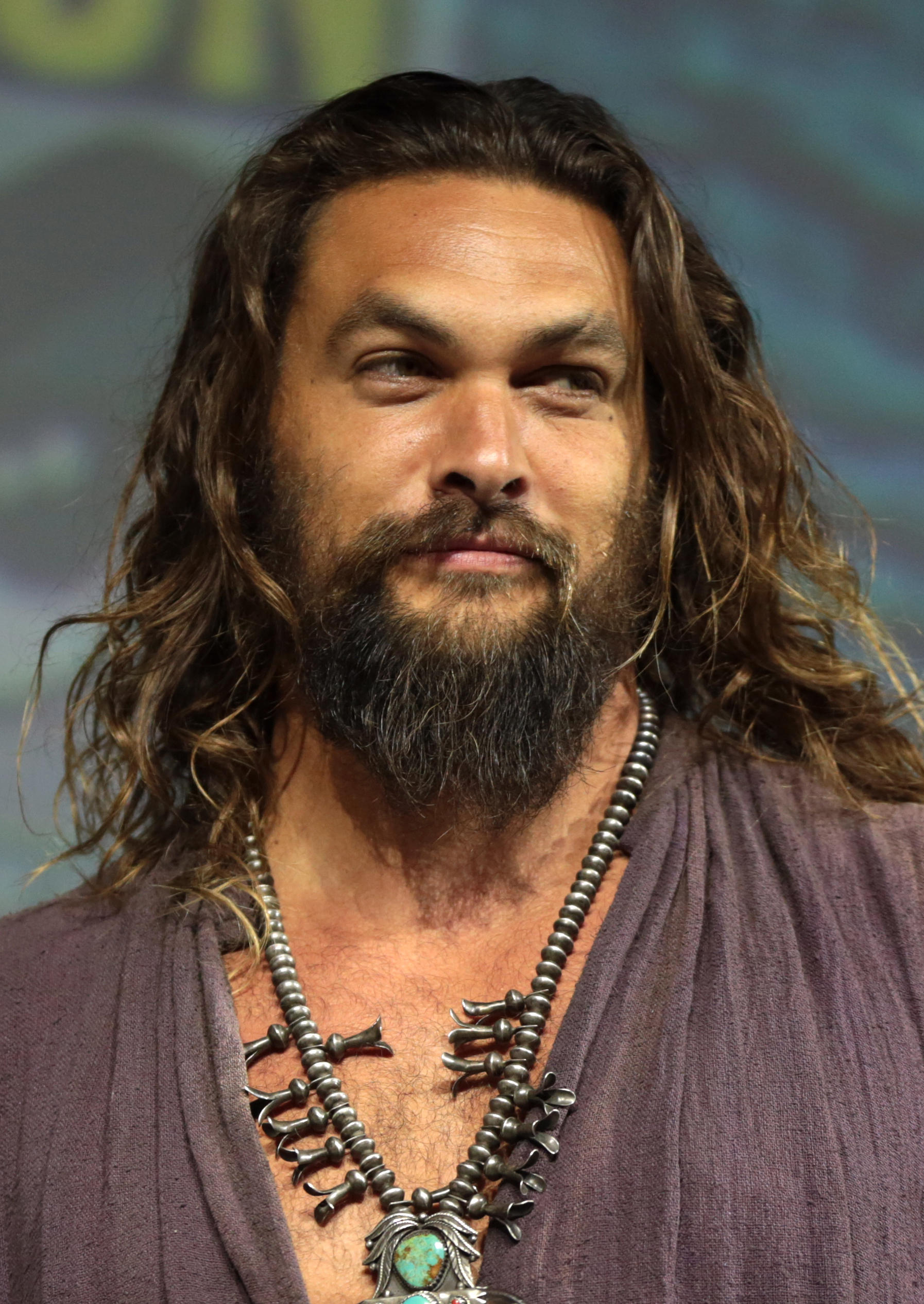
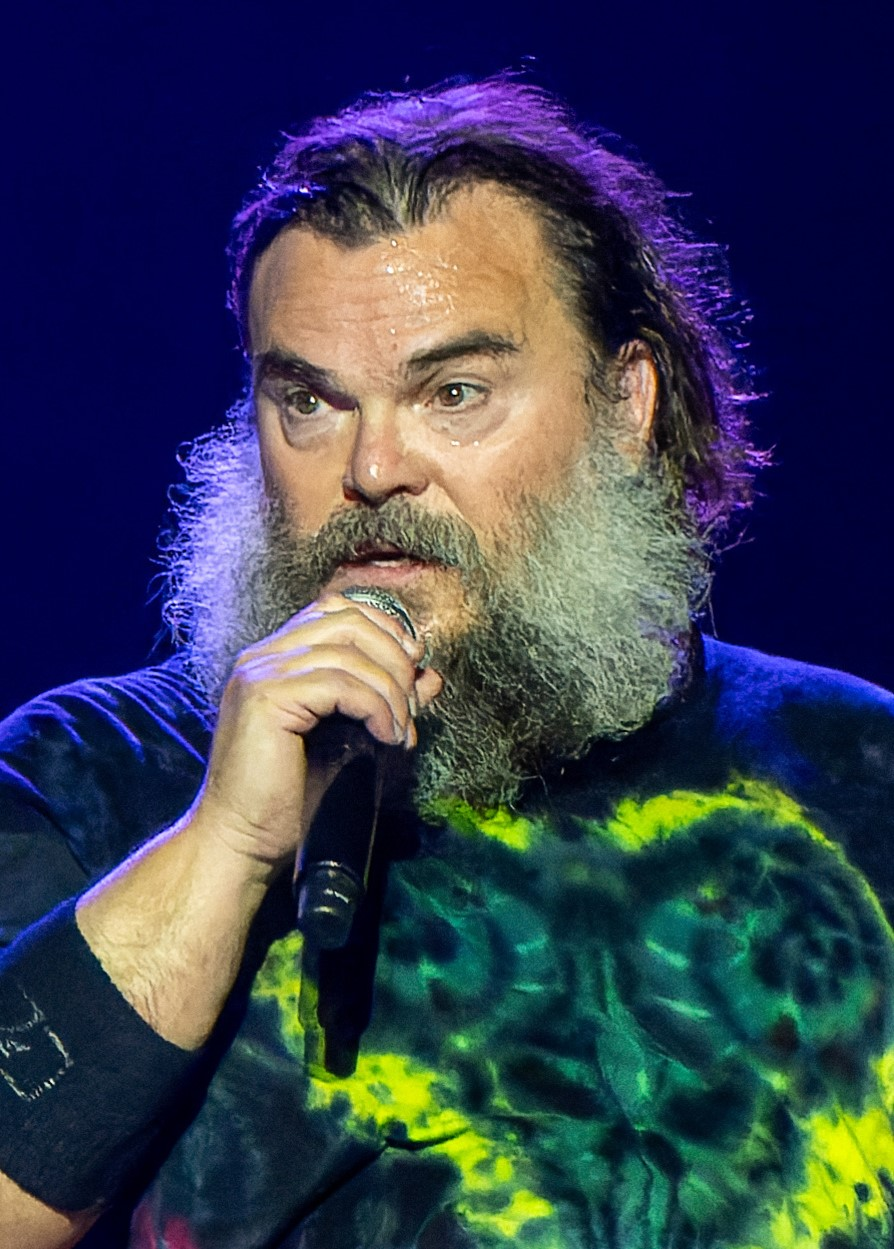
Jason Momoa and Jack Black star in the film.
- Jason Momoa as Garrett "The Garbage Man" Garrison, a struggling video game store owner and former game champion
  - Moana Williams as young Garrett Garrison
- Jack Black as Steve, a former doorknob salesman who has spent years living in the Overworld
  - Bram-Scott Breheny as young Steve
- Emma Myers as Natalie, a caring girl in her early 20s who becomes her brother's legal guardian following their mother's death
- Danielle Brooks as Dawn, a real estate agent who runs a mobile petting zoo
- Sebastian Hansen as Henry, a creative boy and younger brother of Natalie
  - Benjamin Carter serves as Henry's photo double
- Jennifer Coolidge as Marlene, the vice principal of Chuglass High School who has a history of accidentally driving her 2001 Jeep Grand Cherokee into others
- Rachel House as the voice of Malgosha, the piglin ruler of the Nether
  - Allan Henry serves as the motion-capture performer of Malgosha.
- Jemaine Clement as:
  - Daryl, an auctioneer who runs Steve's storage auction
  - The voice of Bruce, a piglin who taunts Malgosha in a flashback
- Jared Hess as the voice of General Chungus, a high-ranking piglin in Malgosha's army
- Matt Berry as the voice of Nitwit, a villager who ends up transported to Earth and becomes Marlene's eventual romantic partner
  - Bret McKenzie serves as the motion-capture performer of Nitwit
- Hiram Garcia as Mr. Gunchie, an art teacher/gym teacher at Chuglass High School who is revealed to be one of Marlene's ex-husbands in a mid-credits scene
- Tommy Broadmore as Trevor, a student who bullies Henry and sabotages his jetpack prototype
- Frankie Creagh-Leslie as the unnamed friend of Trevor

Amanda Billing portrays Natalie and Henry's mother in a photograph. Mark Wright portrays an HR person at Chuglass High School. YouTubers DanTDM, Aphmau, Mumbo Jumbo, and LDShadowLady make cameos as auction attendees. Jens Bergensten, who is one of the lead designers for Minecraft, makes a cameo appearance as a waiter who tends to Marlene and Nitwit. A pig wearing a crown appears as a tribute to YouTuber Technoblade, who died in 2022. Kate McKinnon makes an uncredited vocal cameo in a post-credits scene as Alex, a woman living in Steve's house, with Alice May Connolly physically portraying Alex.

== Production ==
=== Background ===
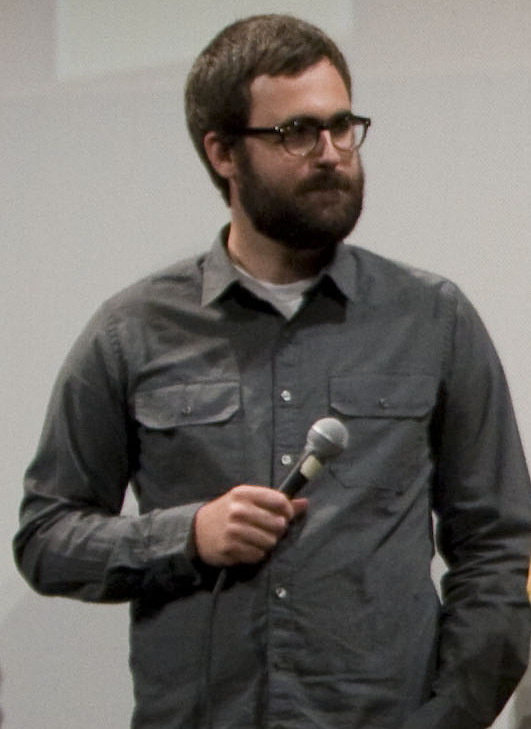
In 2022, Jared Hess came on board to direct the film, which had been in development since 2014.

Following a series of offers from Hollywood producers to create a Minecraft-related television series and a crowdfunding campaign for a fan film that was shut down by Minecraft creator Markus "Notch" Persson, Persson revealed that Mojang Studios was in talks with Warner Bros. to develop an official Minecraft film in February 2014. Later in October, Mojang CCO Vu Bui stated that the movie was early in development, and would be a "large-budget" production. He also said that the film might not be released until at least 2018. Originally, Roy Lee and Jill Messick were set to produce the project. That same month, Warner Bros. hired Shawn Levy to direct the film, though he and writers Kieran and Michele Mulroney, who were developing the film together, left the project by December.

By July 2015, Warner Bros. hired Rob McElhenney to direct the film. He said that he had been drawn to the film based on the open-world nature of the game, an idea Warner Bros. had initially agreed with and for which they had provided him with a preliminary US$150 million budget. Early production started in 2016, and an initial release date was announced for May 24, 2019. Jason Fuchs was set to write the script of the film, and Steve Carell was going to star as the voice of an unknown character. However, by late 2016, McElhenney's Minecraft film "slowly died on the vine", after studio executive Greg Silverman's departure from Warner Bros. in late 2016. Aaron and Adam Nee were tapped to rewrite the script and the film was delayed as a result. No new director was announced at that time. By January 2019, Peter Sollett was announced to write and direct the film, which would feature an entirely different story from McElhenney's version. Messick, who died in 2018, was posthumously credited as producer. The original vision Sollet had for the film involved "a teenage girl and her unlikely group of adventurers" as they set out on a quest to defeat the Ender Dragon, the final boss of the original Minecraft game. The film was later given a new release date of March 4, 2022. In June 2019, Allison Schroeder was hired to write the script and co-write the story with Sollett. Due to the COVID-19 pandemic in 2020, Warner Bros. was forced to adjust its release schedule, which included removing the Minecraft film from its planned release date.

In April 2022, production on the Minecraft film was announced to be moving forward without Sollett and Schroeder, with Jared Hess now set to direct, Legendary Entertainment to co-produce (through its executive Mary Parent), and Jason Momoa in early talks to star. The film was also confirmed to be live action. It was also reported that Chris Bowman and Hubbel Palmer, who collaborated with Hess on Masterminds (2016), would rewrite the script. Producer Roy Lee credited new leadership at Warner Bros. for pushing the film into production after so many years saying: "Toby Emmerich shut it down when he first started, and if he had never run Warner Bros., it would’ve been made years earlier. It was only after Pam [Abdy] and Mike [De Luca] started that they reignited the project and it got made."

=== Development ===
Hess' involvement in the film began after a separate project he was developing with Legendary never materialized, and he was involved by the studio to pitch a take for the Minecraft adaptation. He later stated that he enjoyed trying to "adapt something that doesn't have a story – it's an open sandbox game", and hoped to find an opportunity for a "fun, ridiculous movie". The film's final writing credits went to Chris Bowman, Hubbel Palmer, Neil Widener, Gavin James, and Chris Galletta, who wrote the film from a story by Allison Schroeder, Bowman, and Palmer. Off-screen Additional Literary Material credit was given to Hess, McElhenney, Fuchs, Megan Amram, Kevin Biegel, John Francis Daley, Dana Fox, Hannah Friedman, Jonathan Goldstein, Phil Augusta Jackson, Lauryn Kahn, Kieran Mulroney, Michele Mulroney, Aaron Nee, Adam Nee, Zak Penn, Simon Rich, Peter Sollett, Laura Steinel, Jon Spaihts, Oren Uziel, and Ben Wexler.

While adapting Minecraft into a film, the production crew aimed to make sure that the objects present in the film were faithful to the game, made up only of cubes. This included everything from trees to fruit. Several YouTubers and members of the Minecraft community were present during the production of the film, with YouTuber Mumbo Jumbo contributing towards designing some of the props. When writing and directing the film, the team opted to make a story based on Minecraft, rather than making an official canon story, which they viewed as in-line with Minecraft's nature as a sandbox game that lets players create their own stories. As such, the film was titled A Minecraft Movie, rather than The Minecraft Movie. This concept is also applied to the film's depiction of one of Minecraft's characters, Steve, which the production crew described Jack Black's version as one of many Steves not meant to represent the "Steve" present in Minecraft.

James Thomas served as the film's editor. While A Minecraft Movie is predominantly a live action film, it uses a heavy amount of computer animation to simulate the terrain, animals, monsters, and other objects. Green-screens and in-studio lighting were also used extensively. 3D models were imported into Unreal Engine to create virtual environments of various sets, which were used throughout the production of the film. Visual effects for the film were provided by Sony Pictures Imageworks, Wētā FX, and Digital Domain, with Dan Lemmon serving as visual effects supervisor.

=== Casting ===
Around the same time that Hess was announced to direct the film, it was also stated that Momoa would star in the film. In May 2023, Matt Berry entered negotiations to join the cast, while Danielle Brooks and Sebastian Eugene Hansen joined the cast in November, and Emma Myers joined the cast in December. Jack Black, who previously collaborated with Hess on Nacho Libre in 2006, joined the cast in January 2024, teasing his casting in the film via his official Instagram account. Originally, Berry was supposed to play Steve while Black was set to only appear as a cameo in the form of a talking pig, but due to the 2023 Hollywood labor disputes, Berry had to vacate the role, with Black taking over the role of Steve. According to producer Torfi Frans Olafsson, Black's depiction of Steve was "specific to him". At the same time as Black's casting, Jennifer Coolidge, Kate McKinnon, and Jemaine Clement were also cast in then-undisclosed roles. YouTuber Valkyrae was originally set to appear in the film, but was removed after she openly accused Momoa of mistreating the cast and production crew.

=== Filming ===
Principal photography for the film began in January 2024 in Auckland, New Zealand, and concluded by April of that year. A majority of the scenes set in the fictional town of Chuglass, Idaho were filmed in Huntly, with additional production taking place at Helensville, Auckland Film Studios, and Settlers Country Manor. Originally, filming was going to begin in August 2023, but was delayed due to the 2023 SAG-AFTRA strike. Grant Major served as the production designer, and Enrique Chediak served as the cinematographer.

== Music ==
Mark Mothersbaugh composed the original score, while Gabe Hilfer and Karyn Rachtman serve as music supervisors. Mothersbaugh incorporated "nods" to the music of the game by C418, and said that the score was meant to balance the "charm" of the characters with the action, while retaining a "depth and emotional resonance". From the Minecraft soundtrack, C418's title track plays during the opening credits, and his song "Dragon Fish" plays during a scene with pandas; Lena Raine's track "Pigstep" features during the "Nether's Got Talent" sequence.

The film includes several original songs performed by Black, including "I Feel Alive". It was written by Black, and features Foo Fighters frontman Dave Grohl on drums, Queens of the Stone Age guitarist Troy Van Leeuwen, Jellyfish keyboardist Roger Joseph Manning Jr., and Mark Ronson on both rhythm guitar and bass. Brooks also provides backup vocals. The song was released as a single prior to the release of the film on March 20, 2025. Mothersbaugh's score, along with original songs by Benee, Dayglow, and Dirty Honey, was released digitally on March 28. The film also features an instrumental rendition of Depeche Mode's "Just Can't Get Enough" performed by Jamieson Shaw.

Another song in the film, "Steve's Lava Chicken", went viral online after the film's release and charted in several territories. The song became the shortest song to reach the Top 40 of the UK singles chart, and the Billboard Hot 100 in the United States.

== Marketing ==
The film's first teaser trailer, set to the Beatles's "Magical Mystery Tour", was released on September 4, 2024. Audience reactions to the teaser were noted as "divided" or "generally negative", with criticism for the CGI, design, and live-action nature of the film. Andrew Webster of The Verge said that besides its "unsettling imagery", it "looks like some silly family fun". Tom Power of TechRadar could not decide whether it was "drop-dead gorgeous or the stuff of nightmares". Markus Persson, the creator of Minecraft, praised the trailer on Twitter, saying "Ok i'm in Wow this is a weird feeling." Various clips and images from the trailer, such as the designs of a bleating pink sheep and a white llama, and Jack Black saying "I... am Steve", were ridiculed by online commenters.

A second trailer, set to MGMT's "Time to Pretend", was released on November 19, to a more positive response from many viewers. A final trailer for the film was released on February 27, and a final teaser for the film was released on March 27. A few days before the film's release, a workprint version featuring incomplete visual effects and CGI, missing credits, and significant chroma key masking errors was leaked onto various piracy websites and spread on social media platforms such as Twitter.

Mojang collaborated with various brands to create promotional products for the film, including action figures of the characters, "creeper green" vanilla milk from TruMoo, wallpaper themes for the Samsung Galaxy S25 and Samsung Electronics's smart TVs and smart refrigerators, and special Happy Meals offered by McDonald's. The unusual nature of these products, such as the "uncanny" appearance of the Jack Black action figure, garnered attention and some criticism, though the "Nether Flame Sauce" hot dipping sauce from the McDonald's promotion was lauded for its spice and suitability with Chicken McNuggets.

== Release ==
=== Theatrical ===
A Minecraft Movie had its official premiere at the Leicester Square in London, England, on March 30, 2025, and was released theatrically in IMAX in the United States and Sweden by Warner Bros. Pictures on April 4. (Note: Attributed to multiple sources:)

=== Home media ===
A Minecraft Movie was released for digital download on May 13, 2025, and was released on Ultra HD Blu-ray, Blu-ray, and DVD on June 24. It was released on HBO Max on June 20.

== Reception ==
=== Box office ===
A Minecraft Movie grossed $424.1 million in the United States and Canada and $537.1 million in other territories, for a worldwide total of $961.2 million.

In the United States and Canada, A Minecraft Movie was released alongside Hell of a Summer, and was initially projected to gross $65–70 million from 4,263 theaters in its opening weekend, with some estimates going as high as $80 million. It made an estimated $10.6 million from Thursday night previews, topping Five Nights at Freddy's' $10.3 million for best total by a video game adaptation, and increasing weekend projections to $80–100 million. After making $58 million on its first day (including previews), estimates were again revised to $135–150 million. It ended up debuting with $162.8 million domestically and $313 million globally on its opening weekend, surpassing The Super Mario Bros. Movie domestically, which also featured Black, as the highest-grossing opening weekend for a movie based on a video game.

The film had the third-highest Warner Bros. opening weekend, behind Harry Potter and the Deathly Hallows – Part 2 and Batman v Superman: Dawn of Justice, as well as the company's highest April opening weekend, beating out Clash of the Titans. It also beat out Captain America: Brave New World to achieve the biggest opening weekend of 2025 at the time. Additionally, A Minecraft Movie earned the third-highest April opening weekend, trailing Avengers: Endgame and Avengers: Infinity War, and was the second-highest for a Legendary production, only behind Jurassic World. Overall, it would score the fourth-highest opening weekend for a PG-rated film, after The Lion King, Incredibles 2 and Beauty and the Beast. The movie also marked the highest opening weekend for Jared Hess (surpassing Nacho Libre), Danielle Brooks (surpassing The Angry Birds Movie) and Jennifer Coolidge (surpassing American Pie 2).

In its second weekend, A Minecraft Movie grossed $78.5 million. Within its first seven days of release, it became the first film of 2025 to reach the $200 million mark domestically, replacing Captain America: Brave New World as the market's highest-grossing film of the year. It also became the second-highest-grossing movie based on a video game, surpassing Sonic the Hedgehog 3. In its third weekend, A Minecraft Movie, grossing $40.5 million, would drop to second place after Warner Bros.' new release Sinners grossed $48 million, in what was considered to be an upset; it was the first time one studio had two films gross more than $40 million over the same weekend since 2009.

=== Critical response ===
On the review aggregator website Rotten Tomatoes, 47% of 196 critics' reviews are positive, with an average rating of 5/10. The website's consensus reads: "Ostensibly a film about celebrating creativity, A Minecraft Movie provides a colorful sandbox for Jack Black and Jason Momoa to amusingly romp around in a story curiously constructed from conventional building blocks." Metacritic, which uses a weighted average, assigned the film a score of 45 out of 100, based on 40 critics, indicating "mixed or average" reviews. Audience reactions to the film were more positive in comparison to critics; filmgoers polled by CinemaScore gave the film an average grade of "B+" on an A+ to F scale, while 67% of those surveyed by PostTrak said they would definitely recommend the film. Kids under the age of 12 gave the film an average rating of five out of five stars, while parents gave an average of four and a half out of five stars.

Critics were divided on the film's plot and whether or not A Minecraft Movie was a faithful adaptation of the game, as well as if it made sense to viewers unfamiliar with it. Lovia Gyarkye of The Hollywood Reporter and Jesse Hassenger of IGN both believed that the film's plot was confusing. Gyarkye felt that it struggled to maintain a balance between appeasing the Minecraft fandom and writing a film that made sense to a general audience, and Hassenger said that the film was "conceptually muddy" and "confusingly and erratically presented". Mark Kennedy of the Associated Press believed that the film would likely make no sense to a viewer unfamiliar with the source material, but still believed that it was a faithful adaptation. However, he did highlight the film's featuring of concepts not present within the game itself to enable plot progression. Contrarily, Liz Shannon Miller of Consequence believed that the plot was fully comprehensible to someone unfamiliar with the game. Stephen Thompson of NPR stated that "turning Minecraft into a movie presents a challenge, because the film has a lot of character development to catch up on. But, as The Lego Movie and Barbie have demonstrated, it's possible to get it spectacularly right". Some reviewers viewed the fan service present within the film positively, particularly highlighting the tribute to Technoblade.

The performances of the cast, particularly Black and Momoa, were praised, with many critics viewing them as helping alleviate or distract from problems present within the film's plot. Miller and Jordan Hoffman of Entertainment Weekly both felt that the story was not the main priority of the film and could be ignored in favor of the performance of the actors, the former believing that the film was mainly made with the intent of having fun. However, some viewed that the characters, despite the performances of their actors, were generally underdeveloped. The sub-plot involving Coolidge's character dating a villager, while viewed as generally unnecessary or relatively thin in terms of character development, was subject to some praise as well.

Some reviewers questioned the purpose or value of the film, with some viewing it as nothing more than a product with the intent of promoting Minecraft. Both Kevin Maher of The Times and David Fear of Rolling Stone likened the film to a corporate cash-grab, viewing it as existing with the sole purpose of promoting the Minecraft brand and offering nothing else of value. Maher further viewed the film as lacking a level of versatility present in other video game adaptations, while Fear believed that the film was intentionally confusing so that it would stay in the minds of people longer, and therefore encourage them to purchase merchandise. While Clarisse Loughrey of The Independent believed that the idea behind a live-action Minecraft adaptation was fundamentally flawed and destroyed the spirit of the source material, she felt that the film had "genuine intent" and was not like other adaptations that she viewed as existing solely for the sake of profit.

=== "Chicken jockey" trend ===
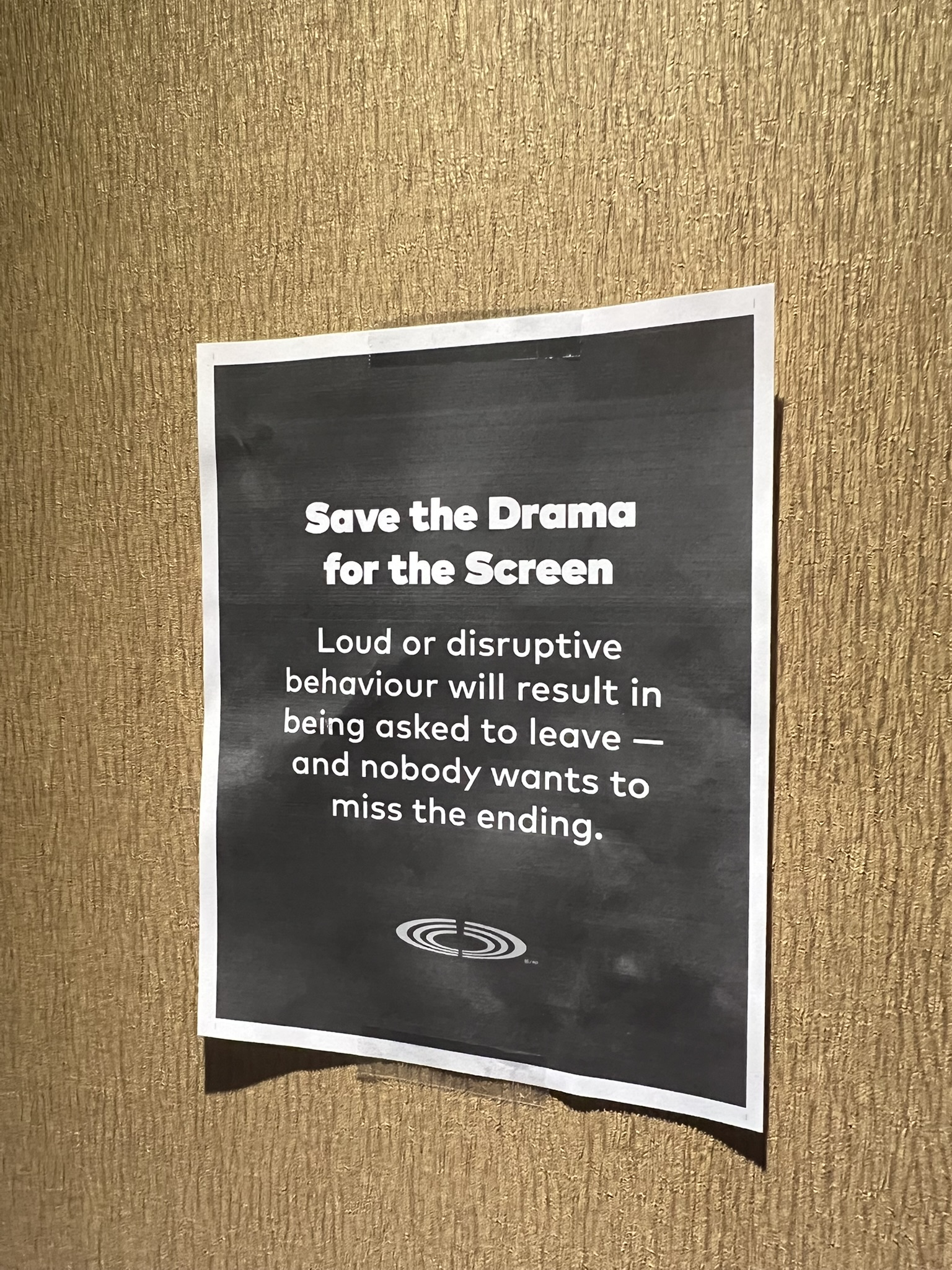
A poster outside a Etobicoke, Toronto, Ontario Cineplex screening of A Minecraft Movie in April 2025 warning theatergoers that disruptive behavior will result in expulsion, as a result of the "chicken jockey" trend

The film sparked boisterous reactions and disorderly conduct from viewers, particularly Generation Z American and British adolescent boys, with some partaking in a viral Internet phenomenon on TikTok, alongside other social media platforms. Participants would often react enthusiastically to moments in the film that have been the subject of Internet memes, such as spontaneously erupting into loud cheers, jumping in excitement, dancing, or throwing popcorn when Steve exclaims "Chicken jockey!" Other viral lines include "Flint and steel!" and "I... am Steve." In one screening, viral videos emerged documenting audience members hoisting a live chicken after the quote and being promptly ejected from the theater at Provo Towne Centre in Provo, Utah; another involved a group setting off fire extinguishers and smoke bombs, suffocating fellow theatergoers; while another led to a violent altercation in the parking lot outside the theater after adults asked four teenagers to quiet down. The trend had also spread to other Gen Z teenage boys from Australia and South Africa.

Reactions to the phenomenon were mixed. Some audience members frowned upon the misconduct as "annoying and disruptive", while several theater chains posted warnings against unruly behavior. Police were reportedly called to restore order and eject offenders, including an instance where an employee was physically harmed, although no charges were filed. Hess defended some of these antics as harmless and amusing, further explaining that he and Black had conceived the scene because they "thought it would be funny if Steve announced everything that happens to him, stating the obvious with extreme intensity". Black made a surprise appearance at a screening and warned fans not to throw popcorn. Writing for The Observer, Kate Maltby opined that audiences had crossed the line, pointing to the mess left for janitors to clean up.

Many observers noted that the trend was evolving into a distinct cultural phenomenon, particularly emphasizing the immersive and communal nature of the theater experience. Research psychologist Rachel Kowert commented, "While being quiet is generally the norm in traditional theater settings, it's important to recognize that different fan cultures come with their own expectations for how to engage." She added, "In this case, the energy surrounding the Minecraft movie reflects a deeply engaged fandom—one that is enthusiastic about sharing the experience in a communal setting." Others argued that the trend reflected youth culture rather than incivility, akin to concerts or sporting events. Warner Bros. released a special "Block Party Edition" of the film on May 2, 2025, in which fans were encouraged to "sing-along and meme-along" viral moments in the film; in the United Kingdom, the cinema chain Cineworld hosted a similar event dubbed "Chicken jockey screenings" in which fans were encouraged to cosplay and make noises, a move praised for its ingenuity by Vulture's Nicholas Quah.

The phenomenon is compared to audience participation at screenings of The Rocky Horror Picture Show (1975) and The Room (2003), as well as the "Gentleminions" TikTok trend surrounding Minions: The Rise of Gru (2022) that similarly involved adolescent boys engaging in outlandish behavior. It has been cited as one of the factors for the film's box-office success.

=== Accolades ===
Accolades received by A Minecraft Movie
Award	Date of Ceremony	Category	Recipient(s)	Result	Ref.
Nickelodeon Kids' Choice Awards	June 21, 2025	Favorite Movie	A Minecraft Movie	Nominated	
Nickelodeon Kids' Choice Awards	June 21, 2025	Favorite Movie Actor	Jack Black	Won	
Nickelodeon Kids' Choice Awards	June 21, 2025	Favorite Movie Actor	Jason Momoa	Nominated	
Nickelodeon Kids' Choice Awards	June 21, 2025	Favorite Movie Actress	Emma Myers	Nominated	
Nickelodeon Kids' Choice Awards	June 21, 2025	Favorite Butt-Kicker	Jack Black	Nominated	
Nickelodeon Kids' Choice Awards	June 21, 2025	Favorite Butt-Kicker	Emma Myers	Won	
Nickelodeon Kids' Choice Awards	June 21, 2025	Favorite Song from a Movie	"I Feel Alive" – Jack Black	Nominated	
Golden Joystick Awards	November 20, 2025	Best Game Adaptation	A Minecraft Movie	Nominated	
The Game Awards	December 11, 2025	Best Adaptation	A Minecraft Movie	Nominated	
Annie Awards	February 21, 2026	Character Animation in a Live Action Production	Kevin Estey, Anthony McIndoe, Jade Lorier, Caroline Ting, and Luisma Lavin Peredo	Nominated	
Visual Effects Society Awards	February 25, 2026	Outstanding Character in a Photoreal Feature	Kevin Estey, Fabio Leporelli, Matteo Stirati, Nick Grace (For "Queen Malgosha")	Nominated	
Saturn Awards	March 8, 2026	Best Cinematic Adaptation	A Minecraft Movie	Nominated	

== Sequel ==
Talks for a potential sequel to the film began a few days after the film's release on April 4, 2025. Hess has expressed interest in making a sequel, noting the world's use of infinite mods, characters, and biomes, outlining how Minecraft is virtually endless. He later stated that there were many ideas they had for the film that they were unable to use, but would likely be included as part of a sequel. On April 11, 2025, it was reported that a sequel is in early development. At the end of a behind the scenes interview, the VFX supervisor Sheldon Stopsack and the animation supervisor Kevin Estey both refer to the film's sequel as Another Minecraft Movie. On October 9, a sequel was announced with a release date of July 23, 2027, with Hess returning to direct and Galletta returning to co-write the screenplay. Legendary Pictures will return to produce and provide funding. A poster with an image of two pickaxes under a crafting table, with the text below saying July 23, 2027, was posted on the film's official Twitter account, and circulated around the official Minecraft and Warner Bros. social media accounts. On March 19, 2026, it was announced that Kirsten Dunst was cast in the role of Alex. The sequel was announced under the title A Minecraft Sequel on April 15, 2026. It was later given an official title, A Minecraft Movie Squared, on May 30, 2026, during Minecraft Live.

== See also ==
- List of films based on video games
