= Heart of Stone (2023 film) =

American film by Tom Harper

- Release poster
- Directed by: Tom Harper
- Screenplay by: Greg Rucka; Allison Schroeder
- Story by: Greg Rucka
- Produced by: David Ellison; Dana Goldberg; Don Granger; Gal Gadot; Jaron Varsano; Bonnie Curtis; Julie Lynn
- Starring: Gal Gadot; Jamie Dornan; Alia Bhatt; Sophie Okonedo; Matthias Schweighöfer
- Cinematography: George Steel
- Edited by: Mark Eckersley
- Music by: Steven Price
- Production companies: Skydance; Pilot Wave; Mockingbird Pictures
- Distributed by: Netflix
- Release date: August 11, 2023
- Running time: 122 minutes
- Country: United States
- Language: English
- Budget: $150 million

Heart of Stone is a 2023 American spy action thriller film directed by Tom Harper from a screenplay by Greg Rucka and Allison Schroeder and a story by Rucka. The film stars Gal Gadot, Jamie Dornan, Alia Bhatt (in her American film debut), Sophie Okonedo, and Matthias Schweighöfer. It follows Rachel Stone, a global intelligence operative embarking on a dangerous mission to protect a mysterious AI system known as "The Heart". She is tasked by the peacekeeping operation known as Charter to keep the object safe from falling into enemy hands.

Development began in December 2020, when Gadot signed on to star. Harper and Netflix were confirmed to serve as director and distributor respectively the following month, with the rest of the cast being confirmed in early 2022. Filming took place in Europe from January to July of that year. With a reported production budget of $150 million, it is one of Netflix's most expensive original films.

Heart of Stone was released on August 11, 2023, by Netflix. The film received mixed reviews from critics and emerged as Netflix's second-most-watched film in the second half of 2023 with nearly 110 million views.

== Plot ==
A team of MI6 field agents named Parker, Yang, and Bailey, supported by technician Rachel Stone, are tasked with extracting an arms dealer named Mulvaney from a ski resort and casino in the Italian Alps. Mulvaney is gambling on a US Navy SEAL combat operation somehow being livestreamed. When Yang is caught trying to sedate Mulvaney, a gunfight breaks out. Parker gets Mulvaney to a cable car while the team heads descends the mountain to confront Mulvaney's security. Stone, working undercover, feigns injury to stay behind and contact a mysterious agent named Jack. Mulvaney dies an apparent suicide.

Stone's superior on Longon, Nomad, reprimands her upon her return for almost blowing her cover. Stone identifies a hacker she saw in the Alps as Keya Dhawan, an orphan with links to Indian criminal syndicates. Stone's organization, "the Charter", leaks MI6 Keya's location and sends them to track her down. They're ambushed by a squad of mercenaries and Jack orders Stone to evacuate. She refuses, saving the team while blowing her cover. Stone reveals to them she is a Charter agent.

Parker murders Yang and Bailey, revealing himself as a double agent working with Keya. He admits to covertly murdering Mulvaney as part of his mission to find The Heart, a quantum computer that guides the Charter's missions. Parker paralyzes Stone with poison before planting a trojan horse device inside her to infiltrate Charter systems. Stone is taken to Charter HQ, and attempts to remove the device when it begins transmitting, but not before the hackers learn the Heart's location.

Nomad suspends Stone and meets with the other 3 "Kings" running the charter. They reveal Parker was an MI6 agent deliberately left for dead during a botched Charter operation in Chechnya 8 years prior. Parker and Keya learned from the hack that The Heart's command system is located in an airship over West Africa, then fly to it. Stone intercepts them, but can't stop them from seizing The Heart and destroying the ship. She cuts the rope ladder to their helicopter and parachutes into the desert with Keya who explains she biometrically encrypted the Heart, making it useless without her. A jeep takes them to a village in Senegal, where Keya is captured by Parker. Stone is rescued by another Charter operative and goes to Iceland where Parker is using a supercomputer to exploit the Heart. He uses it to kill the three other Charter Kings and several operatives, and trap the Charter in their bunker without air.

Keya, who intended the Heart be used only for financial gain, turns on Parker, helps Stone avoid a boobytrap, and reroutes her to Parker and the Heart's true location. Parker tries to force Keya to unencrypt the Heart. Stone kills Parker and Keya uses the Heart to restore oxygen to the Charter's bunker. A month later, Stone visits Keya in prison and she accepts a job in the Charter, joining Stone and Jack for a new mission.

== Cast ==
- Gal Gadot as Rachel "Nine of Hearts" Stone
- Jamie Dornan as Parker
- Sophie Okonedo as Nomad / "King of Hearts"
- Matthias Schweighöfer as "Jack of Hearts"
- Paul Ready as Bailey
- Jing Lusi as Yang
- BD Wong as "King of Clubs"
- Alia Bhatt as Keya Dhawan
- Archie Madekwe as Ivo
- Enzo Cilenti as Mulvaney
- Jon Kortajarena as the Blond
- Glenn Close as "King of Diamonds"
- Mark Ivanir as "King of Spades"

== Production ==
It was announced in December 2020 that Gal Gadot had signed on to star in the film, which is planned to be the beginning of a franchise in a similar vein to the Mission: Impossible franchise. Tom Harper was in negotiations to direct. The story was conceived by Greg Rucka, and the script was written by him and Allison Schroeder. Harper was confirmed in January 2021, with Netflix acquiring the distribution rights to the film. In February 2022, Jamie Dornan was cast to star alongside Gadot. In March, Alia Bhatt, Sophie Okonedo, Matthias Schweighöfer, Jing Lusi and Paul Ready were added to the cast. The film also marks Bhatt's Hollywood debut. With a reported production budget of $150 million, it is among one of Netflix's most expensive films.

Principal photography began in the Alpin Arena Schnals (South Tyrol) on January 26, 2022, following in London on March 8, 2022. The second schedule of filming then took place in Reykjavík, Iceland the following month, after which production moved back to London in May, for the succeeding schedule. The fourth schedule took place in Lisbon, Portugal. Filming wrapped on July 28, 2022.

== Release ==
Heart of Stone was released by Netflix on August 11, 2023.

== Reception ==
=== Viewership ===
Heart of Stone was the most-streamed film on Netflix's English-language list during its first two days of release, with 33.1 million views. For the week ending August 20, it remained the most-streamed film on Netflix's English-language movie chart, with 35.2 million views, and ranked first in 91 countries. For the week ending August 27, the film ranked second overall and on the English-language movie chart with 13.6 million views, bringing its total views to 81.9 million after three weeks of release.

Overall, Heart of Stone was the second most-streamed film on Netflix during the second half of 2023, with 109.6 million views.

=== Critical reception ===
On the review aggregator website Rotten Tomatoes, 30% of 135 critics' reviews are positive, with an average rating of 4.9/10. The website's consensus reads: "Gal Gadot remains an entertaining action star, but she's no match for Heart of Stone's thinly written characters, generic plot, and rote set pieces." Metacritic, which uses a weighted average, assigned the film a score of 44 out of 100, based on 36 critics, indicating "mixed or average" reviews.

Time's Stephanie Zacharek said the film "occupies that vast middle zone of small-screen movies that easily fill the void of a few empty hours, if you happen to have any to spare, though it's nothing you'd carve out time in your schedule to watch." Brian Lowry of CNN said it "capitalizes on Gadot's inherent likability – a ruthless agent burdened by, yes, a heart – without bringing enough distinctive elements to this exercise to make it feel like much more than a Mission wannabe." The Independent's Clarisse Loughrey gave it two out of five stars, writing, "Heart of Stone is an ideological mess. AI is great until it's not, and then it's fine because Gal Gadot can just kick someone in the face. It's conflicted without embracing that conflict, resulting in a film that's really about nothing at all."

Wendy Ide of The Observer gave it three out of five stars, calling the screenplay "a rudimentary thing – scaffolding to support the set pieces – that starts to creak whenever it attempts any depth of character", but praising the action as "terrific, with a screaming, tyre-shredding extended car chase around Lisbon's tight, cobbled alleys a breathless and exhilarating highlight." Richard Roeper of the Chicago Sun-Times gave it three out of four stars, writing, "Heart of Stone is clearly intended to jump-start an action franchise for Gadot, and it's off to a promising start."

==== Year-end lists ====
Heart of Stone appeared on the "Worst Films of 2023" lists: in Variety's year-end list, critic Owen Gleiberman ranked Heart of Stone as the 5th worst film of the year. His review pointed to weak storytelling and lackluster performances, highlighting how the film missed the mark in an increasingly competitive genre. Irish critics Donald Clarke and Tara Brady from The Irish Times placed the film at 9th on their "Worst of the Year" list, adding their voices to the growing disappointment from both American and European reviewers. Their critique echoed sentiments that the movie failed to stand out despite its high-stakes narrative and action sequences. At ScreenCrush, Matt Singer ranked Heart of Stone in 6th place, indicating his disapproval of its predictable plot and formulaic approach. Marlow Stern from Rolling Stone placed it in the 8th spot, further reflecting the film's overall failure to resonate with audiences and critics alike.

Other reviewers, such as Chris Evangelista from /Film, Dominic Griffin from Baltimore Beat, and Meghan Cook from Insider, included the film on their lists as well, cementing Heart of Stone as one of the year's most criticized releases. Their shared criticisms point to an overall consensus that the film did not meet the expectations set by its promotional hype, ultimately making it a major disappointment for 2023.

=== Accolades ===
Heart of Stone was one of the films that received the ReFrame Stamp for the years 2023 to 2024. The stamp is awarded by the gender equity coalition ReFrame and industry database IMDbPro for film and television projects that are proven to have gender-balanced hiring, with stamps being awarded to projects that hire female-identifying people, especially women of color, in four out of eight key roles for their production.

Year	Award	Category	Nominee(s)	Result	Ref.
2024	Jupiter Awards	Best International Actress	Gal Gadot	Nominated	
2024	People's Choice Awards	Action Movie Star of the Year	Gal Gadot	Nominated	
2024	Taurus World Stunt Awards	Best Overall Stunt by a Stunt Woman	Hannah Betts, Karen Lewis	Won	
2024	Taurus World Stunt Awards	Best Overall Stunt by a Stunt Woman	Nellie Burroughes	Nominated	
2024	Taurus World Stunt Awards	Best Speciality Stunt	Craig O'Brien, Karen Lewis, Hannah Betts	Nominated	
2024	Taurus World Stunt Awards	Best High Work	Craig O'Brien, Hannah Betts, Karen Lewis	Won	

== Future ==
Netflix has not officially announced a sequel, although director Tom Harper told Entertainment Weekly that he hoped Heart of Stone would be the first of several films. He stated, "There's plenty that I'd like to explore more with Rachel [Gadot's character] in that regard. There's plenty of rich territory with Rachel, with the Heart, with the Charter. Ultimately we have to see how well it does and see how people like it, but I'm excited about it."
