= The Kings of Summer =

- Theatrical release poster
- Directed by: Jordan Vogt-Roberts
- Written by: Chris Galletta
- Produced by: Tyler Davidson; Peter Saraf; John Hodges
- Starring: Nick Robinson; Gabriel Basso; Moisés Arias; Mary Lynn Rajskub; Erin Moriarty; Marc Evan Jackson; Megan Mullally; Alison Brie; Nick Offerman
- Cinematography: Ross Riege
- Edited by: Terel Gibson
- Music by: Ryan Miller
- Production companies: Low Spark Films; Big Beach Films
- Distributed by: CBS Films
- Release dates: January 19, 2013 (Sundance); May 31, 2013 (United States)
- Running time: 96 minutes
- Country: United States
- Language: English
- Budget: $1.5 million
- Box office: $1.4 million

The Kings of Summer is a 2013 American independent coming-of-age comedy-drama film directed by Jordan Vogt-Roberts and starring Nick Robinson, Moisés Arias, Gabriel Basso, and Nick Offerman. The film premiered under its original title Toy's House on January 19, 2013, at the Sundance Film Festival and was given a limited release on May 31, 2013, by CBS Films.

== Plot ==
Joe Toy, on the verge of adulthood, finds himself increasingly frustrated by the attempts of his single father, Frank, to manage his life. After a family game night ends with Joe calling the cops on Frank for false reasons, he declares freedom once and for all. He escapes to a clearing he found in the woods, along with his best friend, Patrick, also sick of his life at home with his annoying parents, and a strange kid named Biaggio who just happened to tag along.

Joe announces that they are going to build a house in the clearing, free from responsibility and parents. Once their makeshift home is finished, Joe declares himself and Biaggio to be the hunters, while Patrick gathers fruit. Several weeks pass and Patrick and Joe are reported missing and appear on multiple news channels. Frank finds a Monopoly piece from the game night in Joe's bookbag that was left on a bus, and believes that Joe is taunting him.

Conflict arises between Patrick and Joe when Joe invites his crush Kelly to come see the house they built. After a while, she takes a liking to Patrick and they begin a relationship. Joe passively confronts Patrick in a Monopoly game by teaming up with Biaggio, and the two get into a scuffle. Joe calls Kelly a "cancer" and a "bitch" who ruined the peace and harmony the three of them had, and she walks out of the house in despair. Joe, realizing that Patrick feels bad for Kelly, taunts him to go after her and stomps on his previously broken foot. Patrick leaves to find Kelly, and comforts her with a kiss. Biaggio, who has become good friends with Joe, is told to leave as well, leaving Joe to live alone.

About a month later, Joe is still living alone in the woods. Biaggio asks his father, who is shaving, if you go to Hell for leaving your friend, to which his father replies "Of course." Kelly goes to a concerned Frank and offers to take him to Joe. Short on money, Joe sets out to hunt his own food, eventually leading him to kill and eat a rabbit. A snake is attracted to the house after he does not dispose of the body properly. When Kelly and Frank arrive, they find him cornered by the venomous snake. Biaggio comes barging in the makeshift house and attempts to kill the snake with his machete, but is bitten on the ankle instead and collapses, becoming violently ill. Frank, Kelly, and a mildly feral Joe rush Biaggio to the hospital. Joe and Frank reconcile. Biaggio survives and tells Joe that he saw heaven, and if he had to do it all over again, he would; but then he changes his mind.

Joe and Patrick's parents each drive them home. As they view each other from their respective cars, they flip each other off jokingly and part ways. The film ends on shots of the house Joe, Patrick, and Biaggio built.

After the credits, Biaggio is seen once again residing in the house in the woods.

== Cast ==
- Nick Robinson as Joe Toy
- Gabriel Basso as Patrick Keenan
- Moisés Arias as Biaggio
- Nick Offerman as Frank Toy
- Erin Moriarty as Kelly
- Alison Brie as Heather Toy
- Megan Mullally as Mrs. Keenan
- Marc Evan Jackson as Mr. Keenan
- Eugene Cordero as Colin
- Gillian Vigman as Carol
- Mary Lynn Rajskub as Captain Davis
- Thomas Middleditch as Rookie Cop
- Nathan Keyes as Paul
- Angela Trimbur as Face Paint
- Kumail Nanjiani as Gary the Delivery Guy
- Austin Abrams as Aaron
- Craig Cackowski as Mr. Larson
- Lili Reinhart as Vicki
- Cristoffer Carter as Construction Kid
- Hannibal Buress as Bus Driver
- Tony Hale as Bus Passenger

== Production ==
The screenplay by Chris Galletta, originally titled Toy's House, appeared in the 2009 edition of The Black List, an annual survey of the most popular unfilmed scripts amongst studio and production executives. The film was director Vogt-Roberts' first feature film and was screenwriter Galletta's first produced script. Filming took place in the summer of 2012 in various locations across Ohio, including Cleveland, Chagrin Falls, Lyndhurst and South Pointe Hospital in Warrensville.

== Music ==
The soundtrack consists of music created by Ryan Miller. Other songs in the movie are MGMT's "The Youth", Youth Lagoon's "17", and other indie/alternative songs.

== Release ==
The film had its world premiere on January 19, 2013, during the 2013 Sundance Film Festival as Toy's House. Shortly after, it was announced CBS Films had acquired distribution rights to the film. The title of the film was later changed to The Kings of Summer. It was shown at the Cleveland International Film Festival on April 3, 2013. The film was originally scheduled for a June 14, 2013, release date, however, it was moved up to May 31. It received a limited release, and expanded to more theaters over the next few weeks.

== Reception ==
On Rotten Tomatoes, the film holds an approval rating of 76% based on 117 reviews, with an average rating of 6.91/10. The site's critical consensus reads, "Thanks to charming performances and endearingly off-kilter spirit, The Kings of Summer proves to be a slight, sweet entry in the crowded coming-of-age genre." On Metacritic, the film has a weighted average score of 61 out of 100, based on 33 critics, indicating "generally favorable reviews".

Sheila O'Malley of the Chicago Tribune wrote, "despite some beautiful sequences and solid acting, the script by first-timer Chris Galletta pulls its punches, over-explains the emotional meaning of its moments, and tries to lighten the mood in sometimes awkward sit-com-style ways, betraying the movie's more honest spirit. The Kings of Summer flirts with profundity, seeming to yearn for it and fear the honest expression of it at the same time. There is much here to admire, but the overall impression is of a film that does not have the courage of its convictions."

Upon the film's August 2013 UK release, Mike McCahill of The Guardian said "If David Gordon Green had made Son of Rambow, it might have looked something like this: a sunny and reasonably funny coming-of-ager"; he concluded "The director's background in online shorts manifests itself in an occasional, montage-heavy scattiness, and the broadly conventional closing act can't quite maintain the laugh rate, but there's a lot of warm-hearted and commendably daft business along the way."
