= Chris Galletta =

American screenwriter (born 1981)

- Born: 1981 (age 44–45); Tottenville, Staten Island, New York, US
- Education: St. John's University
- Occupation: Screenwriter

Chris Galletta (born 1981) is an American screenwriter. He is best known for writing the 2013 coming-of-age film The Kings of Summer, and the 2025 video game film A Minecraft Movie.

== Early life ==
Galletta, who comes from an Italian background, grew up in Tottenville, Staten Island, New York, where he attended Tottenville High School. He graduated from the St. John's University College of Professional Studies; his major was in television and film studies. He later attended the Columbia University School of the Arts and graduated with a Master of Fine Arts in 2010.

== Career ==
Galletta first worked in the entertainment industry on the Late Show with David Letterman where he was an intern. He worked on Letterman as a contributing writer for several years before he left to pursue writing film screenplays full-time.

Galletta's first screenplay, Toy's House, was written as the thesis of his degree at Columbia University. In 2009, the script made the Black List, a survey of the best unproduced film screenplays, and was purchased by Big Beach Films the same week that the list was published, before Galletta had graduated from Columbia. The film was directed by Jordan Vogt-Roberts and renamed The Kings of Summer. It premiered at the 2013 Sundance Film Festival to positive reviews. Elements of the screenplay are based on Galletta's experiences as a youth living on Staten Island, but the producers of the film changed the location to Chagrin Falls, Ohio, a move that Galletta endorsed for giving the story "an 'any town' type of feel".

Galletta has also managed to sell a pitch for a screenplay to New Line Cinema, which he described as "an action comedy set in Rio de Janeiro". The story was co-written with Todd Strauss-Schulson, who is also slated to direct the film, although Galletta was hired to write the script individually.
