= Chris Tebbetts =

American writer

Chris Tebbetts is an author who grew up in Yellow Springs, Ohio. He currently lives in Vermont. He is known for co-authoring the Middle School series with James Patterson.

== Bibliography ==
- Me Myself & Him (2019)
- M or F? with Lisa Papademetriou (2005)
- Middle School: The Worst Years of My Life with James Patterson and Laura Park (2011)
- Middle School: Get Me Out of Here with James Patterson and Laura Park (2012)
- Middle School: How I Survived Bullies, Broccoli, and Snake Hill
- Middle School: Save Rafe! with James Patterson
- Middle School: Hero to Zero with James Patterson
- Middle School: Just My Rotten Luck with James Patterson
- Middle School: Master of Disaster with James Patterson
- Public School Superhero with James Patterson
- Stranded with Jeff Probst
- Stranded: Trial By Fire with Jeff Probst
- Stranded: Survivors with Jeff Probst
- Stranded Shadow Island: Forbidden Passage with Jeff Probst
- Stranded Shadow Island: The Sabotage with Jeff Probst
- Stranded Shadow Island: Desperate Measures with Jeff Probst
- The Viking, Saga One: Viking Pride
- The Viking, Saga Two: Quest for Faith
- The Viking, Saga Three: Land of the Dead
- The Viking, Saga Four: Hammer of the Gods
