= Waimauku Dairy Factory =

Historic property in Waimauku

Coordinates: 36°45′52″S 174°29′31″E

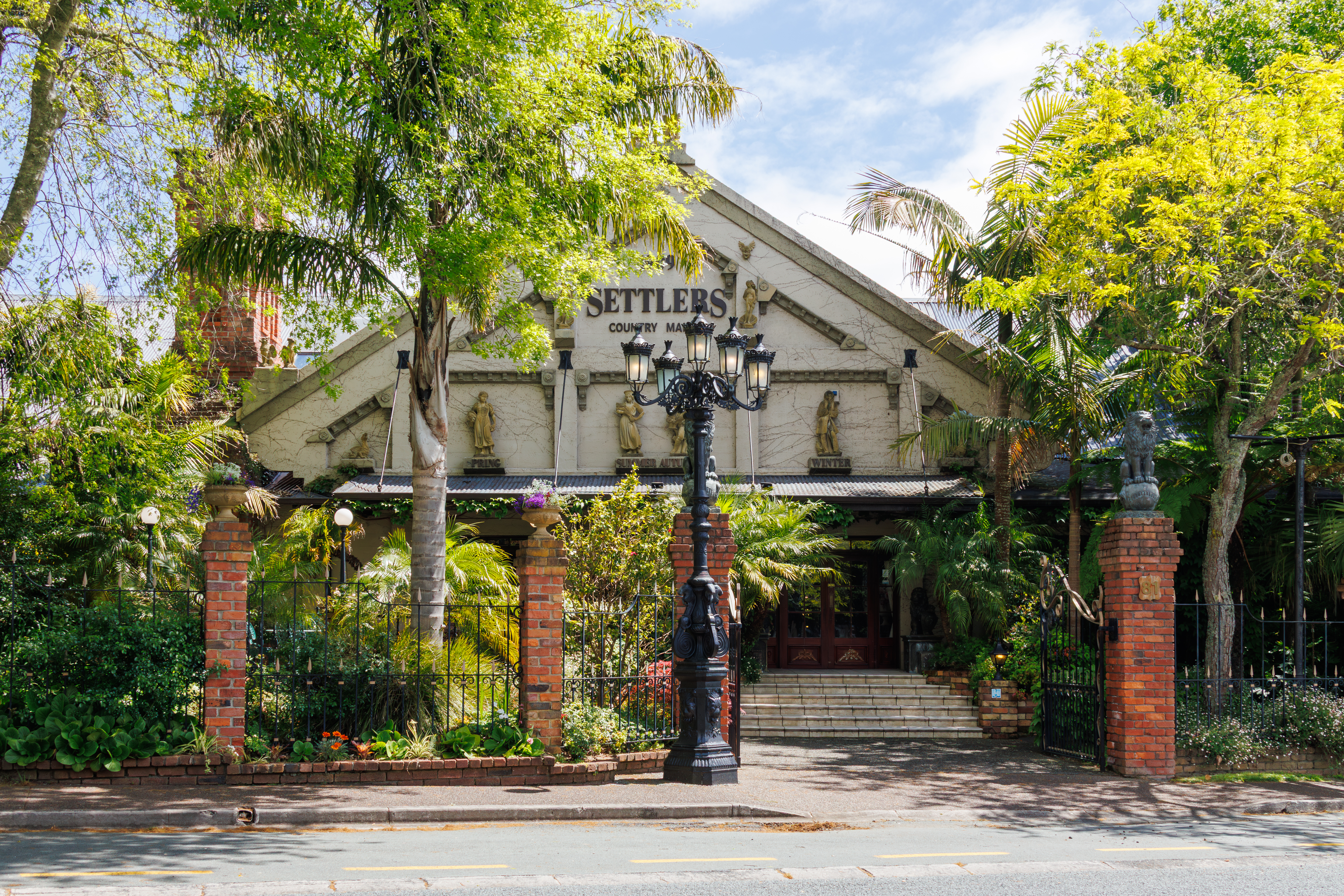
- Interactive map of the Waimauku Dairy Factory area

General information
- Location: 81 Waimauku Station Road, Waimauku
- Opened: November 1915

Website
- www.settlerscountrymanor.co.nz

The Waimauku Dairy Factory, operated under the Settlers Country Manor name, is a historic property in Waimauku, New Zealand. It has been used as a wedding venue and as a venue for opera performance and films, including the 2025 film A Minecraft Movie.

The site was associated with the Waitemata Co-operative Dairy Company in the late 19th century. In 1909, it was formally established as a dairy factory. The original factory building was opened in October 1915, and a larger building was opened in November 1924. According to NZHistory, the enlarged dairy factory opened on 27 November 1924 and was built to service approximately 350 local dairy suppliers. The property was renovated in 1972 for event and destination use. The site is listed as a place of historic heritage value under Schedule 14.1 (Schedule of Historic Heritage) of the Auckland Council’s Unitary Plan.

The venue has hosted weddings for public figures, including the 2025 wedding of Shortland Street actress Charisse Uy, which was held at the property operating as Settlers Country Manor.

In 2025, Settlers Country Manor won the Wedding Venue - Garden Award at the New Zealand Wedding Industry Awards.
