= Brent Almond =

American film producer

Brent Almond (born March 3, 1983) is an American film producer. He has recently been nominated for a Grammy for best Music Film for I'll Sleep When I'm Dead.

== Career ==
In 2016, Almond produced the comedy Masterminds; a heist movie starring Zach Galifianakis, Kristen Wiig, Owen Wilson and Jason Sudeikis.

== Filmography (as a producer) ==
=== Film ===
2008	Dan's Detour of Life	Executive Producer	
2008	The Acquirer	Executive Producer	
2016	Fallen	Executive Producer	
2016	The First Monday in May	Producer	
2016	I'll Sleep When I'm Dead	Producer	Nominated for Best Music Film at the 59th Grammy Awards
2016	Masterminds	Executive Producer	
2016	High Noon	Executive Producer	
2017	Kidnap	Executive Producer	
