= Waimauku =

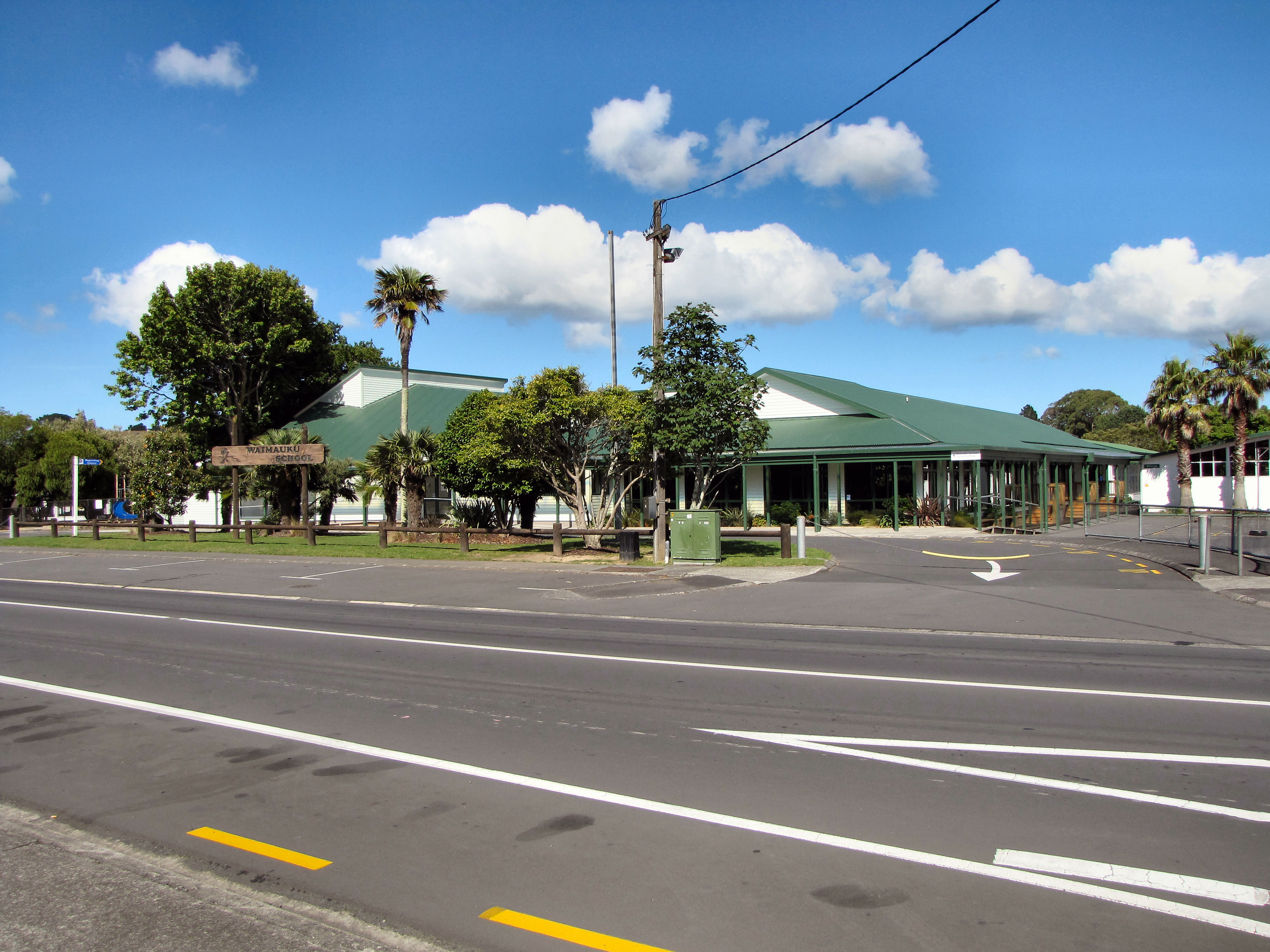
- Waimauku School
- Interactive map of Waimauku
- Coordinates: 36°46′7″S 174°29′36″E
- Country: New Zealand
- Region: Auckland
- Ward: Rodney ward
- Community board: Rodney Local Board
- Subdivision: Kumeū subdivision
- Electorates: Kaipara ki Mahurangi; Te Tai Tokerau

Government
  - Territorial Authority: Auckland Council
  - Mayor of Auckland: Wayne Brown
  - Kaipara ki Mahurangi MP: Jessica Rowe
  - Te Tai Tokerau MP: TBD

Area
  - Total: 1.44 km^{2} (0.56 sq mi)

Population (June 2025)
  - Total: 1,400
  - Density: 970/km^{2} (2,500/sq mi)

Waimauku is a town in the Auckland Region of New Zealand. It comes under the jurisdiction of Auckland Council, and is in the council's Rodney ward. Waimauku is approximately 4 kilometres west of Huapai on State Highway 16 at the junction with the road to Muriwai Beach. Helensville is 16 km to the north-west. Waimauku is a Māori word which is literally translated as wai: stream and mauku: varieties of small ferns.

Formerly a farming and fruit-growing community, the area around Waimauku now features a number of wineries and an increasing suburban and lifestyle farming population.

The Auckland Regional Council announced in 2007 that Western Line rail services would be extended to Helensville for a one-year trial period commencing in July 2008. This service would include a stop at Waimauku. A new station platform was built at Waimauku and the service commenced on 14 July 2008. The service ceased in December 2009, and the platform is currently unused.

== Etymology ==
The name Waimauku describes the banks of the Kaipara River near the modern settlement, and how when they flooded only tī mauku (cabbage trees) would be visible.

== History ==
The wider Kaipara River area has been settled by Māori since at least 1400AD. Early tribal identities of the people who lived here included Ngā Oho, Ngāti Awa, Te Kawerau ā Maki and Ngāti Whātua. By the early 18th century, the major power in the area had become Te Taoū, a distinct hapū of Ngāti Whātua.

The Waimauku Dairy Factory was established in 1909, specialising in collecting cream from the surrounding areas. In October 1915, a new butter factory was officially opened at Waimauku by the Waitemata Co-operative Dairy Company. A later and larger dairy factory opened in November 1924, serving a wide farming catchment and increasing local butter production capacity. By 1951 it was converted into a bulk receiving station for cream, and closed in 1956. In 1921, St Martin's Church was established at Waimauku.

The former dairy factory site was later repurposed and is now operated as a wedding and events venue under the name Settlers Country Manor. The property has been used for cultural and public events, including staged performances such as the operatic production Mansfield Park in 2024.

The site has also been used as a filming location. During the Auckland-based filming of A Minecraft Movie, parts of the former factory buildings and grounds were used as production locations.

Parts of the former dairy factory complex are included in Auckland Council’s Schedule of Historic Heritage Places under the Auckland Unitary Plan.

== Demographics ==
Waimauku covers 1.44 km^{2} (0.56 sq mi) and had an estimated population of 1,400 as of June 2025, with a population density of 972 people per km^{2}.

Historical population
Year	Pop.	±% p.a.
2006	1,014	—
2013	1,014	+0.00%
2018	1,164	+2.80%
2023	1,317	+2.50%
The 2006 population is for a larger area of 5.63 km^{2} Source:

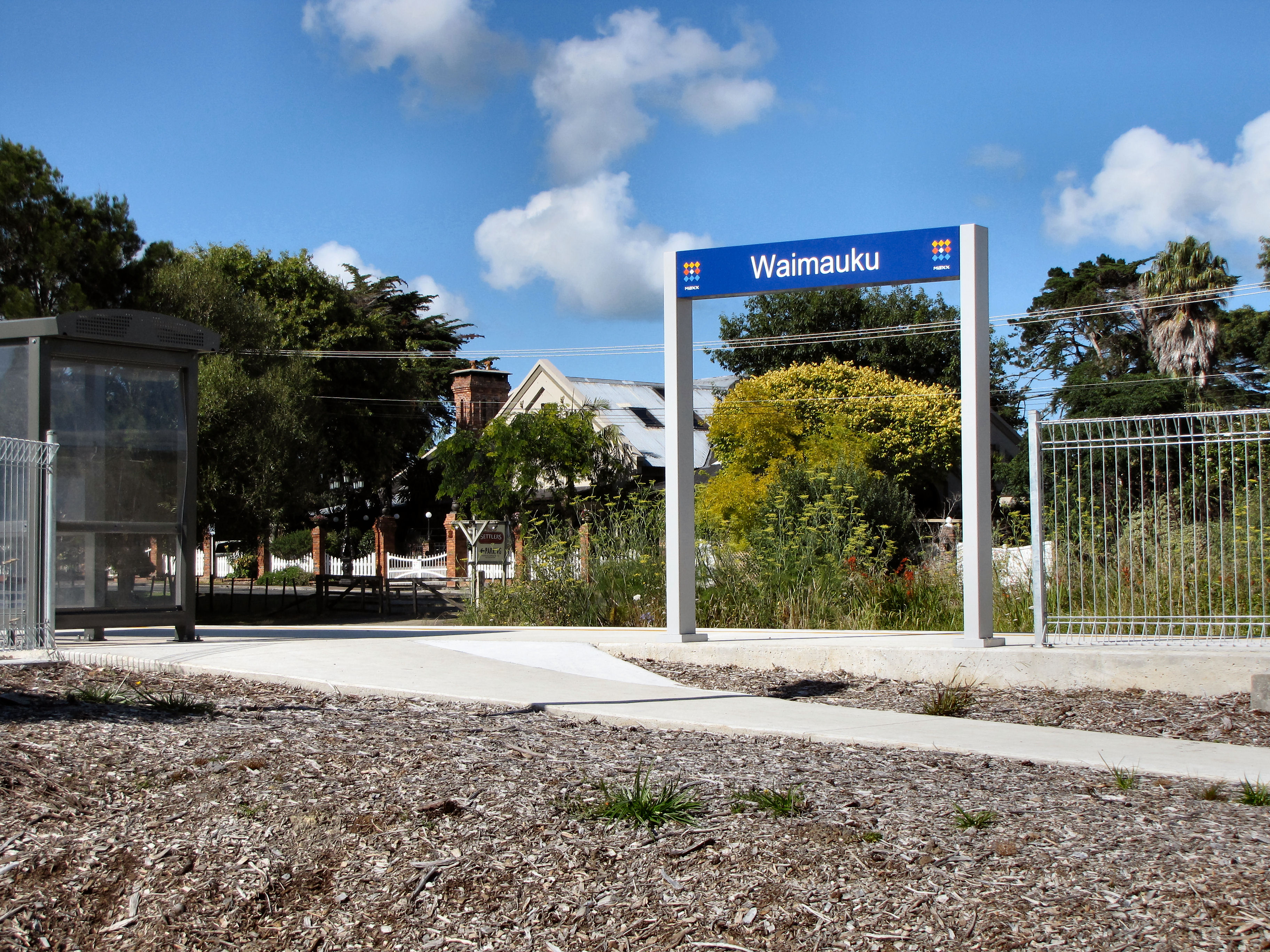
Waimauku Railway Station

Waimauku had a population of 1,317 in the 2023 New Zealand census, an increase of 153 people (13.1%) since the 2018 census, and an increase of 303 people (29.9%) since the 2013 census. There were 651 males, 663 females and 3 people of other genders in 420 dwellings. 2.3% of people identified as LGBTIQ+. The median age was 39.2 years (compared with 38.1 years nationally). There were 291 people (22.1%) aged under 15 years, 189 (14.4%) aged 15 to 29, 651 (49.4%) aged 30 to 64, and 186 (14.1%) aged 65 or older.

People could identify as more than one ethnicity. The results were 87.2% European (Pākehā); 10.5% Māori; 3.4% Pasifika; 9.6% Asian; 0.7% Middle Eastern, Latin American and African New Zealanders (MELAA); and 5.2% other, which includes people giving their ethnicity as "New Zealander". English was spoken by 97.5%, Māori language by 1.1%, Samoan by 0.2%, and other languages by 11.4%. No language could be spoken by 1.8% (e.g. too young to talk). New Zealand Sign Language was known by 0.2%. The percentage of people born overseas was 26.9, compared with 28.8% nationally.

Religious affiliations were 23.5% Christian, 2.3% Hindu, 0.2% Māori religious beliefs, 0.9% Buddhist, 0.5% New Age, and 1.1% other religions. People who answered that they had no religion were 64.7%, and 6.6% of people did not answer the census question.

Of those at least 15 years old, 204 (19.9%) people had a bachelor's or higher degree, 564 (55.0%) had a post-high school certificate or diploma, and 198 (19.3%) people exclusively held high school qualifications. The median income was $57,100, compared with $41,500 nationally. 231 people (22.5%) earned over $100,000 compared to 12.1% nationally. The employment status of those at least 15 was that 591 (57.6%) people were employed full-time, 144 (14.0%) were part-time, and 21 (2.0%) were unemployed.

== Governance ==
Waimauku is part of the Local Government Rodney Ward of Auckland Council and is part of the Kumeu Subdivision of the Rodney Local Board.

Waimauku is in the Kaipara ki Mahurangi electorate. (Previously Helensville electorate.)

== Economy ==
The township is in the North West Country Inc business improvement district zone. The business association which represents businesses from Kaukapakapa to Riverhead.

Auckland Council intends to create a new cemetery in Waimauku to replace Waikumete Cemetery, which is approaching maximum capacity. It failed to buy the undeveloped 172 hectare block of land in 2022, and in December 2024 began the process of using the Public Works Act to acquire it. The landowner is resisting the acquisition with an objection to the Environment Court. The land was originally owned by the Te Taoū hapū who also have an interest in the Council's purchase.

== Education ==
Waimauku School is a coeducational full primary (years 1–8) school with a roll of 669 students as at July 2026.

The local secondary school is Kaipara College.

== Bibliography ==
- Dunsford, Deborah (2002). Doing It Themselves: the Story of Kumeu, Huapai and Taupaki. Huapai-Kumeu Lions Club. ISBN 0-473-08969-6.
- Sheffield, C. M. (2011). Men Came Voyaging (4th ed.). Auckland: Longley Printing Company Ltd. ISBN 978-0-473-18059-1.
