= List of Lizzie McGuire books and comics =

Lizzie McGuire books
- The Lizzie McGuire logo was first used for the television series and later for the literary franchise.
- Author: Reference individual listings
- Country: United States
- Language: English
- Publisher: Disney Press (2002–2006; 2020); Tokyopop (2003–2006)
- Published: May 13, 2002 – December 20, 2005 (junior novels); May 6, 2003 – May 9, 2006 (comics); May 1, 2004 – March 8, 2006 (Mysteries); August 18, 2020 – December 15, 2020 (audiobooks)
- Media type: Print (paperback); Audiobook
- No. of books: 60

The Lizzie McGuire literary franchise is a series of books and comics based on the eponymous television show, which aired from 2001 to 2004, and its theatrical movie. The core franchise consists of 21 junior novels that were published between May 2002 and December 2005, seven Lizzie McGuire Mysteries novels that were published between May 2004 and May 2006 and two Lizzie McGuire Super Special novels that were published in May 2005 and May 2006. 15 Cine-Manga comics were published between May 2003 and May 2006, as well as four crafting books and 11 other books, including two survival guides and an episode guide. Six boxed sets that compile a number of junior novels from the franchise have also been released, as well as three audiobooks. With the exception of the Cine-Magna series, which was published by Tokyopop, all of the books in the Lizzie McGuire franchise were published by Disney Press.

== Books ==
=== Junior novels ===
No.	Title	Author	Publisher	Date	Pages	Episodes featured	Ref.
1	When Moms Attack!	Kim Ostrow	Disney Press	May 13, 2002	128	"When Moms Attack" "Between a Rock and a Bra Place"	
2	Totally Crushed!	Kiki Thorpe	Disney Press	May 13, 2002	119	"Scarlett Larry" "Lizzie and Kate's Big Adventure"	
3	Lizzie Goes Wild	Kristen Larsen	Disney Press	September 9, 2002	144	"Bad Girl McGuire" "Come Fly with Me"	
4	The Rise and Fall of the Kate Empire	Kristen Larsen	Disney Press	November 18, 2002	144	"The Rise and Fall of the Kate Empire" "Party Over Here"	
5	Picture This	Jasmine Jones	Disney Press	December 30, 2002	144	"Picture Day" "In Miranda Lizzie Does Not Trust"	
6	New Kid in School	Jasmine Jones	Disney Press	April 1, 2003	144	"Lizzie's Nightmare" "I Do, I Don't"	
7	Broken Hearts	Kiki Thorpe	Disney Press	August 4, 2003	144	"Gordo and the Girl" "First Kiss"	
8	A Very Lizzie Christmas	Lisa Papademetriou	Disney Press	September 1, 2003	144	"Xtreme Xmas" "Aaron Carter's Coming to Town"	
9	Just like Lizzie	Jasmine Jones	Disney Press	September 22, 2003	160	"Last Year's Model" "Just like Lizzie"	
10	Lizzie Loves Ethan (Note: Lizzie Loves Ethan is stylized as Lizzie ♥ Ethan.)	Jasmine Jones	Disney Press	October 13, 2003	144	"Just Friends" "Educating Ethan"	
11	On the Job	Leslie Goldman	Disney Press	December 15, 2003	128	"Working Girl" "Misadventures in Babysitting"	
12	Head Over Heels	Jasmine Jones	Disney Press	January 19, 2004	160	"The Courtship of Miranda Sanchez" "Random Acts of Miranda"	
13	Best Dressed	Jasmine Jones	Disney Press	February 16, 2004	144	"Best Dressed for Much Less" "Lizzie's Eleven"	
14	Mirror, Mirror	Jasmine Jones	Disney Press	March 15, 2004	160	"Inner Beauty" "A Gordo Story"	
15	Freaked Out	Alice Alfonsi	Disney Press	July 1, 2004	160	"Those Freaky McGuires" "Night of the Day of the Dead"	
16	Lizzie for President	Alice Alfonsi	Disney Press	July 19, 2004	144	"Election" "Facts of Life"	
17	Oh, Brother!	Jasmine Jones	Disney Press	December 6, 2004	144	"Sibling Bonds" "Bunkies"	
18	The Importance of Being Gordo	Jasmine Jones	Disney Press	January 17, 2005	144	"Gordo and the Dwarves" "Gordo's Video"	
19	All Over It!	Jasmine Jones	Disney Press	May 23, 2005	144	"Obsession" "The Longest Yard"	
20	The 'Rents	Alice Alfonsi	Disney Press	August 1, 2005	144	"Mom's Best Friend" "Lizzie Strikes Out"	
21	High-Five	Alice Alfonsi	Disney Press	December 20, 2005	128	"I've Got Rhythmic" "One of the Guys"	

=== Mysteries ===
No.	Title	Author	Publisher	Date	Pages	Ref.
1	Get a Clue!	Lisa Banim	Disney Press	May 1, 2004	128	
2	Case at Camp Get-Me-Outie	Lisa Banim	Disney Press	July 15, 2004	128	
3	Case of the Missing She-Geek	Lisa Banim	Disney Press	September 1, 2004	128	
4	Hands Off My Crush-Boy!	Lisa Banim	Disney Press	October 1, 2004	128	
5	In the Doghouse (Note: In the Doghouse was originally titled Case of the Doggone Dogs.)	Lisa Banim	Disney Press	April 1, 2005	128	
6	Case of the Kate Haters (Note: Case of the Kate Haters was originally titled When Cheerleaders Attack!.)	Lisa Banim	Disney Press	September 1, 2005	128	
7	Spring it On!	Samantha Maridian	Disney Press	March 8, 2006	144	

=== Crafting books ===
Title	Author	Publisher	Date	Pages	Ref.
Decorating with Lizzie McGuire	Carol Dahlstrom	Disney Press	June 15, 2004	80	
Scrapbooking with Lizzie McGuire	Carol Dahlstrom	Disney Press	June 15, 2004	80	
Beading with Lizzie McGuire	Susan M. Banker	Disney Press	September 21, 2004	80	
Fashion It! with Lizzie McGuire	Paula Marshall	Disney Press	September 21, 2004	80	

=== Super specials ===
No.	Title	Author	Publisher	Date	Pages	Ref.
1	A Very Lizzie Summer	Lisa Papademetriou	Disney Press	May 23, 2005	272	
2	A Totally Hottie Summer	Samantha Maridan	Disney Press	May 9, 2006	272	

=== Other books ===
Title	Author	Publisher	Date	Pages	Ref.
My Quiz Book	Jasmine Jones	Disney Press	September 2, 2002	80	
The Lizzie McGuire Movie: Junior Novelization	David Cody Weiss & Bobbi J.G. Weiss	Disney Press	March 17, 2003	144	
Don't Even Go There!: A Little Book of Lizzie-Isms	—	Disney Press	June 9, 2003	64	
The Orchids and Gumbo Poker Club	Alice Alfonsi	Disney Press	November 10, 2003	128	
My Crush-Tacular Book of Valentines	—	Disney Press	December 1, 2003	32	
Survival Guide: School	—	Disney Press	October 4, 2004	96	
Survival Guide: Family	—	Disney Press	October 4, 2004	96	
Lizzie McGuire Official Episode Guide	Heidi Hurst	Disney Press	November 15, 2004	144	
My Secret Journal	Heidi Hurst	Disney Press	February 14, 2005	48	
Totally Stylin'	Andrew Bevan	Disney Press	June 18, 2005	48	
My Secret Journal Part II	—	Disney Press	November 9, 2005	48	

== Comics ==
No.	Publisher	Date	Pages	Episodes featured	Ref.
1	Tokyopop	May 6, 2003	96	"Pool Party" "Picture Day"	
2	Tokyopop	September 9, 2003	96	"Rumors" "I've Got Rhythmic"	
3	Tokyopop	November 4, 2003	96	"When Moms Attack" "Misadventures in Babysitting"	
4	Tokyopop	December 9, 2003	96	"I Do, I Don't" "Come Fly with Me"	
5	Tokyopop	March 9, 2004	96	"Lizzie's Nightmare" "Sibling Bonding"	
6	Tokyopop	June 8, 2004	96	"Mom's Best Friend" "Movin' on Up"	
Movie	Tokyopop	July 6, 2004	96	—	
7	Tokyopop	August 10, 2004	96	"Over the Hill" "Just Friends"	
8	Tokyopop	October 12, 2004	96	"Gordo and the Girl" "You're a Good Man Lizzie McGuire"	
9	Tokyopop	December 7, 2004	96	"Magic Train" "Grubby Longjohn's Olde Tyme Revue"	
10	Tokyopop	February 8, 2005	96	"Inner Beauty" "Best Dressed for Less"	
11	Tokyopop	April 12, 2005	96	"In Miranda, Lizzie Does Not Trust" "The Longest Yard"	
12	Tokyopop	June 7, 2005	96	"Random Acts of Miranda" "Between a Rock and a Bra Place"	
13	Tokyopop	August 9, 2005	96	"Gordo's Video" "Obsession"	
14	Tokyopop	May 9, 2006	96	"Those Freaky McGuires" "Bunkies"	

== Box sets ==
Title	Publisher	Date	Books included	Ref.
My Very First Way Cool Boxed Set!, Volumes 1–4	Disney Press	October 1, 2003	When Moms Attack! Totally Crushed! Lizzie Goes Wild; The Rise and Fall of the Kate Empire	
My Awesome 8-Book Collection	Disney Press	2003 (Note: The exact date that My Awesome 8-Book Collection was released is unknown; however, the back cover lists 2003 as the copyright year.)	When Moms Attack! Totally Crushed! Lizzie Goes Wild; The Rise and Fall of the Kate Empire; Picture This; New Kid in School; Broken Hearts; Just like Lizzie	
My Second Way Cool Boxed Set!	Disney Press	September 1, 2004	Picture This; New Kid in School; Broken Hearts; The Orchids and Gumbo Poker Club	
My Third Way Cool Boxed Set!	Disney Press	June 1, 2005	Get a Clue! Case at Camp Get-Me-Outie; Just like Lizzie; Lizzie Loves Ethan	
Not-So-Ordinary Adventures	Tokyopop	October 11, 2005	Cine-Manga Vol. 1 Cine-Manga Vol. 2 Cine-Manga Vol. 3 Cine-Manga Vol. 4	
My Totally Awesome 8-Book Collection	Disney Press	2005 (Note: The exact date that My Totally Awesome 8-Book Collection was released is unknown; however, the back cover lists 2005 as the copyright year.)	Lizzie Loves Ethan; On the Job; Head Over Heels; Best Dressed; Mirror, Mirror; Freaked Out; Get a Clue! Case at Camp Get-Me-Outie	

== Audiobooks ==
Title	Publisher	Date	Ref.
The Lizzie McGuire Movie	Disney Press	August 18, 2020	
My Very First Way Cool Boxed Set!, Volumes 1–4	Disney Press	October 27, 2020	
A Very Lizzie Summer & A Totally Hottie Summer	Disney Press	December 15, 2020	
