= Ninety-Five Senses =

2023 animated short film

- Directed by: Jared and Jerusha Hess
- Written by: Chris Bowman; Hubbel Palmer
- Produced by: Tori Baker; Miles David Romney
- Starring: Tim Blake Nelson
- Music by: John Hancock
- Production companies: MAST; V42 Venture Studio Fund
- Release date: August 13, 2022 (HollyShorts Film Festival)
- Running time: 14 minutes
- Country: United States
- Language: English

Ninety-Five Senses is a 2022 American independent animated short film directed by Jared and Jerusha Hess.

== Summary ==
An inmate on death row (Tim Blake Nelson) reflects his own mistakes while facing his own mortality.

== Production ==
A production team of U.S. and Latin American animators created the 13-minute film in six different styles.

== Accolades ==
96th Academy Awards: Nominated for the Academy Award for Best Animated Short Film
