= Chris Bowman (writer) =

American screenwriter

- Occupation: Screenwriter • director
- Years active: 2006–present
- Notable work: A Minecraft Movie; Ninety-Five Senses; American Fork; Middle School: The Worst Years of My Life; Masterminds

Chris Bowman is an American screenwriter and director.

He is best known for writing A Minecraft Movie, Middle School: The Worst Years of My Life, Masterminds, and the Academy Award-nominated short film Ninety-Five Senses, all with frequent collaborator Hubbel Palmer.

In 2014, Bowman and Palmer were named to Variety's list of "10 Screenwriters to Watch." Their original script for Ninety-Five Senses was nominated for a Humanitas Prize in 2023; the following year, the short received a nod in the Best Animated Short Film category at the 96th Academy Awards.

The pair first collaborated in 2007, when Bowman directed the independent film American Fork (later released as Humble Pie), a dark comedy written by and starring Palmer. The film also featured William Baldwin, Mary Lynn Rajskub, Kathleen Quinlan, and Bruce McGill.

Bowman is a native of Tucson, Arizona.
