= Middle School: The Worst Years of My Life =

2011 novel by James Patterson

- Author: James Patterson; Chris Tebbetts
- Illustrator: Laura Park
- Language: English
- Series: Middle School
- Genre: Graphic novel, comedy
- Publisher: Little, Brown and Company
- Publication date: June 27, 2011
- Publication place: United States
- Media type: Print (hardcover, paperback)
- Pages: 283
- ISBN: 978-0316101875
- Followed by: Middle School: Get Me Out of Here!

Middle School: The Worst Years of My Life is a realistic fiction novel by James Patterson and Chris Tebbetts that serves as the beginning of Patterson's Middle School series. Published in the United States by Little, Brown and Company on June 27, 2011, the book follows sixth grader Rafe Khatchadorian as he begins middle school and copes with the awkwardness of adolescence, "crushes, bullying, family issues", as he attempts to break every school rule in the code of conduct. The book received critical acclaim from many reviewers and spawned a sequel, Middle School: Get Me Out of Here!

== Plot ==
12-year old sixth-grader Rafe Khatchadorian is bored at Hills Village Middle School (HVMS) during his first day there.To pass the time, he and his muse Leonardo 'Leo' the Silent invent "Operation R.A.F.E." ("Rules Aren't For Everyone"), a challenge to break every rule in his middle school handbook.

Rafe starts Operation R.A.F.E. by pulling the fire alarm and not getting caught. Leo awards Rafe points based on how bad the rule Rafe breaks is or when Rafe gets punishments like detention. Leo also gives Rafe three lives. Rafe loses a life whenever he misses the chance to break another rule or hurts others. Rafe first starts breaking minor rules, such as running in the halls or chewing gum in class. After getting encouraged by Leo, Rafe breaks more rules, such as being inappropriate in English class, leaving trash on tables in the cafeteria, being late for class, and riding a scooter during gym class. During Halloween, Rafe wears a ninja costume in school. The vice-principal, Mrs. Stricker, tells him to take the costume off, and Rafe removes his ninja costume and runs around the school wearing "just a pair of sneakers and a big old smile." He gets sent to the principal's office and receives detention after school. Due to this detention Rafe loses his very first life. He served it with his English teacher, Mrs. Donatello, who is also the detention monitor.

At home, Rafe deals with a lot of personal problems and gets grounded due to what he’s done at school. His mother, Jules, constantly works double shifts at a Swifty's Diner and barely gets to see Rafe and his sister, Georgia. Jules's verbally abusive fiancé Carl (aka Bear) "watches" over him when his mother is not home and gets mad at Rafe for not signing up for football.

Rafe finds consolation in a popular, pretty girl named Jeanne Galletta, who is also a student council candidate. She's a little skeceptical of Operation R.A.F.E. and encourages him to work on his schoolwork. So, Rafe starts acting normally in school until the school bully, Miller, steals Rafe's journal, which has his artistic drawings and his plans for Operation R.A.F.E inside. Miller charges $1 per journal page, which forces Rafe to steal Bear's energy drinks and sell them for money. Rafe also fights with Miller to get his notebook back and gets an in-school suspension. Nothing works,While Rafe tries to get his notebook back, he puts a halt on Operation R.A.F.E pranks and rule-breaking. Jeanne is also helping to tutor Rafe, and she tells him that his grades are so poor that he might need to repeat the sixth grade. Rafe runs to the boys' bathroom to cry, and Jeanne follows Rafe into the boys' bathroom and receives her very first detention. Rafe runs into the girls' bathroom and gets a detention as well. Rafe loses all three lives and the Operation R.A.F.E. game. Later, Leo encourages Rafe to vandalize the school, and says that being 'normal' is 'boring'. Early in the next day, Rafe vandalizes the school gym, leaving a message, "STAY IN SCHOOL". Rafe gets taken in by two policemen, and when he returns home, he sees Bear physically hit Jules, knocking her down and causing Georgia to call 911. Then, the police take him and his family. When Rafe goes back to school, he fights Miller and has a parent-teacher conference. During the conference, Rafe learns that he is expelled.

By the end of the book, after a suggestion from Ms. Donatello, Rafe is preparing to head to Air Brook Academy, a non-traditional art school.

== Characters ==
- Rafael "Rafe" Khatchadorian – The main character of the story is a sixth-grader (around 12 years old) at Hills Village Middle School who does not have many friends aside from Leo the silent.
- Leonardo the Silent – Rafe's quiet, imaginary friend who gets Rafe into trouble. Rather than being a figment of fantasy, like most imaginary friends, Leo the Silent was originally a real person – Rafe's twin brother, Leonardo, who died of meningitis in the book when he and Rafe were three years old. In the movie, Leo is Rafe's younger brother who died of cancer.
- Georgia Khatchadorian – Rafe's adopted younger sister who is nine years old. She occasionally quarrels with her brother and often acts as the family tattletale whenever she hears a secret. Jules adopted her after Leo died, explaining why Georgia has no similarities in looks to her mother.
- Jeanne Galletta – One of Rafe's only friends, and crush, at HVMS. She also tutors Rafe.
- Miller the Killer – The school bully. He thinks Rafe is using Operation R.A.F.E. to threaten his status as the biggest troublemaker in school. Miller eventually pushes Rafe to a point where he beats him up (this happens towards the end of the book).
- Jules Khatchadorian – Rafe and Georgia's single mother. A character attributed for making Rafe quit his game in the middle of the story.
- Carl "Bear" – Jules' abusive and lazy fiancé, from whom she ends up parting. Bear is mean to the kids as well.
- Ms. Donatello "Dragon Lady" – A teacher of HVMS who seems mean at first, but turns out to be nice and helps Rafe. She is Rafe's English teacher and is also the after-school detention monitor.

== Accomplishments ==
=== Praise ===
"The book's ultra short chapters, dynamic artwork, and message that ‘normal is boring’ should go to kids who don't fit in the mold that there's a place for them, too." – Publishers Weekly

"As Patterson artfully weaves a deeper and more thought-provoking tale of childhood coping mechanisms and everyday school and family realities, readers are drawn into a deeper understanding of and compassion for the main characters." – School Library Journal

"Incredibly detailed and imaginative illustrations... add depth and humor.... an enjoyable story that even the most reluctant readers should enjoy." – Library Media Connection

=== Awards ===
The book was named a Young Adult Library Services Association (YALSA) 2012 Top Ten Quick Picks for Reluctant Young Readers award.

Based on Middle School’s success James Patterson was nominated for the Children's Book Council's Author of the Year award.

=== Commercial success ===
Middle School, The Worst Years of My Life was a No. 1 The New York Times best-seller and a No. 1 Indiebound best-seller. It was also made into an audiobook by Chivers Children's CDs.

== Sequels ==
Middle School: Get Me Out of Here! was published on May 7, 2012. It follows Rafe in his new art school as he trades Operation: R.A.F.E. for Operation: Get a Life.

On March 18, 2013, another book, which is told from the perspective of Rafe's sister, Georgia, called Middle School: My Brother is a Big, Fat Liar, was released.

On June 24, 2013, another book called Middle School: How I Survived Bullies, Broccoli, and Snake Hill was released.

On May 22, 2014, another book called Middle School: Ultimate Showdown was released, which did not have a story base, and was more of an interactive activity book instead.

Further sequels include:

- Middle School: Save Rafe! (2014)
- Middle School: Just My Rotten Luck (2015)
- Middle School: Rafe’s Aussie Adventure (2015), which was republished as Middle School: Escape to Australia in 2017 with new illustrations
- Middle School: Dog's Best Friend (2016)
- Middle School: From Hero to Zero (2018)
- Middle School: Born to Rock (2019)
- Middle School: Master of Disaster (2020)
- Middle School: Field Trip Fiasco (2021)
- Middle School: It’s a Zoo In Here! (2021)
- Middle School: Winter Blunderland (2022)
- Middle School: Million Dollar Mess (2024)
- Middle School: Too Uncool for School (2025)

== Film adaptation ==
A film adaptation was released by CBS Films in October 2016. Griffin Gluck played Rafe Khatchadorian.
