= Masterminds (2016 film) =

2016 film by Jared Hess

- Theatrical release poster with the film’s original release month
- Directed by: Jared Hess
- Written by: Chris Bowman; Hubbel Palmer; Emily Spivey
- Produced by: John Goldwyn; Lorne Michaels
- Starring: Zach Galifianakis; Owen Wilson; Kristen Wiig; Kate McKinnon; Leslie Jones; Jason Sudeikis
- Cinematography: Erik Wilson
- Edited by: Keith Brachmann; David Rennie
- Music by: Geoff Zanelli
- Production companies: Michaels-Goldwyn; Broadway Video
- Distributed by: Relativity Studios
- Release dates: September 26, 2016 (TCL Chinese Theatre); September 30, 2016 (United States)
- Running time: 94 minutes
- Countries: United States; Canada
- Language: English
- Budget: $25 million
- Box office: $30.9 million

Masterminds is a 2016 crime comedy film based on the October 1997 Loomis Fargo robbery in North Carolina. Directed by Jared Hess and written by Chris Bowman, Hubbel Palmer and Emily Spivey, it stars Zach Galifianakis, Owen Wilson, Kristen Wiig, Kate McKinnon, Leslie Jones and Jason Sudeikis.

It premiered in Los Angeles on September 26, 2016, and was theatrically released in the United States on September 30, 2016, by Relativity EuropaCorp Distribution and Relativity Media. It received mixed reviews and grossed $30.9 million.

== Plot ==
In March 1997, Loomis Fargo & Company suffered a staggering theft of approximately $18 million, carried out by an insider—security guard Philip Johnson. This audacious act inspires Steve Eugene Chambers (Owen Wilson) and Kelly Campbell (Kristen Wiig) to concoct their own scheme to rob Loomis. They enlist the help of David Scott Ghantt (Zach Galifianakis), an armored car driver for Loomis, who is drawn into their nefarious plot.

As part of this scheme, David and Kelly, who work together at Loomis—known for its fleet of armored vehicles transporting cash for clients—find themselves tangled in a web of deceit and romance. David is engaged to Jandice, a not-so-pleasant woman, while Kelly has a history with Steve, her childhood neighbor. Oftentimes, Kelly leads David on in a way that ignites his affections, pushing him to the brink of obsession. Steve, sensing this emotional leverage, crafts a manipulative plan to get David on board with the robbery.

Under the alias "Gepetto", Steve arranges a clandestine meeting with David at a restaurant, skillfully masking his identity. Initially skeptical, David's resolve crumbles when Kelly tantalizes him with the notion of a life together in Mexico, the perfect getaway after the heist.

After some rather unorthodox training, David finds himself inside Loomis' vault, loading up the entire cash supply into their getaway vehicle. Just before fleeing, he meticulously removes three CCTV tapes but inadvertently overlooks one. The next day, under a new identity as "Michael McKinney", a name Steve has fabricated using the driver's license of a friend, David escapes to Mexico with $20,000 in hand. Meanwhile, Steve absconds with the majority of the loot, counting around $17 million.

The FBI takes an immediate interest in the case through Agent Scanlon (Leslie Jones) and her partner. They zero in on David as the primary suspect, wholly unaware of Steve's pivotal role in the heist. As the plot thickens, Steve contemplates abandoning David, but Kelly, torn by guilt, opposes this idea.

In Mexico, David faces a close call with three Interpol agents pursuing him. A fateful phone call to Kelly reveals Steve's true identity when David accidentally discovers his name from the ID in a wallet Kelly provided. To eliminate potential threats, Steve hires the real McKinney (Jason Sudeikis) to hunt down David. Their first encounter is chaotic, involving attempted gunfire, which ends with David managing to evade capture.

When David uncovers how deep the betrayal runs, he contacts Kelly, learning that Steve has no intentions of sending the money he promised. Knocked out cold by McKinney, he regains consciousness only to find himself at a crossroads; upon recognizing their shared experiences, he and McKinney bond over their pasts.

Desperate, David calls Steve, threatening to turn himself into the authorities unless $6 million is wired to him. Meanwhile, tension escalates as Kelly is confronted by Jandice (Kate McKinnon), leading to her kidnapping after a close encounter with danger. At the airport, fate intertwines their paths once again, as McKinney, in a twist of conscience, decides to help David, sacrificing his own escape plan.

During a lavish party hosted by Steve, the FBI works undercover to catch Steve confessing, while David sneaks in to rescue Kelly. Their escape attempts lead to a chaotic car crash, forcing them to confront Steve. In a moment of cunning, David cleverly coaxes a confession from Steve, providing the FBI with enough evidence to arrest the entire crew, including Kelly.

The aftermath sees David sentenced to seven years while Steve faces eleven. A staggering $2 million of the stolen money remains undiscovered, cleverly hidden by David in waterproof boxes beneath a lake. Upon his release, David is met by McKinney, and the two set off to reunite with Kelly, setting the stage for what comes next in this thrilling escapade.

== Cast ==
- Zach Galifianakis as David Scott Ghantt
- Kristen Wiig as Kelly Campbell
- Owen Wilson as Steven Eugene "Steve" Chambers
- Jason Sudeikis as Michael Aaron "Mike" McKinney
- Kate McKinnon as Jandice Gartrell
- Leslie Jones as FBI Special Agent Scanlon
- Mary Elizabeth Ellis as Michelle Chambers
- Ken Marino as Doug
- Karsten Friske as Cort Chambers
- Dallas Edwards as Ken Chambers
- Devin Ratray as Runny
- Jon Daly as Detective
- Ross Kimball as Eric
- Jordan Israel as Valet
- Njema Williams as Ty
- Kerry Rossall as Trunk Hostage

== Production ==
On February 1, 2013, Jim Carrey joined the cast. On June 10, 2013, Owen Wilson joined the cast. On December 3, 2013, Zach Galifianakis joined the cast when Carrey dropped out. On May 16, 2014, Kristen Wiig joined the cast, and on June 25, 2014, Jason Sudeikis was added. On June 30, 2014, Ken Marino, Kate McKinnon, Devin Ratray, Leslie Jones, Mary Elizabeth Ellis and Ross Kimball joined the cast. On July 10, Jon Daly joined the cast to play an FBI agent. The film was produced by Brent Almond. David Ghantt was a technical consultant, but due to outstanding court-ordered restitution for his part in the heist, he was not paid.

=== Filming ===
The title used in media coverage was Untitled Armored Car. Principal photography began on July 7, 2014, in Old Fort and Swannanoa, in the Asheville area of North Carolina.

On July 29, Galifianakis was spotted in a prisoner's costume during filming in a redressed street in downtown Asheville. The BB&T Center building, also the location of the production office, was transformed into the "Park Street Citizens Bank", with a Loomis Fargo burgundy truck parked outside. Scenes were also filmed on the steps of Buncombe County Courthouse, inside the Buncombe County Jail, and in front of the Mediterranean Restaurant.

== Release ==
The film was released in the United States on September 30, 2016. It was previously scheduled for release on August 14, 2015, August 7, 2015, and August 19, 2015, a date which, in July 2015, Relativity rescheduled to October 9, 2015. The company pushed back the date because it was facing a financial crisis. The film was pulled from the October 9, 2015 release date before being released on September 30, 2016.

Masterminds was projected to gross $10 million from 3,042 theaters in its opening weekend. It made $2,325,546 on its first day and grossed $6,541,205 on its opening weekend, finishing 6th at the box office.

It went on to gross $30.9 million worldwide against a $25 million production budget. Additional prints and advertising costs were estimated in excess of $20 million.

== Reception ==
On Rotten Tomatoes the film has an approval rating of 34% based on 100 critic reviews. The site's critical consensus reads, "Mastermind's great cast and stranger-than-fiction true story are largely wasted on a scattershot comedy with a handful of funny moments and far too much wackiness." On Metacritic, the film has a weighted average score of 47 out of 100 based on 29 critics, indicating "mixed or average reviews". Audiences polled by CinemaScore gave the film an average grade of "B−" on an A+ to F scale.

Peter Travers of Rolling Stone magazine gave the film one-and-a-half out of four stars, mainly criticizing its lack of good jokes: "The laughs evaporate almost as soon as they land, and some (make that most) of them don't land at all.... Masterminds owes us our two hours back." On the other hand, Matt Zoller Seitz of RogerEbert.com gave the film three out of four stars, stating that "If smart dumb comedies hold a place in your heart, you'll like 'Masterminds.'" Although he acknowledged the film's weakness in its length, structure, and pacing, he emphasized that "Most of the time in these kinds of films the notes of sweetness, naivete and regret feel forced.... Here, though, you believe the sweetness, because Hess and his cast sell it with poker faces." Richard Brody of The New Yorker also gave praise to the film, writing that "Yes, the comedy is funny—even when it's not laugh-out-loud funny, it's sparklingly inventive and charmingly loopy—but, above all, it has the religious intensity and spiritual resonance that marks all of Hess's other films, and it extends his world of ideas into wild new realms, extends his vision into darker corners of existence than he had formerly contemplated." He also observed the filmmaking of Hess as "suggest[ing] a kinship with the transcendental cinema of Robert Bresson and Carl Theodor Dreyer. ... His images belong to a similar realm of astonishment, even if his are frankly comedic where theirs are irreconcilably tragic."

The film was a finalist for an AML Award in film.
