= Hubbel Palmer =

American actor and screenwriter (born 1977)

- Occupations: Actor, screenwriter
- Years active: 2001-present

Hubbel Palmer is an American screenwriter and actor. He is best known for writing A Minecraft Movie, Middle School: The Worst Years of My Life, Masterminds, and the Oscar-nominated short film Ninety-Five Senses, all with frequent collaborator Chris Bowman. In 2007, Palmer wrote and starred in the independent film American Fork (a.k.a. Humble Pie).

== Filmography ==
Actor

Year	Title	Role	Notes
2001	Leon	Leon Lefleur	
2001	Jip		
2003	Pride & Prejudice: A Latter-Day Comedy	William Collins	
2005	Pastor Inqvist's Trip to Orlando	Pastor Inqvist	Voice role
2006	The Sasquatch Gang	Hobie Plumber	
2007	Moving McAllister	Carl	Also dialogue consultant
2007	Halfway Home	Hubbel Brackton	
2007	American Fork (a.k.a. "Humble Pie")	Tracy Orbison	
2010	Cafe	Avatar	

Writer

- American Fork (a.k.a. "Humble Pie") (2007)
- Masterminds (2016)
- Middle School: The Worst Years of My Life (2016)
- Ninety-Five Senses (2023)
- A Minecraft Movie (2025)
