= Lisa Papademetriou =

American author of young adult fiction (born 1971)

- Born: August 25, 1971 (age 55)
- Occupation: Novelist
- Spouse: Ali Usman
- Children: 1
- Writing career
- Period: 2005-present
- Genre: Young Adult Fiction
- Notable works: Sixth Grade Glommers, Norks, and Me; The Wizard, The Witch, and Two Girls from Jersey
- Website: www.lisapapa.com

Lisa Papademetriou (born August 25, 1971) is an American author of young adult fiction.

== Life and career ==
Papademetriou was born August 25, 1971, and grew up in Houston, Texas, attending West University Elementary School, Lanier Middle School, and Episcopal High School of Houston. She graduated from Vassar College in 1993. Her first book, Sixth Grade Glommers, Norks, and Me, was published in 2006 by Hyperion. She has written/adapted over thirty books for children and young adults. Her 2005 book, M or F? : a novel is in over 500 libraries according to WorldCat. She also wrote the "Accidentally" series (Accidentally Fabulous, Accidentally Famous, Accidentally Fooled, and Accidentally Friends), How to Be a Girly Girl in Just 10 Days, and Ice Dreams for Scholastic's line of Candy Apple books.
