= Floating cities and islands in fiction =

Science fiction concept

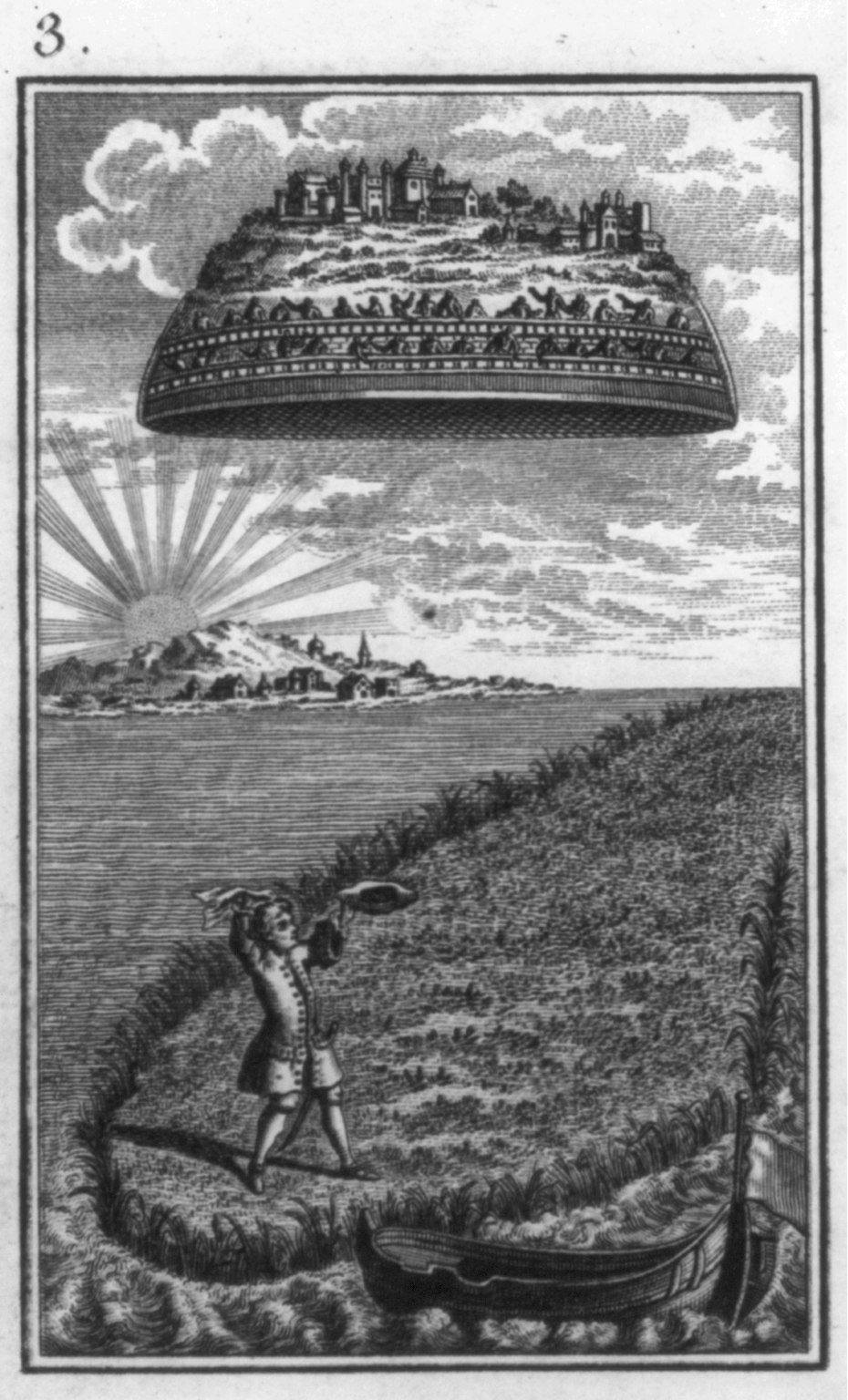
The flying island of Laputa from Gulliver's Travels. (Illustrated 1795.)

In science fiction and fantasy, floating cities and islands are a common trope, ranging from cities and islands that float on water to ones that float in the atmosphere of a planet by purported scientific technologies or by magical means. While very large floating structures have been constructed or proposed in real life, aerial cities and islands remain in the realm of fiction.

== Seaborne cities and islands ==
Seaborne floating islands have been found in literature since Homer's Odyssey, written near the end of the 8th century BCE, described the island of Aeolia. They reappear in Pliny the Elder's Natural History of the 1st century CE.

Richard Head's 1673 novel The Floating Island describes a fictional island named Scotia Moria. In The Voyages of Doctor Dolittle, the characters sail to a floating island, which later becomes fixed in place. In the DC Comics universe, Themyscira is sometimes depicted as a group of floating islands. In Jules Verne's Propeller Island, the characters are on an artificial floating island that is actually a ship. In Yann Martel's novel Life of Pi, there is a floating island. In Michael Ende's children's novel Jim Button and Luke the Engine Driver, the main characters resolve the presumed problem of overpopulation of the original island by attaching a floating extension to it.

== Airborne cities and islands ==
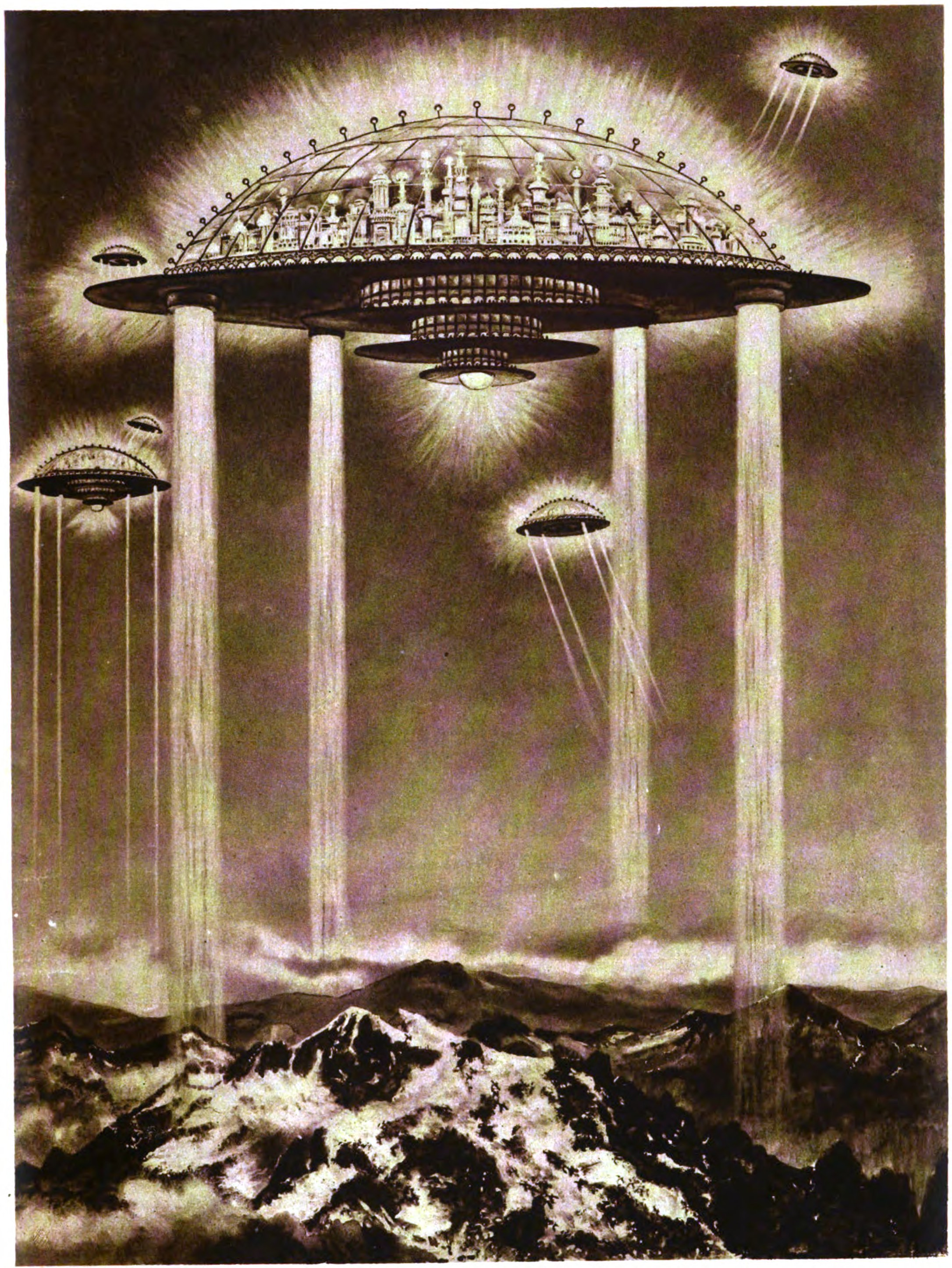
Gernsback's fictional vision of a floating city ten thousand years in the future. (Illustrated by Frank R. Paul, 1922.)

=== Earth ===
In the treatise De Grandine et Tonitruis ("On Hail and Thunder", 815), Carolingian bishop Agobard of Lyon describes Magonia, a cloud realm populated by felonious aerial sailors.

In the novel Gulliver's Travels (1726) by Jonathan Swift, the island city of Laputa is purported to float through the use of artificial magnetism. It was primarily a fictional device that was intended to satirize far-fetched pseudo-scientific proposals:

I turned back and perceived a vast Opaque Body between me and the sun, moving forwards towards the island; it appeared to be about two Miles high, and hid the Sun six or seven minutes.[...] the Reader can hardly conceive my Astonishment, to behold an Island in the Air, inhabited by Men, who are able (as it should seem) to raise, or sink, or put into a Progressive Motion, as they pleased.

During the 1920s, science fiction author Hugo Gernsback speculated about floating cities of the future, suggesting that 10,000 years hence "the city the size of New York will float several miles above the surface of the earth, where the air is cleaner and purer and free from disease carrying bacteria." To stay in the air, "four gigantic generators will shoot earthward electric rays which by reaction with the earth produce the force to keep the city aloft."

In 1960, the architects Buckminster Fuller and Shoji Sadao proposed the construction of a 1-mile-diameter (1.6 km) thermal airship, which they called Cloud Nine. This megastructure would be a geodesic sphere that, once it was sufficiently heated by sunlight, would become airborne. Fuller and Sadao envisioned that Cloud Nine would float freely in the Earth's atmosphere, giving residents and passengers a migratory lifestyle. They believed that it might be a partial solution to the depletion of non-renewable resources.

A team including Buckminster Fuller and Shoji Sadao was commissioned by United States Department of Housing and Urban Development to design the Triton City, a floating city intended to provide housing near Tokyo or Baltimore. The proposal called for tetrahedron–shaped modules supporting large housing blocks of 5,000 inhabitants each, and which would be anchored to the ground. A large model of the habitat is on display in the lobby of the Johnson Presidential Library in Austin, Texas.

In Isaac Asimov's story "Shah Guido G.", the hereditary Secretary-General of the United Nations ("Sekjen") is a tyrant who rules the Earth from a flying island called Atlantis.

=== Venus ===
A design similar to Fuller's Cloud Nine may permit habitation in the upper atmosphere of Venus, with temperature and atmospheric pressure being incredibly high on the surface. As scientifically and fictionally described by Geoffrey A. Landis, the easiest planet (other than Earth) to place floating cities at this point would appear to be Venus. Because the thick carbon dioxide atmosphere is 50% denser than Earth's atmosphere, breathable air with a composition similar to the latter is a lifting gas in the dense Venerean atmosphere, with over 60% of the lifting power that helium has on Earth. At an altitude of 50 km above the Venerean surface, the environment is the "most Earthlike in the solar system", according to Landis, with a pressure of approximately 1 bar and temperatures ranging between 0–50 °C (32–122 °F).

=== Other planets ===
In addition to Venus, floating cities have been proposed in science fiction on several other planets. For example, floating cities might also permit settlement of the outer three gas giants, as the gas giants lack solid surfaces. Jupiter is not promising for habitation due to its high gravity, escape velocity and radiation, but the Solar System's other gas giants (Saturn, Uranus, and Neptune) may be more practical. In 1978, the British Interplanetary Society's Project Daedalus envisioned floating factories in the atmospheres of Jupiter refining helium-3 to produce fuel for an interstellar probe. Michael McCollum notes that the "surface" gravity of Saturn (that is, at the visible cloud layer, where the atmospheric pressure is about the same as Earth's) is very close to that of Earth, and in his novel The Clouds of Saturn, he envisioned cities floating in the Saturnian atmosphere, where the buoyancy is provided by envelopes of hydrogen heated by fusion reactors. Uranus and Neptune also have upper atmosphere gravities comparable to Earth's, and even lower escape velocities than Saturn. Cecelia Holland populated Jupiter, Saturn and Uranus with mutant humans, the Styth, in floating cities in her only SF novel, Floating Worlds (1975). Donald Moffitt's novel Jovian (2003) features floating cities forever floating in the Jovian atmosphere, a worthwhile enterprise due to their ability to extract useful gases. The book concentrates on the cultural differences (and political tensions) developing between "Jovian" humans and Earthbound ones.

== Fictional examples ==
=== Literature ===
- Sky Island is a 1912 book by L. Frank Baum with the titular area split between the Kingdom of the Blues and the Pinks.
- "Cities in the Air" by Edmond Hamilton (Air Wonder Stories, November–December 1929).
- The Cities in Flight series (1950–1962) by James Blish proposes a universe in which cities cast adrift from the Earth, powered by a fictional spindizzy drive.
- The novel Well of the Worlds (1953) by Henry Kuttner features a parallel world full of islands floating in the air.
- In the novel The Ringworld Engineers (1979), Louis Wu seeks a way to save the Ringworld by bartering for information in the library of a floating city.
- The novel Orion Shall Rise (1983) by Poul Anderson features an aerostat city called Skyholm, located above – and dominating – a post-apocalyptic France.
- In the novel Maiden Flight (1988), a post-apocalyptic civilization lives in floating cities named for some of the now-destroyed land-based cities, e.g. Calgary 5. These are highly-evolved spherical mile-wide aerostats that follow wind patterns across the face of nuclear-war-ravaged Earth. Travel between such cities is by zeppelin.
- In the 1992 novel, Snow Crash, by Neal Stephenson, a floating collection of refugee craft are attached surrounding the decommissioned nuclear aircraft carrier, the USS Enterprise, to form The Raft.
- In the 2024 novel, Playground, by Richard Powers, a tech consortium seeks to convert the Polynesian island of Makatea to a base from which to manufacture and launch artificial floating islands.
- Airhaven is a floating city in the Mortal Engines Quartet, that, through attaching gas bags, lifted itself into the air to avoid being devoured by the mobile Traction Cities looking for resources on an Earth devastated millennia ago by the Sixty Minute War.
- The Tangled Lands, a collection of short stories by Paolo Bacigalupi and Tobias S. Buckell, references a lost city called Jhandpara that was once powered by magical means but became consumed by magic-seeking brambles.
- There are numerous floating habitats on the Venus-like planet Chilo in Tobias S. Buckell's novel Sly Mongoose. Buckell credits Geoffrey A. Landis with providing the background information on the floating cities.
- Saga of Seven Suns by Kevin J. Anderson has giant, occupied gas-mining platforms that mine the hydrogen necessary to, among other things, distill into ekti, a vital stardrive fuel.
- Charles Stross's novel Saturn's Children begins in a floating city on Venus.
- Geoffrey A. Landis's novel The Sultan of the Clouds features floating cities in the Venus atmosphere and orbital airships.
- Similar to the famous 1990s Mars trilogy about colonization and terraforming of Mars, Pamela Sargent wrote from 1986 to 2001 starting with Venus of Dreams a trilogy set on Venus where from cloud settlements a terraformed Venus is created.
- In Hannu Rajaniemi's novel The Quantum Thief, the Mars colony began as a slave-labor latifundium. After war developed, all entities began taking turns being the beings who kept the city rolling (and deflecting the permanent attack vectors that had been created during the war). The city kept rolling, with everyone's help.
- The War of Powers series by Robert E. Vardeman and Victor Milán features a Sky City ruled by a race of human overlords called the Sky born who conquered the city from its original reptilian inhabitants. The city is powered by dark magic and floats in a set pattern over 5 surface cities.
- The mobile floating pirate city-state of Armada in China Miéville's novel The Scar (2002) has accreted in the seas of Bas-Lag from multiple ships and boats over centuries of development.
- In Paul Stewart and Chris Riddell's The Edge Chronicles series, Sanctaphrax is a city-state built upon an enormous floating rock. It was the seat of knowledge and academia in The Edge. It was lost to Open Sky after its anchor-chain became un-tethered during a violent storm.
- In the Japanese manga series One Piece, an island known as Skypiea, originally believed to be a myth, resides far within the skies above the seas of the Grand Line.

=== Film ===
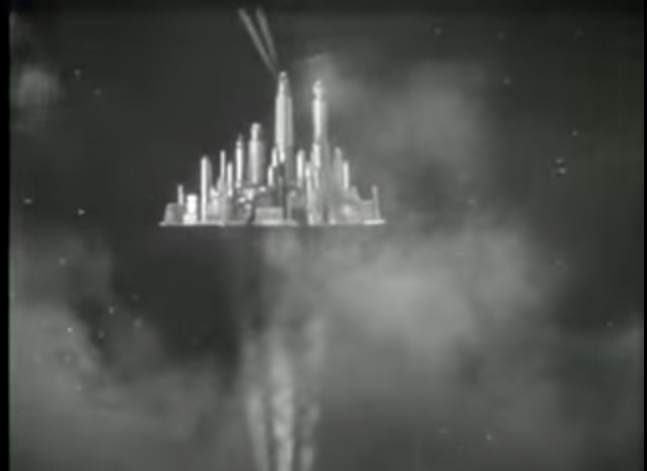
The Hawkmen's floating metropolis Sky City depicted in Flash Gordon (1936)

- In the 1936 film serial Flash Gordon, Prince Vultan and his winged Hawkmen dwell in Sky City, a metropolis that floats in the sky.
- The Castle in the Air from the animated film The Phantom Tollbooth (1970).
- Cloud City on the planet Bespin, in the Star Wars film The Empire Strikes Back (1980).
- Hayao Miyazaki's animated film Castle in the Sky (1986) involves a floating city hidden in the clouds called "Laputa", a name borrowed from Gulliver's Travels.
- In the anime film Steamboy (2004), a "Steam Castle" was shown, which was essentially a floating city, kept in the air by means of steam that was directed towards the soil.
- Metro City in the film Astro Boy (2009) is floating above the surface.
- In Avatar (2009), the Hallelujah Mountains are large floating islands that feature as a battlefield in the climax of the film.
- In the 2013 film Elysium, the wealthiest class of humanity lives in an advanced toroidal-shaped space station orbiting the Earth at a high altitude.
- The 2019 film Alita: Battle Angel based on the manga Gunnm by Yukito Kishiro involves a wealthy sky city named Zalem.

=== Television series ===
- Stratos, on the planet Ardana, is featured in the Star Trek episode "The Cloud Minders".
- In Firefly episode "Trash", the planet Bellerophon is the site of dozens of floating estates with "gracious living, ocean views and state-of-the-art security."
- Atlantis from the Stargate universe is a "city-ship" which is capable of flight and intergalactic travel. Due to the amount of power required to keep it airborne, it is frequently shown floating on water, but it could theoretically float at a fixed location in space. The Nox of Stargate SG-1 have floating cities.
- Airlandis in the animated television series Dragon Flyz (1996).
- Sky Realm in the animated television series Sky Dancers (1997).
- In the manga and anime series One Piece (1997-present), there are Sky Islands, cities built on a specific type of cloud that has hard, land-like properties, allowing civilizations to have ground to traverse and build on using the same cloud material, along with an ocean-like cloud throughout, making it a close parallel to a normal earthbound island. The islands are so rarely witnessed that the denizens of the Grand Line perceive them as a myth.
- Supertown is the floating city of the New Gods that appears in the Justice League (2001) episode "Twilight".
- The main setting in the 2004–2007 2D animated TV series Dragon Hunters and its 3D film prequel.
- The animated television show My Little Pony: Friendship Is Magic (2010–2019) depicts a city made entirely of clouds called Cloudsdale, which is home to the Pegasi and whose name is a pun on the Clydesdale horse breed.
- In the 2011 animated TV series ThunderCats, a race of Birdmen live above the clouds in a technological floating city named Avista, powered and suspended in mid-air by the Tech Stone, one of Mumm-Ra's four Power Stones.
- The anime television series Girls und Panzer (2012–2013) features "school ships": massive ships that contain a school campus and a town on their surface.
- In the animated web-series RWBY (2013), the city of Atlas floats directly over the city of Mantle. The power to make it float comes from the Relic of Creation, housed in a vault underneath the city.
- The animated series, She-Ra and the Princesses of Power (2018–2020), has the magical floating island Mystacor.
- The LEGO science-fantasy series Legends of Chima features Cavora, a floating mountain responsible for distributing elemental chi falls to the population below. Cavora used to be the base of the Phoenix Castle and was later pushed up as a result of the first Great Illumination. It also has a protective force field that repels intruders and sanctuary for the Legend Beasts, but the Crawlers have been able to bypass this and artificially block the falls.
- Cowboy Bebop, in the episode Waltz for Venus features floating islands of plants to terraform Venus.

=== Video games ===
- The game Deponia features a floating city known as Elysium.
- The skyborne metropolis of Caldoria in The Journeyman Project and its remake Pegasus Prime.
- In Minecraft, an alternate realm from the main game world can be accessed, known as the End. It is composed of islands of light yellow rock floating in a void, populated by gangly ominous-looking humanoid creatures called Endermen and cities in the outer regions. The Minecraft mod The Aether adds a new dimension of islands floating in the sky. A spinoff, Minecraft: Story Mode, features the titular Sky City in its 6th episode.
- Tales of Symphonia features a floating city named Exire, home to the outcast Half-Elves.
- The Karma mission in Call of Duty: Black Ops II takes place on a floating resort city called Colossus located near the Cayman Islands.
- Chrono Trigger features the Kingdom of Zeal, a floating island based magical kingdom, encountered in 12000 BCE.
- City in the Sky, the seventh dungeon level of The Legend of Zelda: Twilight Princess.
- Skyloft, the town in which The Legend of Zelda: Skyward Sword begins, is a landmass that was risen into the sky by the goddess Hylia to protect its residents from the demon Demise.
- The numerous sky islands in The Legend of Zelda: Tears of the Kingdom.
- Metroid Prime 3: Corruption features SkyTown, a research facility suspended within the atmosphere of a gas giant named Elysia.
- There are several floating cities in the games Skies of Arcadia and Skies of Arcadia Legends.
- In World of Warcraft, Dalaran is a major city that floats above Crystalsong Forest in the center of Northrend.
- The setting of the Eclipse Phase role-playing game includes floating cities on Venus and Saturn.
- Columbia, the setting for the game BioShock Infinite.
- Sonic the Hedgehog 3 and Sonic Adventure feature Angel Island, an island that floats using the power of the Master Emerald.
- Vane, the city of magicians in Lunar: Silver Star Harmony.
- Phantasy Star featured an Air Castle, home of the main villain.
- Final Fantasy features the Floating Castle, a floating city that resembles a space station.
- Final Fantasy V features a floating city named the Ronka Ruins.
- Final Fantasy XII has several in the form of solid earth islands suspended in the air by mystically charged stones inherent to the earth making up the foundation of the floating city, with Bhujerba being the only one visited and seen firsthand in the game.
- Final Fantasy XIV: Heavensward features several floating islands within the Sea of Clouds in Abalathia's Spine, the Churning Mists in Dravania, and the Allagan colony of Azys Lla, all of which feature current or historic human settlements.
- Sanctuary, the floating hub city of Borderlands 2.
- Glitzville, from Paper Mario: The Thousand-Year Door, is a small city that floats above Rogueport and its surrounding areas.
- The RPG Xenogears features a floating city-airship named Shevat.
- Xenoblade Chronicles is a science fiction role-playing video game for the Wii which features a floating city, Alcamoth.
- Tokyo Wakusei Planetokio is a science fiction adventure video game for the Sony PlayStation where the main action takes place in floating cities.
- Kimino Yusha is a science fiction role-playing video game for the Nintendo DS which features a floating land, Midalias.
- In RuneScape, each clan is assigned to a floating island built by Armadyl, called a "Clan Citadel".
- Cave Story is set entirely on a floating island.
- In LittleBigPlanet 3, Bunkum Lagoon is a floating city in the sky that is located on Planet Bunkum.
- In the Skylanders franchise, the world of Skylands consists of many floating islands.
- The game Project Nomads features a world of floating islands, one of which is controlled by the player.
- Fortnite's battle royale mode (2018) had a limited-time floating island held up by a giant purple cube that was powered by a crack in time. The cube later exploded, destroying the island.
- The academy faction towns in Heroes of Might and Magic V, are Magocracy-controlled floating cities known as the Silver Cities.
- Black Skylands is set in the fictional floating continent of Aspya.
- In Wolfenstein II: The New Colossus, the Nazis successfully established a floating city on top of a tall mountain, the city was abandoned after they were forced to pull their forces from America due to a revolution taking place.
- Apex Legends features a map named Olympus, a futuristic city flying high above the planet Psamathe.
- Various floating islands are featured in Genshin Impact. The most notable of these is Celestia (Chinese: 天空岛) which floats over Teyvat, and is said to be "the realm of the gods." The Hydro nation of Fontaine has its entire continental plate elevated well above the sea level of other nations. The "Dwelling in the Clouds" in Liyue, created by the adeptus Cloud Retainer, is able to float due to the unique properties of the mineral Plaustrite.
- The science-fantasy sandbox game ARK: Survival Evolved features floating islands on The Center, Crystal Isles, and many modded maps.
- Several floating islands generate in each world in the game Terraria.
- Small floating islands are featured in the game Botanica on the planet with the same name.
- The Legend of Heroes: Trails in the Sky SC features an ancient floating city, Liber Ark, as the final dungeon of the game.
- In the RPG series Ys, the second game in its franchise takes place in a floating island who also shares the same name of Ys.

=== Other ===
- Franklin Booth's Unseen Foundations (1925) and his illustrations for James Whitcomb Riley's Flying Islands in the Night (1913).
- M.C. Escher's engraving Luchtkasteel (1928).
- René Magritte's painting Le Château des Pyrénées (1959).
- Moebius' art book Venise céleste (1984).
- The sky island of Doctor Einmug whom Mickey Mouse meets in comic strips.
- In one comic story Scrooge McDuck finds a floating island by watching satellite images.
- The webcomic Dresden Codak includes the city of Nephilopolis, a city constructed in the wreckage of a giant floating ancient robot.
- A flying island appears in the music videos for the Gorillaz songs "Feel Good Inc." and "El Mañana", where it is shot down by helicopters. It then reappears, partially repaired, in the music video for the song "DoYaThing".
- Floating Islands frequently appear in the work of Roger Dean. One example is the album cover for An Evening of Yes Music Plus.
- The crashed remains of the flying city-state of Aeor appear in Campaign two of the web series Critical Role, and the City of Avalir appears as the main setting for the limited campaign Exandria Unlimited: Calamity.
- The Udara Air Realm at Lost Island Theme Park is based around a society of inventors that once lived on Tana'hewa, a floating city above Lost Island that crashed to the surface, with the stranded survivors trying to re-develop their technology to return to the skies once again.
- Skyrealms of Jorune (1984) is a roleplaying game which features as its main setting the 'Skyrealms' - floating "islands" levitated by mysterious crystals in the crust of an alien planet.

== See also ==
- Aerospace architecture
- Cloud Nine (tensegrity sphere)
- Very large floating structure
- World Turtle
- Tripura (mythology)
- Kalakeyas
