= A Minecraft Movie Squared =

Upcoming film by Jared Hess

- Promotional logo
- Directed by: Jared Hess
- Screenplay by: Jared Hess; Chris Galletta
- Based on: Minecraft by Mojang Studios
- Produced by: Mary Parent; Cale Boyter; Roy Lee; Eric McLeod; Jason Momoa; Kayleen Walters; Torfi Frans Olafsson; Susan Purcell
- Starring: Jason Momoa; Jack Black; Kirsten Dunst; Danielle Brooks; Matt Berry; Jennifer Coolidge
- Cinematography: Fabian Wagner
- Production companies: Legendary Pictures; Vertigo Entertainment; On the Roam; Mojang Studios; Xbox Pictures
- Distributed by: Warner Bros. Pictures
- Release date: July 23, 2027
- Countries: United States; Sweden
- Language: English

A Minecraft Movie Squared is an upcoming adventure comedy film based on the 2011 video game Minecraft by Mojang Studios. The sequel to A Minecraft Movie (2025), it is directed by Jared Hess from a screenplay he co-wrote with Chris Galletta. Jason Momoa, Jack Black, Danielle Brooks, Matt Berry, and Jennifer Coolidge all return from the first film, with Kirsten Dunst joining the cast.

Discussions of a potential sequel to A Minecraft Movie began a few days after that film's release in April 2025. That October, the sequel was officially announced with Hess returning to direct and Galletta returning to co-write the screenplay. Dunst was cast in the role of Alex in March 2026. Filming began in May in New Zealand, with the title being announced during Minecraft Live on May 30, 2026.

A Minecraft Movie Squared is scheduled to be released in the United States on July 23, 2027, by Warner Bros. Pictures.

== Cast ==
- Jason Momoa as Garrett "The Garbage Man" Garrison, a video game store owner and former video game champion
- Jack Black as Steve, a former doorknob salesman who spent years living in the Overworld. He now runs a chicken truck.
- Kirsten Dunst as Alex, the new owner of Steve's former home. Dunst replaces Kate McKinnon and Alice May Connolly, who voiced and portrayed her respectively in the first film's post-credits scene.
- Danielle Brooks as Dawn, a mobile petting zoo owner who owns Steve's former pet wolf from the Overworld, Dennis
- Matt Berry as an unknown new character. Berry voiced the villager character Nitwit in the previous film.
- Jennifer Coolidge as Marlene, the vice principal of Chuglass High School who is having a romantic affair with the villager

== Production ==
=== Development ===
Talks for a potential sequel to A Minecraft Movie began a few days after the film's release in April 2025. In an interview with Variety, Legendary Entertainment's Chairman of Worldwide Production Mary Parent explained how the movie earned the "A" in its title, stating that "we're calling it 'A Minecraft Movie' because we're respecting the fact that there's no one story that drives the game". Director Jared Hess also included that the film is "not the official story" and that it is "just one of a zillion stories". In another interview, Hess expressed interest in making a sequel, noting the world's use of infinite mods, characters, and biomes, outlining how Minecraft is virtually endless. On April 11, Warner Bros. Pictures reported that a sequel was in early development. At the end of a behind-the-scenes interview of the first film, the VFX supervisor Sheldon Stopsack and the animation supervisor Kevin Estey both refer to the film's sequel as Another Minecraft Movie. The sequel was officially announced in October 2025, with a release date of July 23, 2027. Hess was announced to return as director, while Chris Galletta would return to write the script with Hess. At CinemaCon in April 2026, the film was listed as A Minecraft Sequel. In a Minecraft Live presentation on May 30, 2026, the title A Minecraft Movie Squared was announced.

=== Casting ===
In January 2026, Jason Momoa revealed that he would be returning for the sequel. In March 2026, Jack Black, Danielle Brooks, Jennifer Coolidge, and Matt Berry were also reported to be returning from the first movie. Kirsten Dunst joined the cast as Alex, replacing Kate McKinnon from the first film's post-credits scene. Months prior, Dunst had spoken publicly about wanting to join the Minecraft film series as her children were fans of the game and first film.

It was revealed during Minecraft Live in May that Matt Berry, who previously voiced Nitwit in the first film, was cast to play an unknown new character. Despite his role being unconfirmed, he was rumoured to be in talks to portray an antagonistic character, which sparked speculations on who he would play. It is heavily theorised and speculated that Berry, who was originally supposed to portray Steve in A Minecraft Movie before scheduling conflicts caused by the 2023 Hollywood labor disputes forced him to back out and have the role recast with Black, could play Herobrine, a fan-made character from creepypastas and urban legends depicting an eldritch force resembling a sinister Steve, though this remains unconfirmed. Sam Hargrave from The Direct suggested that if A Minecraft Movie Squared succeeds and a "trilogy-capping third movie" follows, Herobrine could serve as "the perfect final foe. Perhaps Berry's mystery role in the upcoming flick could tease a future as Herobrine, but then again, he could just as easily simply be voicing the Ender Dragon."

=== Filming ===
In January 2026, Momoa stated that principal photography was scheduled to begin in late April 2026. Production was underway by May, and a first look at filming, which took place in New Zealand, was shown at Warner Bros. Discovery's annual upfronts presentation. Filming took place across various locations around New Zealand such as Huntly, Thames and Auckland. Soundstage work took place at Auckland Film Studios.

== Release ==
A Minecraft Movie Squared is scheduled to be released in the United States on July 23, 2027, by Warner Bros. Pictures.

== See also ==
- List of films based on video games
