= Crystal Rain =

2006 novel by Tobias S. Buckell

- First edition
- Author: Tobias S. Buckell
- Illustrator: Jeffrey L. Ward
- Cover artist: Todd Lockwood
- Language: English
- Genre: Science fiction, fantasy
- Publisher: Tor Books
- Publication date: February 7, 2006
- Publication place: United States
- Media type: Hardcover
- Pages: 352
- ISBN: 0-7653-1227-1
- Followed by: Ragamuffin

Crystal Rain (2006) is the debut novel of Caribbean writer Tobias S. Buckell. Buckell calls it his "Caribbean steampunk novel". Although Crystal Rain is a stand-alone novel, Buckell's books Ragamuffin (2007) and Sly Mongoose (2008) are set in the same universe with some recurring characters.

The book was the third runner up for the Locus Award for Best First Novel 2007 awards.

The book has received several reviews.

The novel is set on Nanagadahoodababa, a planet far from Earth.
