= Ragamuffin (novel) =

2007 novel by Tobias S. Buckell

- First edition
- Author: Tobias S. Buckell
- Cover artist: Todd Lockwood
- Language: English
- Genre: Science fiction
- Publisher: Tor Books
- Publication date: June 12, 2007
- Publication place: United States
- Media type: Hardcover
- Pages: 320 pp
- ISBN: 0-7653-1507-6
- OCLC: 84904012
- Dewey Decimal: 813/.54 22
- LC Class: PS3602.U2635 R34 2007
- Preceded by: Crystal Rain
- Followed by: Sly Mongoose

Ragamuffin is the second novel by Caribbean science fiction writer Tobias S. Buckell. It is the sequel to his first novel, Crystal Rain.

Buckell labeled Ragamuffin a "Caribbean space opera", with his previous novel being called "Caribbean steampunk". It is followed by his third novel, Sly Mongoose.

Ragamuffin was nominated for the 2007 Nebula Award for Best Novel and was a finalist for the 2008 Prometheus Award.

It has received several reviews.
