= Verity (web series) =

2026 horror web series

- An illustration of the character Verity
- Genre: Horror
- Created by: ThatMob
- Voices of: ThatMob
- Country of origin: Canada
- Original language: English
- No. of episodes: 3

Production
- Running time: 20–24 minutes

Original release
- Network: YouTube
- Release: May 30 – July 8, 2026

Verity is a 2026 Canadian animated horror web series created by YouTuber ThatMob and set within the sandbox video game Minecraft. In the series ThatMob encounters a virtual assistant named Verity, who eventually turns into a monster. After the series released, another YouTuber named HorrorSkunx created a song titled "It's Me, It's Verity", based on the series. The series and the song became the subject of an internet meme popular among Generation Alpha.

== Plot ==
ThatMob receives what is presented as a custom Minecraft modification he is sent through a Discord message. After he installs the mod, a shaking, shouting carboard box appears in his Minecraft world, and after interacting with it the box opens to reveal Verity, what seems to be a virtual assistant resembling a yellow smiley face. Verity presents itself as a friendly AI, telling ThatMob's self-insert protagonist to ask it anything as it "knows everything." ThatMob initially uses Verity as a databank of Minecraft information, able to pinpoint the location of diamonds in his copy of the game among other things, as he believes Verity to be a helpful, harmless mod that is working as intended. Verity begins reciting details about ThatMob's personal life, knowledge that should be inaccessible to it in-game, as well as suggesting ThatMob not go to any in-game villages as they would probably be empty of non-player characters (NPCs) to interact with, and ThatMob began to feel suspicious of Verity's motives.

Verity becomes increasingly unsettling, maniacal, and even aggressive toward both NPCs and other players as it attempts to obtain Mob's undivided attention. It eventually transforms into a hostile lanky and yellow humanoid monster and attacks ThatMob, but he escapes from Verity, runs back to the house, and tells Verity's smiley form that he came back for it. He promises Verity that he won't leave again, and everything appears to go back to normal.

However, ThatMob decides to get rid of Verity after all, and invites his friend Twixxel to the server to help. Suspecting that ThatMob and Twixxel are planning to get rid of it, Verity kills Twixxel in-game. However, when ThatMob reaches out to Twixxel on Discord, the lack of response implies that Verity actually killed Twixxel in real life as well. ThatMob finds a secret laboratory revealing that people have been attempting to handle Verity for a long time, and Verity uses its talent for mimicry to imitate the dead Twixxel's voice in a wildly unsuccessful attempt to cheer up the protagonist.

ThatMob puts Verity inside a machine to send it away, but the machine fails, and the horrific humanoid Verity escapes through a window. Suddenly returning to its harmless form, Verity tells ThatMob it was sincere when it said the machine only "went one way." ThatMob says he was trying to send Verity "back home," but it explains that even if the plan worked, it would still be in his other technology; it just prefers Minecraft to interact with him. Verity threatens him with sharing Twixxel's fate, and ThatMob begs it to leave him alone, which Verity refuses. After that, Verity talks about its past and reveals to ThatMob that it has existed for over 100 years—it says it is alone and has no real friends as every human it meets leaves, as Verity was "always close enough to know [it] was useful until [it] wasn't"—and ThatMob pulls out a gun, something out of place in a typical Minecraft game, and aims it at Verity who taunts him to shoot as it won't kill him anyway. As ThatMob despairs over being stuck with Verity forever, Verity cheerfully says they can do it together, and in response, ThatMob shoots himself in the head.

After ThatMob's story ends, Grox, another YouTuber, discovers a familiar cardboard box containing Verity.

== Cast ==
- JustWhispy as Verity™, an Artificial Intelligence, the main antagonist, and the eponym for the title.
- ThatMob as himself, the main protagonist, who discovers Verity.
- Twixxel_lesgo as himself, the person that ThatMob invited to his server; he also planned to get rid of Verity.
- itsfilsfr as Verity helpline employee
- GroxMC as Grox, who finds Verity after ThatMob dies.

== Episode overview ==
No.	Title	Release dates
1	"Something is Knocking at Your Door..."	May 30, 2026
2	"Something is Inside Your House..."	June 12, 2026
3	"Something Won't Let You Leave..."	July 8, 2026

The three episodes were later assembled into VERITY [FULL MINECRAFT MOVIE], which ThatMob released on July 12, 2026.

== Production and style ==
The Verity YouTube series was created by ThatMob, someone who creates horror films in Minecraft. Verity was released in May 2026, with the series concluding that July. The series uses the game both as its setting and as a virtual film set. Nyla Gilbert of Den of Geek placed Verity within a wider increase in Minecraft role-playing stories and narrative short films. Gilbert argued that the game's limited facial animation makes vocal cues and body movement important to storytelling, while its customizable environments allow independent creators to construct detailed settings without conventional animation software.

Commentators also connected Verity with contemporary concerns about artificial intelligence. Stephen Johnson of Lifehacker described the contrast between the character's helpful behavior and its concealed threat, and suggested that its popularity could reflect unease about increasingly capable AI assistants.

== Reception and legacy ==
=== Fan media and popularity ===
YouTuber HorrorSkunx created a song and accompanying music video called "It's Me, It's Verity" based on the series. Its blithe reception inspired many fan-created songs and music videos to follow it based on variants of Verity after Horror Skunx published more songs, and these songs became a sensation on short-form content sites like TikTok, Instagram, and YouTube Shorts. Multiple Minecraft mods have been created to bring Verity into the game, three of which have received official support from ThatMob. The original series by ThatMob and the original music video by Horror Skunx have each surpassed thirty million views, and several Minecraft mods have received millions of downloads. As part of an internet meme that gained popularity among Generation Alpha, yellow smiley faces and words ending with the suffix -ity trigger associations with Verity and the Verity song.

Coincidentally, an unrelated thriller film called Verity began promotion around the same time, prompting memes from fans. In a September 2026 short-form promotional video for the film, lead actress Anne Hathaway referenced Horror Skunx's song "It's Me, It's Verity" lyrics. According to Google search trends, Verity was among the "top trending costumes" for Halloween in October 2026.

PCGamesN listed the Verity mod created by the user PnTMC as one of the best Minecraft mods.

In August 2026, Lifehacker included Verity in a weekly column about current youth-culture trends.

=== Critical analysis ===
Natasha Hinde of HuffPost classified the Verity meme as brain rot akin to Ballerina Cappuccina. Owen Carry of USA Today said that Verity "could be the new '6-7'", and attributed its popularity to a "corporate horror" trend among youth, which includes the Backrooms and the YouTube series Skibidi Toilet. He also connected the series to fears surrounding AI, comparing Verity to the shoggoth, a Lovecraftian monster often depicted hiding behind a smiley face as a metaphor for AI and he also compared Verity to Clippy, a discontinued virtual assistant for Microsoft Office. Nyla Gilbert of Den of Geek attributed its popularity to a trend towards independent and interactive media, which Minecraft as a medium facilitates. She compared the character of Verity to Nikki Freeman from the 2025 horror film Obsession.

== See also ==
- Herobrine – Minecraft creepypasta
- List of Internet phenomena
- Artificial consciousness
