= Herobrine =

Minecraft urban legend

- Minecraft character
- An in-game render of Herobrine
- Based on: Steve

In-universe information
- Gender: Male

Herobrine is an urban legend and creepypasta from the sandbox video game Minecraft. He is often depicted as a version of the Minecraft character Steve, but with solid white eyes that lack pupils, and behavior that primarily involves destroying the player's world. The story originated from an anonymous post on 4chan's /v/ board in 2010, where the author reported encountering a strange figure in a single-player world, followed by their messages being deleted when they attempted to talk to other players about the sighting. The story was further popularized after livestreamers Copeland and Patimuss created their own versions.

Herobrine has become a popular part of the online culture surrounding Minecraft, as well as effectively an internet meme. Interest in the character inspired many to create their own stories and alleged sightings centered around Herobrine, as well as create Minecraft mods that add him to the game. Interest in the character continued into the 2020s, leading to the rediscovery of formerly lost media related to the original sightings. Herobrine has been considered one of the most notable legends in video games, with his popularity leading to him ranking on a Guinness World Records poll for the best video game villains despite never truly existing within Minecraft. The character has been referenced several times by the developers of Minecraft, appearing on official artwork as well.

== Origins and characteristics ==
The screenshot provided in the original Herobrine sighting, posted to 4chan in 2010. Herobrine can be spotted in the fog to the left of the hill.

In 2010, during Minecraft's alpha stage of development, an anonymous post was made on 4chan's /v/ board, where the author claimed to encounter a mysterious entity while playing the game. The post claimed that shortly after starting a new world, the author saw what they believed to be a cow in the distance, which they approached in order to kill it. Upon approaching it, they instead saw a second player character with solid white eyes staring at them from the fog before vanishing. After the encounter, the author noticed numerous strange structures that they did not create. They claimed that when trying to contact other players about the event, they found their posts removed, eventually receiving a message from a user named "Herobrine" that simply said "stop". The anonymous post went on to claim that other players informed him that Herobrine was the alias of the brother of Notch, the creator of Minecraft. The 4chan post claimed that Notch said, in response to queries about whether he had a brother, "I did, but he is no longer with us."

Around the same time, another anonymous post on 4chan wrote about another entity the author seemingly encountered in a cave after listening to the in-game music disc "13", which also had white eyes that lurked in the fog. This encounter was simply named "White Eyes", and was believed to be related to Herobrine. Shortly after the original stories were published, livestreamers Copeland and Patimuss, the former of which saw and liked the original posts, staged Herobrine encounters of their own. In Copeland's stream, he played in a survival world with a custom texture pack for around two hours while working on a house. After entering a room he was planning on furnishing, he saw Herobrine staring at him and he quickly left the house and exited the game, before ending the livestream. This encounter was created by Copeland modifying in-game textures to make Herobrine appear. Copeland would then claim that his computer crashed when attempting to go live again. Afterwards, viewers of the livestream were directed to a webpage with the title "him.html". The page featured a GIF depicting Herobrine with moving, realistic eyes, along with text that wrote about how the reader was "living in a fantasy world inside their mind" and needed to "wake up". This granted Herobrine the additional nickname of "HIM". In Patimuss' stream, he encountered Herobrine walking on lava while playing the game, before promptly shutting the game down.

After these streams, the popularity of Herobrine spread across the Minecraft community, with people creating their own alleged sightings, as well as developing Minecraft mods to add the character to the game themselves. Most claimed sightings of Herobrine are accompanied by red text annotations and eerie music. In stories and mods centered around Herobrine, he is typically summoned through the creation of a structure made up of gold and other in-game materials. His most common traits include constructing abnormal structures and causing destruction, such as by digging random tunnels throughout the world and removing the leaves from trees.

== Reception and legacy ==
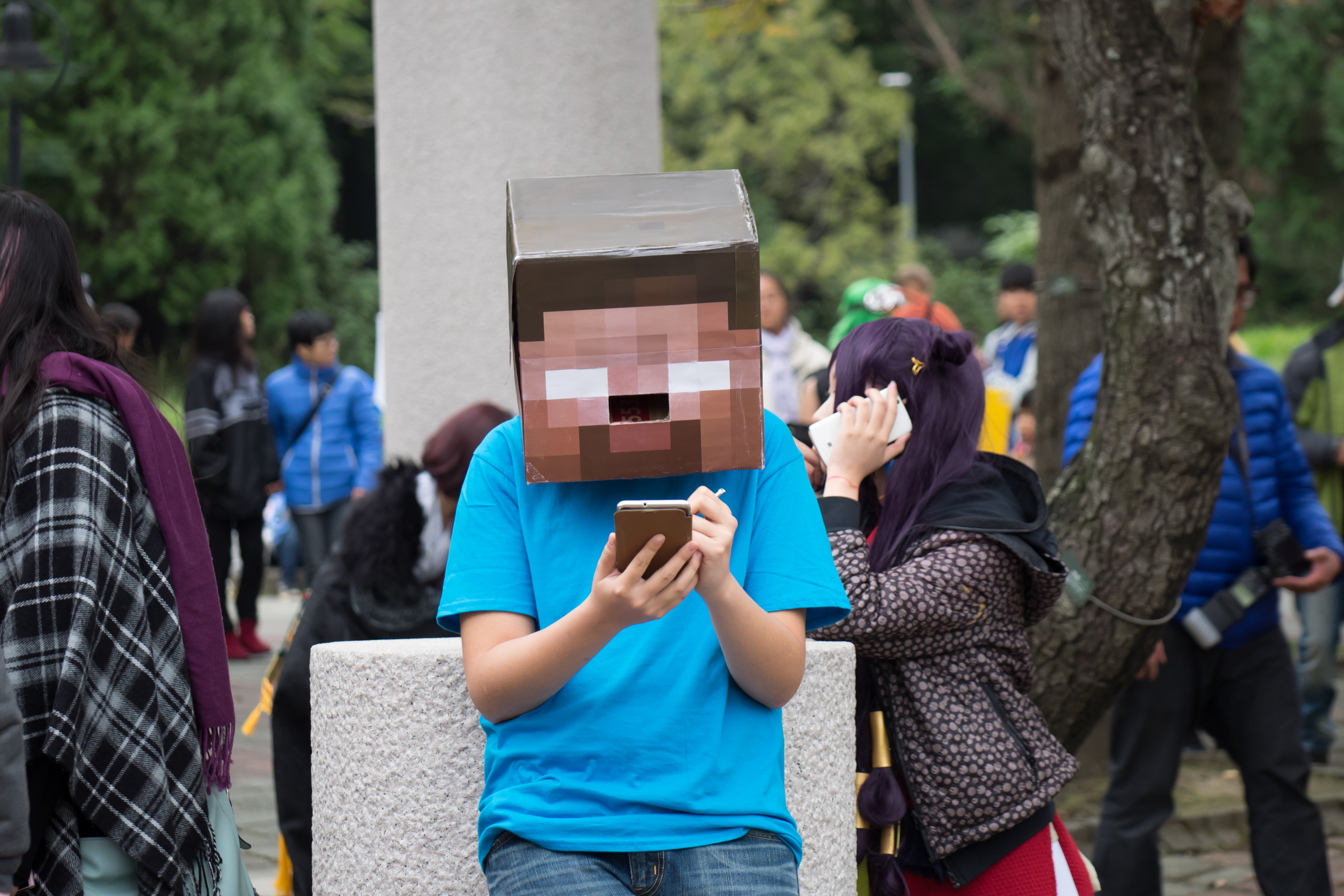
A cosplayer wearing a Herobrine mask

Herobrine gained widespread popularity in the 2010s, becoming a notable part of the Minecraft community and an internet meme. Several other Minecraft creepypastas have been created by fans, such as Entity 303, though none were able to reach similar levels of notoriety as Herobrine. VG247 writer Nadia Oxford described Herobrine as one of the best Minecraft fan works, and IGN writer Paul Dean wrote Herobrine to be the "most popular example of a game haunting ever." Lauren Morton of PC Gamer wrote that, despite Herobrine never having truly existed, the character "lives on in the minds of plenty of Minecraft players" who were interested in him when younger. Gabriel Menotti cited Herobrine as an example of how user-generated recordings for video games could change player's imaginations, and view the game beyond its original scope.

Some players believed Herobrine to be real despite the character never existing, which caused employees of Mojang to comment on the character. Notch in particular has denied the existence of Herobrine numerous times, and tweeted that he never had a brother in 2011. Despite this, Mojang has made many references to Herobrine; in numerous versions of Minecraft, the update logs have included the term "Removed Herobrine" as a joke. "We don't usually talk about Herobrine," Minecraft lead designer Jens "Jeb" Bergensten told G1. "It's a mystery [...] And we don't quite confirm if it's true or false." Minecraft director Agnes Larsson added that a creature in the game called the Warden takes inspiration from the community's horror "myths". In A Minecraft Movie (2025), a film adaptation of Minecraft, a scene depicts Steve (portrayed by Jack Black) with glowing white eyes, during a hallucination from an enderman. This scene was widely interpreted by fans as a reference to Herobrine, although creative director Torfi Frans Olafsson stated that the white eyes were actually a visual effects glitch that was left in due to time constraints. Several viewed this as an ironic coincidence due to Herobrine's nature as a figure that haunts the game and does not truly exist.

In 2013, Herobrine ranked 46th on a poll for the Top 50 Video Game Villains of All Time, which was organized by Guinness World Records. Fan-made books based on Herobrine have been published, such as The Legend of Herobrine. In 2020, a Minecraft player known as Enderboss25 gained contact with Copeland in an effort to recover the footage of the original livestream that caused Herobrine's popularity. While the original footage was long gone, the original world file was recovered, and a recreation of the livestream was made in a joint effort by the two. Similarly, in 2021, continued interest in the story resulted in the world seed of the original Herobrine sighting being discovered by a group of players known as the Minecraft@Home project. In July 2024, the original livestream was uploaded to YouTube by user brutallillfjomp, who had saved the stream in 2010 and was unaware that it was considered lost until watching a video on it the previous day.

== See also ==
- Verity (web series)
