= The Aether (video game mod) =

2011 Minecraft mod

- View of the Aether dimension, consisting of islands floating in mid-air
- Developer: The Aether Team
- Release: 22 July 2011
- Written in: Java
- Engine: Minecraft
- Available in: 39 languages
- License: Code – LGPL-3.0; Assets – All rights reserved
- Repository: The Aether – GitHub; The Aether II – GitHub

The Aether is a Minecraft mod originally released by a team of six modders. The mod adds a new Heaven-like dimension to Minecraft, complete with new materials, mobs, dungeons and bosses. The mod was released on 22 July 2011 and received acclaim, with the lead developer being hired at Mojang Studios. A sequel to the mod was released in June 2013.

== Gameplay ==
The Aether mod adds a new eponymous dimension to Minecraft. The dimension's pastel aesthetics and floating islands contrast the Nether, a dimension from the base game themed after Hell. The Aether is accessed by building, activating and going through the Aether portal, constructed in the same shape as the Nether portal but with different materials (glowstone replacing the obsidian, water replacing the fire). The dimension is made out of islands floating in mid-air; falling down sends the player out of the dimension. Various friendly and hostile mobs can be encountered in the Aether. Overworld tools become obsolete in the Aether, requiring the player to make tools out of new materials found inside the dimension, effectively restarting the progression chain. The mod also adds accessories, which provide buffs to a player when placed in a specific inventory slot. Dungeons can be found in the Aether, containing a boss at the end that drops valuable items upon defeat.

== Development ==
As of June 2013, the mod team had seven members: project lead Brandon "kingbdogz" Pearce, programmers Jaryt and Saspiron, artists Dark and Katie Payn, composer Emile van Krieken and writer Liberty.

In December 2021, The Aether was updated to support newer Minecraft versions.

In June 2013, The Aether 2 was announced, a mod that aims to overhaul The Aether and add new content as well as a multiplayer party system, designed to make cooperative play more convenient. An alpha release was made public in March 2026.

An official Bedrock Edition port of The Aether released on 14 July 2026 via the Minecraft Marketplace, developed in collaboration with Spark Universe. Team lead Katie Payn stated that the port won't be identical to the Java Edition original, as the two editions have vastly different architectures.

== Reception ==
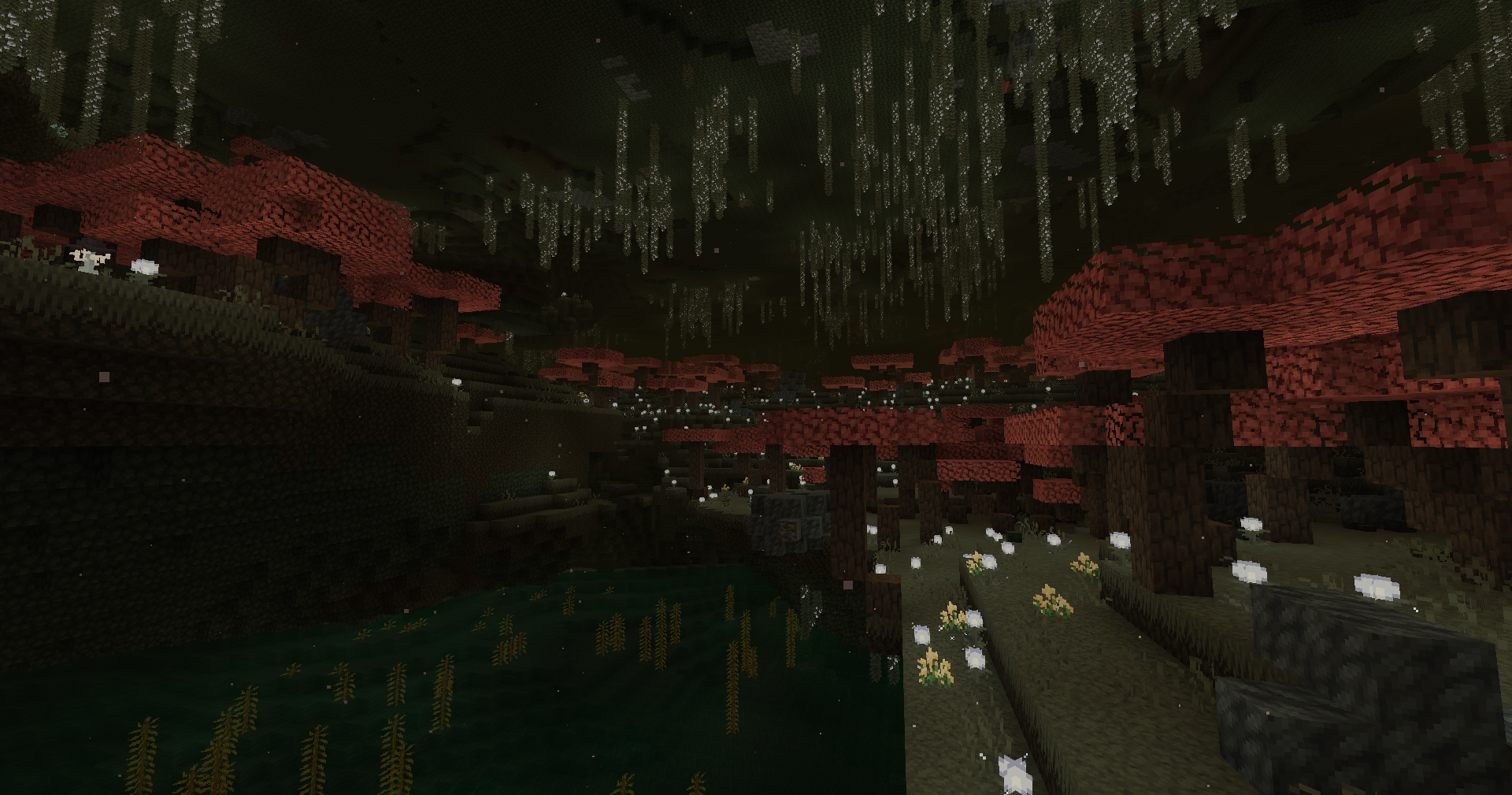
The Aether inspired similar large-scale dimension mods, such as The Undergarden (pictured).

Being one of the first large-scale mods for Minecraft, The Aether has received acclaim and is considered a classic. PCGamesN called the mod "one of Minecraft's most impressive historic mods". Various news outlets described the mod's themes as antithetical to the Nether. In January 2020, Pearce became a Mojang Studios employee.
