= Steve (Minecraft) =

Video game character

- Minecraft character
- Official promotional art for Steve
- First appearance: Minecraft (2011)
- Created by: Markus Persson
- Portrayed by: Jack Black (A Minecraft Movie)

In-universe information
- Related: Alex (feminine counterpart)

Steve is a player character from Minecraft, a 2011 sandbox game by Mojang Studios. Created by Swedish video game developer Markus "Notch" Persson and introduced in the original 2009 Java-based version, Steve is the first and the original default skin available for players of contemporary versions of Minecraft. Steve lacks an official backstory as he is intended to be a customizable player avatar as opposed to being a predefined character. His feminine counterpart, Alex, was introduced in August 2014 for Java PC versions of Minecraft, with seven other characters debuting in the Java edition of the game in October 2022. Depending on the version of Minecraft, players have a choice of defaulting to either Steve or any other variant skins when creating a new account. However, the skin is easy to change from the game itself or website.

Steve became a widely recognized character in the video game industry following the critical and commercial success of the Minecraft franchise. Considered by critics as a mascot for the Minecraft intellectual property, his likeness has appeared in advertising and merchandise, including apparel and collectible items. In October 2020, Steve was added as a playable character to Super Smash Bros. Ultimate, where he is commonly ranked as the game's best character and has sparked controversy due to his imbalanced power, leading to him being frequently banned from several tournaments for the game. He was portrayed by Jack Black in the film adaptation A Minecraft Movie, released in April 2025. Steve's design has additionally been used in unofficial media, such as the "Herobrine" creepypasta.

== Concept and design ==
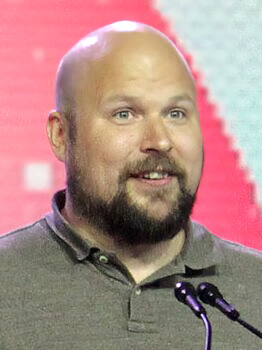
Markus Persson, the original developer of Minecraft and creator of Steve, in 2016

Steve was designed by game creator Markus Persson for Minecraft. He is a human character with a blocky appearance, which is consistent with the aesthetic and art style of the game. His design consists of a light blue top, a pair of blue trousers, and shoes, while his face is sometimes adorned with a goatee. In the console editions, Steve is presented in different outfits, such as a tuxedo, a prison jumpsuit, and a kilt. (Note: A distinction is made between the differences of the two different editions of Minecraft. This article refers to the game on consoles and smartphones where customization of skins is limited to skins that exist in the virtual store. This is in contrast with the Windows, Linux, and Macintosh versions where skins are completely customizable, as users may upload image files to Mojang.) While the name Steve originated as a joke due to Persson thinking it was "generic", the name was adopted by the community and became official in the Bedrock Edition of Minecraft. In spite of his masculine name and features, Steve's gender was never meant to be specific. In 2012, Persson explained that Minecraft's blocky graphics reinforced the "[traditionally] masculine" aesthetic of the game. He emphasized that Minecraft was designed to be an inclusive game where "gender doesn't exist" and that the character model was supposed to be a genderless human being. Admitting that limiting the gender options to just male would insinuate that Minecraft was a "boy game only", Persson said he once attempted to create a proper female character in Minecraft but said the final results had been "extremely sexist." To keep the game gender-neutral, Steve's goatee was removed in 2009 but has since been readded to his character.

From left to right: Sunny, Kai, Makena, Steve, Alex, Zuri, Efe, Ari, and Noor

Alex, another complimentary default skin for all players, was added on 22 August 2014, to the Java Edition. The character was added to the console and mobile versions at a later date. Alex's character model is similar to Steve's but with a more feminine appearance: her orange hair is tied into a ponytail, and she has narrower arms. Commenting on Minecraft's campaign for better gender representation compared to other video games, Helen Chiang, the Microsoft studio head responsible for the Minecraft franchise, explained in a 2018 interview that it is important for her company to use the Minecraft brand as a tool to subvert gender stereotypes. By presenting Alex and Steve with similar abilities or qualities, Chiang said it would reinforce the studio's stance on gender equality. In 2014, an update to Minecraft added the ability for skins to have multiple layers, which allowed for more detail.

In August 2022, an update implemented redesigns for Steve and Alex, using multiple layers and more texturing. Steve's redesign restored his goatee, which had been removed thirteen years prior. In October of the same year, seven default skins were added to Minecraft using the existing Steve and Alex character models to increase diversity within the game's community. These skins were named Noor, Sunny, Ari, Zuri, Makena, Kai, and Efe.

== Description ==
=== Character overview ===
Steve is one of nine default character skins that are available to new players of Minecraft. A skin is the appearance of the player's avatar that represents the player in the game world, which can be changed, altered, or replaced by the player. Players are allowed multiple options to change the visual appearance of their player character's skin.

Prior to Alex's introduction, Steve was the only official skin available to players on the PC and mobile editions of the game, though players of the PC version could use skins they have designed themselves or found online. On the original console editions of the game, up to eight male variants of Steve were also offered, none of them female, in addition to a greater variety of characters that could be purchased from bundles. Like Steve, Alex initially could not be selected in these console versions, and the skin chosen is randomly assigned whenever players start a new game. As of 2022, Steve, Alex, and the other seven default skins can be manually selected in all versions of the game, either via an in-game menu or in the game launcher, depending on the version of Minecraft being played.

=== A Minecraft Movie ===
Steve as he appears in A Minecraft Movie (2025), portrayed by Jack Black

Steve appeared in the film adaptation of the game, A Minecraft Movie (2025), wherein he was portrayed in live action by American actor Jack Black. Originally, Black was intended to play as a talking pig, before the then-director felt that a host was needed for the other characters present in the film. He was also the actor who was the most invested into the game. During production, the crew set up private Minecraft servers for everyone to play on; Black played over 100 hours of the game on those servers, more than anyone else, before he was cast as Steve. Following the original intent for Steve to be a default character that anyone can modify, the film's depiction of Steve is Jack Black's own interpretation of Steve.

In the film, Steve was a struggling doorknob salesman who comes into contact with a mysterious object in a cave and is transported to the "Overworld"—a magical world made out of blocks and the main setting for the film. From there, he becomes the leader for the other main characters of the film. In addition, Black performed numerous diegetic songs for the film. This includes "I Feel Alive"—an original song in the movie based on Steve's character—and "Steve's Lava Chicken", the latter of which became the shortest song to reach the UK singles chart. Alex appears in the post-credits scene, where she appears to have taken residence in Steve's house in his absence, and invites him in to discuss the chest in the attic. Kate McKinnon makes an uncredited cameo as the voice of Alex, while Alice May Connolly serves as her physical actor. Kirsten Dunst will play her in the 2027 sequel, A Minecraft Movie Squared.

=== Other appearances ===
Both Steve and Alex are skins in Minecraft Dungeons, with Steve being the most popular skin among players. Outside of the Minecraft series, Steve appears as a playable character in the PC version of Super Meat Boy, in which he is referred to as "Mr. Minecraft". Steve also appears a playable character in Super Smash Bros. Ultimate, wherein Alex and some enemies from Minecraft are featured as alternate costumes. Cosmetics based on Steve's head appear in Hybrid. Steve and Alex also appear as playable characters via downloadable content in Sonic Racing: CrossWorlds.

== Reception ==
=== Cultural impact ===
Critics believe Steve has achieved a level of cultural impact and viral recognition outside of the character's origin as a baseline for new players of Minecraft. He has been considered the face of the franchise in promotional and advertising materials; some commentators consider Steve to be the closest character Minecraft has to a protagonist or main character. This is in spite of the fact that his existence is not asserted by way of an official backstory or in-game dialogue unlike most other video game characters. Steve has been considered one of the most iconic video game characters by the publication staff of Glixel and GamesRadar+, with the latter considering Steve to be the "enduring symbol" of Minecraft and his character model as one of the most recognizable silhouettes in video game culture. In 2024, a poll conducted by BAFTA with around 4,000 respondents named Steve as the thirteenth most iconic video-game character of all time.

Steve has been the subject of multiple fan theories spread across Internet communities. One theory alleged that Steve is based on Tommy Vercetti, the protagonist of Grand Theft Auto: Vice City, due to the physical resemblance between the characters. It relied on a 2009 Tumblr post by Persson about Minecraft's development progress, where he confirmed that he used designs inspired by the Grand Theft Auto games. In 2020, Persson responded on social media and denied any connections between both characters, though he stated he had a subconscious connection due to him being a fan of Vice City. In 2010, Herobrine, a creepypasta that is a derivative design of Steve with white, solid eyes, was created on 4chan, gaining prominence amongst the Minecraft community and becoming an internet meme, being featured in some official artwork for the game as well. Conversely, the portrayal of Steve by Jack Black in A Minecraft Movie became the subject of memes as well due to its live-action depiction.

=== Super Smash Bros. Ultimate ===
The announcement and introduction of Minecraft-themed downloadable content (DLC) for Super Smash Bros. Ultimate, which is primarily represented by Steve, was received positively from critics and players. Some commentators suggested that much of the excitement was due to the character's unprecedented inclusion into Ultimate; after the reveal, social media website Twitter struggled with posts generated in response. Ultimate's director Masahiro Sakurai tweeted "Perhaps Twitter has fallen ...?" once Twitter's services came back online. Patricia Hernandez of Polygon and Nadia Fox of US Gamer noticed a suggestive animation featured at the character's win screen, which generated more publicity surrounding the character's imminent debut in Ultimate.

In his review of the Steve DLC for Ultimate, Mitchell Saltzman of IGN described Steve as one of the most complex fighters ever introduced in the game in terms of gameplay mechanics and highlighted the ways developers incorporated the resource collection and item crafting mechanics of Minecraft into Steve's moveset. Kotaku staff were divided over the iteration of Steve in Ultimate. Ian Walker considered Steve as one of the most exciting characters to play in Ultimate after observing an event where a player used Steve's construction capabilities. Ari Notis took a less favorable view and called him the strangest character he had ever played, describing the visual and gameplay dissonances he observed from the implementation of Steve in Ultimate.

Since Steve's addition, the character has been regarded as overpowered within the game's competitive community, who have cited Steve's unorthodox playstyle and rapid rise in high placements at competitions. In February 2023, a tier list created by several professional Ultimate players considered Steve the best character in the game. Players began advocating for Steve to be banned from tournaments, fearing the character's dominance could negatively affect viewership similarly to the influence Bayonetta had on Super Smash Bros. for Wii U. Some opposed the ban, stating that effective counterplay had yet to be developed. As more players selected the character and their win rates increased, calls for a ban intensified. By March 2023, Steve was banned in several tournaments due to the discovery of a new technique that removes the consequences from opponent attacks, effectively allowing Steve to immediately retaliate. This method is known as the "Phantom MLG".

=== Analysis ===
In an entry from the 2017 publication 100 Greatest Video Game Characters, Chris Bailey explained that the sparse knowledge on Steve shows how video game avatars are being perceived in relation to player identity; the character embodies and conducts the spirit of freedom and customization inherent to sandbox games. He elaborated that Steve exemplifies the "centrality" of relatable avatars in affording players their own creative agency in and around video games; while other games allow a certain level of customization, Steve embodies this possibility more than most by allowing users to change the entire surface of the body beyond changing between pre-defined hairstyles or skin colors. This process is visible through the proliferation of online communities set up to share user-generated adapted skins.

While Persson asserted that Steve's gender is non-binary, Bailey took the view that it is "initially difficult" to account for the inclusion of an avatar with an "evidently gendered name". Nevertheless, Bailey observed that Minecraft's player communities have embraced the game's openness due to their enthusiasm in customizing their avatars' appearances. This is achieved through the process of overlaying a new skin over Steve. Similarly, H. Chad Lane said the concept of skins in Minecraft, with Steve and Alex as starting points for the player to create their avatar, can act as a reflection of the player's identity and self-perceptions, regardless of whether it is similar to or in contrast to the real world.
