= Project Nomads =

2002 video game

- Developers: Radon Labs; Virtual Programming (Mac)
- Publishers: CDV; Freeverse Software (Mac version)
- Engine: Nebula Device
- Platform: Windows
- Release: November 5, 2002 (PC); November 11, 2004 (Mac)
- Genre: Shooter/Strategy hybrid
- Modes: Single-player, multiplayer

Project Nomads is a 2002 computer game by Radon Labs released for Windows and macOS. A version for the Original Xbox was announced in November 2002, but never released. It is set on the fictional planet Aeres, a world of floating islands which are the remnants of the planet from before it exploded. Few surviving inhabitants settle on drifting fragments of Aeres following its explosion. The player character is a nomad tasked with wandering across these islands, discovering mysterious artifacts and exploring the ruins of the long-dead race of Master Builders, a group of highly skilled and influential characters within the game's world. These characters possess exceptional knowledge and expertise in constructing and manipulating the floating islands that make up the game's environment. The only place to fall to is the Sea of Flames, the utmost depth of this new world.

== Gameplay ==
A floating island

The majority of the game is spent on the player's floating island. At the beginning of the game the island sports only a single control tower, which is used to navigate. Throughout the course of the game, players can upgrade their island by building various structures ranging from defensive cannons to power plants that supply energy.

Structures are created with the help of Artifacts, magical remnants of an ancient era. Artifacts can be found throughout the game. While often hidden to a varying degree, these may also be granted through interaction with NPCs. When activated, an artifact quickly deploys into a building.

Artifacts may be either red or blue. Both are used to create buildings; red artifacts are lost on a building's destruction, but blue artifacts will reappear in place of the destroyed structure. Multiple artifacts of the same type can be combined to create an upgraded, more powerful version. For instance, two defensive turret artifacts, when combined, will unfurl into a level two defensive turret, which, unlike a level one turret, will engage with enemies automatically. Combining artifacts of level two will yield a level three defensive turret, sporting dual cannons with increased damage output.

To build, the player selects an artifact and then selects the part of the island where the structure will be placed (certain structures, such as hangars, are limited to certain spots on the island). Also, a building cannot be created if the player's character is standing in the way. The island has energy which is used for things like construction, or operating buildings on the island such as the gun towers, or repairs. The island also has health, which is represented by the state of a player's lighthouse. If the island's health is low, and the player cannot repair the lighthouse in time, the island will collapse and plummet.

The island structures will be different depending on the character chosen by the player. The structures used by the character Susie, for example, look similar to plants (e.g. gun tower resembles a mushroom). Goliath's buildings, however, have a more futuristic or high-tech (this gun tower has the aesthetic of a more traditional cannon or sentry turret). The player's choice of character informs the strategy the player may best employ. For example, the guns fired by Goliath's island are slow moving, but powerful. The largest threat to a player using Goliath would be faster enemies, such as enemy fighters. Meanwhile, a player using Goliath would have an easier time when under attack by slower-moving threats: enemy towers or islands.

Certain buildings, such as hangars and gun turrets, can be directly controlled by the player. The player presses the appropriate key to take control of one of those structures. Multiple presses of the key will result in switching to different defensive buildings. Taking control of one of these buildings allows the player to attack enemies that are the most dangerous to the island first, or use a fighter to attack them before they can attack the island.

On occasion, the player's island will dock with other floating islands, allowing the player character to explore. Parts of the game are also spent remote-controlling a fighter jet. Throughout the course of the story, missions include getting to a specific location, escorting another island, fending off a large-scale assault, exploring other islands and dogfighting using remote-controlled planes.

The enemies a player will encounter include the Sentinels and the Skrits. Skrits are large insects, which will approach the player and explode to release a toxic gas. Most Skrits are grounded, only capable of walking, though some more formidable Skrits are capable of flight. Both impose a significant threat to the player and their island. Unlike the Skrits, Sentinels fight with machines. Sentinels have an array of similar weapons to the player, such as armed islands, and fighter planes.

== Reception ==
Reception

Aggregate score
Aggregator	Score
Metacritic	62/100

Project Nomads has received mixed reviews. The lack of key mappings as well as glitches getting in the way of gameplay were some of the criticisms as mentioned by PC Invasion.

Project Nomads won the ECTS Best PC Game of the Show Award 2001.
