= Sly Mongoose =

2008 novel by Tobias S. Buckell

- First edition
- Author: Tobias S. Buckell
- Cover artist: Todd Lockwood
- Language: English
- Genre: Science fiction
- Publisher: Tor Books
- Publication date: August 19, 2008
- Publication place: United States
- Media type: Hardcover
- Pages: 352
- ISBN: 0-7653-1920-9
- OCLC: 184823039
- Dewey Decimal: 813/.6 22
- LC Class: PS3602.U2635 S58 2008
- Preceded by: Ragamuffin
- Followed by: The Apocalypse Ocean

Sly Mongoose is the third science fiction novel of Caribbean writer Tobias S. Buckell. The novel is a standalone but is set in the same universe as Buckell's novels Crystal Rain and Ragamuffin. The novels are also linked by a recurring character. The book's title is taken from a Jamaican folk song of the same name.

The book has received several reviews.
