= Kimi no Yusha =

2008 video game

- Cover art
- Developer: SNK Playmore
- Publisher: SNK Playmore
- Platform: Nintendo DS
- Release: JP: October 23, 2008
- Genre: Role-playing video game
- Mode: Single-player

Kimi no Yusha (キミの勇者, Kimi no Yūsha; Japanese for "Your Hero") is a role-playing game which was developed and published by SNK Playmore for the Nintendo DS video game console. Kimino Yusha was unveiled at the 2007 Tokyo Game Show, then was released in 2008 in Japan.

Kimi no Yusha was designed for people who didn't have a lot of time to play RPGs, and was said to promise large-scale adventures that could be played in 30 minutes. There are about 24 chapters and each chapter takes about 30 minutes to complete, thus making it consistent and short at the same time.

The character designs in the game highly resemble the ones used in a fellow SNK Playmore series called Doki Doki Majo Shinpan!.
