= Tobias Buckell =

Grenada-born writer (born 1979)

- Born: 1979 (age 46–47); Grenada
- Occupations: Novelist, English teacher, creative writing instructor, writer for hire
- Spouse: Emily Hyatt Buckell
- Children: 2
- Writing career
- Genres: Science fiction, speculative fiction, fantasy
- Website: tobiasbuckell.com

Tobias Samuel Buckell (born January 2, 1979, in Grenada) is a Grenadian/British science fiction and fantasy writer.

From his first sold short story, "The Fish Merchant", in March 2000, he has written over a hundred stories, including novels, novellas, short stories, and collections, which have been written and translated into nineteen languages. Across his writing career, he and his work have been nominated for several awards, including the WSFA Small Press Award, Nebula Award, and Prometheus Award. He has also made The New York Times Best Seller list in 2008 for his novel, Halo: The Cole Protocol, and additionally won several awards, including the Writers and Illustrators of the Future Award and World Fantasy Award.

In addition to his authorship, he has also been a judge for the World Fantasy Award, a vice president of the Science Fiction and Fantasy Writers Association, an English instructor at Bluffton University, and a Creative Writing instructor for the University of Southern Maine’s Stonecoast MFA program.

== Early life and education ==
Tobias S. Buckell was born in Grenada in the Caribbean, an island country in the West Indies and Caribbean Sea, where he lived on his family’s boat. Throughout his childhood, he and his family moved to live throughout the Virgin Islands (British and American between 1989 and 1995) until Hurricane Marilyn decimated his family’s boat home.

He and his family moved to Bluffton, Ohio when he was 16, where he eventually went on to attend and graduate from Bluffton University in 2000, as well as Clarion Workshop in 1999. About that same time, he sold his first short story, "Fish Merchant", to writer and editor Scott Edelman of Science Fiction Age, who assisted in its 2000 publication. In addition to this first publication, another of Buckell's stories, “In Orbite Medievali” won the Writers and Illustrators of the Future Volume 16 quarterly contest that same year, hosted by Ron Collins.

Since then, in addition to where he posts his works on his own website, his stories have appeared in various publications, including Writers and Illustrators of the Future, Nature, and Clarkesworld.

== Identity, personal life, and activism ==
Tobias S. Buckell, though “white passing” in his own terms with Locus Magazine, proclaims his biracial identity. Through his involvement with the Science Fiction and Fantasy Writers Association, as well as his office in it, he's discussed his own identity, as well as further authorial diversity, at length; and in a similar regard, several of his works involve and incorporate the history and culture of the Caribbean.

He has performed further advocacy in his own site-space through openness of his struggles with ADHD and dyslexia; beyond these discussions, he has sought to provide his own experiences as a guide for others in his circumstances.

Though not American, he lived for some years in Bluffton, Ohio, with his wife Emily, as well as their two daughters. In 2026 he moved to Scotland, citing the threat of ICE harassment along with the beauty of the Scottish landscape and the better quality of life for his family.

== Careers ==
=== Extra-authorial jobs ===
- Stonecoast MFA - Creative Writing program (2019–Present).
- Science Fiction and Fantasy Writers Association - Vice President (2020 - 2022).
- Bluffton University - English Teacher and Journal Instructor (2021–Present).

=== Literary works ===
Source:

== Awards and honors ==
Sources:

== Further external links ==
- Interview at SFFWorld.com
- Interview at wotmania.com
- Interview at the SciFiDimensions podcast
- Interview at Clarkesworld Magazine Issue 30, March 2009
