= Night Skies =

Unproduced science fiction horror film conceived by Steven Spielberg

- Directed by: Tobe Hooper
- Written by: John Sayles

Night Skies is an unproduced science fiction horror film that was in development following the success of Steven Spielberg's Close Encounters of the Third Kind (1977). Although Night Skies was never made, some of its ideas inspired E.T. the Extra-Terrestrial (1982), Poltergeist (1982), and Gremlins (1984).

== Origins ==
The genesis of Night Skies began in the late 1970s when Columbia Pictures wanted a sequel to Close Encounters of the Third Kind. Spielberg had no interest in a sequel, but also did not want Columbia to make a sequel without him, as Universal Pictures had done with Jaws. Instead, he came up with a horror film treatment for a Close Encounters follow-up, initially titled Watch the Skies (which had been a working title for Close Encounters). He based the story on the Kelly-Hopkinsville encounter, where a Kentucky family claimed they had been terrorized by gremlin-like aliens. Spielberg had heard the story from UFOlogist J. Allen Hynek while doing research for Close Encounters.

In Spielberg's original treatment for Watch the Skies, eleven malicious extraterrestrial scientists try to communicate with chickens, cows, and other livestock in an attempt to discover which of Earth's animal species are sentient, before turning their unwelcome attentions to a human family and dissecting their farm animals. Fueling Hollywood rumors about the film, NASA announced that Spielberg paid to reserve cargo space for the inaugural Space Shuttle flight, in order to film the Earth and its Moon from orbit for the film's opening sequence. Spielberg stated that he would produce Watch the Skies but not direct it, as he was under contract to direct his next film for Universal.

== John Sayles and Rick Baker ==
Spielberg at first wanted Lawrence Kasdan to flesh out his Watch the Skies treatment into a screenplay, but Kasdan was busy writing The Empire Strikes Back, so Spielberg turned to John Sayles (who had written Joe Dante's Roger Corman-produced Jaws spoof Piranha, which Spielberg had loved). Watch the Skies was renamed Night Skies because someone owned the rights to the phrase "watch the skies" (which was the last line in The Thing from Another World).

Some called the Night Skies script "Straw Dogs with aliens", but Sayles says his inspiration was the 1939 John Ford-directed film Drums Along the Mohawk, where a young couple defend their isolated frontier farmhouse against Native American attacks. Sayles named one of the aliens "Skar" (a character said to be "a real badass") after a Comanche villain in another John Ford film, The Searchers (1956). Ron Cobb was hired to direct Night Skies. The film was scheduled to begin shooting after Spielberg finished Raiders of the Lost Ark. He chose make-up and special effects master Rick Baker (who at the time was also working on John Landis's An American Werewolf in London) to design and create the alien creatures. Baker built a prototype of the lead alien that cost $70,000 and thrilled Spielberg and Kathleen Kennedy when they saw a videotape of it while filming Raiders of the Lost Ark in London.

In mid-1980, Sayles delivered his first (and, in the end, only) draft of the screenplay, which featured five aliens (cut down from the original eleven) including the aforementioned Skar, plus "Squirt", "Klud", "Hoodoo" and "Budde". The latter alien was kindhearted and befriended the human family's autistic son. Sayles's script opened with Skar (who was described in the script as having a beak-like mouth and eyes like a grasshopper's) killing farm animals by touching them with a long bony finger which gave off an eerie light. The script ended with Budde, marooned on Earth by his mean-spirited peers, cowering under the shadow of an approaching hawk. Although they had some differences over the Night Skies script, Spielberg and Sayles parted amicably and the film project continued on.

== Origin of E.T. and Poltergeist ==
While Baker worked on the aliens, Spielberg began having second thoughts about Night Skies: "I might have taken leave of my senses. Throughout [the production of] Raiders, I was in between killing Nazis and blowing up flying wings and having Harrison Ford in all this high serialized adventure, I was sitting there in the middle of Tunisia, scratching my head and saying, 'I've got to get back to the tranquillity, or at least the spirituality, of Close Encounters.'" While on the set of Raiders, Spielberg read the Night Skies script to Melissa Mathison (who was there to see her then-boyfriend and future husband Harrison Ford), and she cried after hearing it because "the idea of an alien creature who was benevolent, tender, emotional and sweet... and the idea of the creature's striking up a relationship with a child who came from a broken home was very affecting".

When Spielberg returned from Tunisia and Hawaii (where the opening of Raiders of the Lost Ark was filmed), he closed the door on Night Skies and started planning the film Mathison had written with the title ET and Me, which would be released to massive success 18 months later as E.T. the Extra-Terrestrial. Rick Baker—who spent $700,000 on unused Night Skies designs, models and animatronics—had a huge fight with Spielberg, which led to Carlo Rambaldi (who had previously done alien creature designs for Close Encounters) doing creature designs for E.T.. John P. Veitch (then-president of Columbia's worldwide productions) and Frank Price (then-president of Columbia) were also unhappy with the emergence of E.T. and did not want to make "a wimpy Walt Disney movie".

In February 1981 (six months after Columbia's desire for a Close Encounters follow-up had been fulfilled by Close Encounters of the Third Kind: The Special Edition), Columbia put the Night Skies/E.T. project in turnaround. Sid Sheinberg (Spielberg's long-time friend and president of Universal's parent company MCA), bought the Night Skies/E.T. project from Columbia, repaying them the $1 million that had been used thus far to develop the project, and signing a deal in which Columbia would retain 5% of the film's net profits. Veitch later said, "I think that year we made more on that picture [E.T.] than we did on any of our films."

Sayles never requested a screenwriting co-credit for E.T., saying he viewed his Night Skies ending with "the nice E.T. being marooned on Earth by his peers" as "more of a jumping-off point than something that was raided for material. I thought [Mathison] had done a great job." The horror elements of Night Skies also influenced Poltergeist, directed by Tobe Hooper from a story by Spielberg. The film features a suburban family terrorized by paranormal forces.

== Legacy ==
Although Night Skies never saw the light of day, it helped inspire not only E.T. and Poltergeist but also Gremlins (featuring one kindly member of a species of otherwise mean-spirited creatures, as well as a marquee adverting Watch the Skies on a movie theater, co-billed with A Boy's Life, the working title for E.T.); and Spielberg's War of the Worlds adaptation. In the mid-1980s, Spielberg and Mathison wrote a ten-page treatment for an E.T. sequel called E.T. II: Nocturnal Fears, which was to have featured malicious, animal-mutilating cousins of E.T., but the project was not pursued.

== See also ==
- Dark Skies (1996), a TV show with a similar premise
- Dark Skies (2013), an unrelated sci-fi horror film with a similar premise.
- Steven Spielberg's unrealized projects
