= Elliott Taylor =

Film character from Steven Spielberg's "E.T. the Extra-Terrestrial" (1982)

- E.T. the Extra-Terrestrial character
- Elliott, as he appears in E.T. the Extra-Terrestrial (1982)
- First appearance: E.T. the Extra-Terrestrial; 1982
- Last appearance: A Holiday Reunion; 2019
- Created by: Steven Spielberg; Melissa Mathison
- Portrayed by: Henry Thomas

In-universe information
- Species: Human
- Gender: Male
- Affiliation: Human friend of E.T.
- Family: Mary Taylor (mother); Unnamed father (divorced); Gertie Taylor (sister); Michael Taylor (brother)
- Spouse: Grace (A Holiday Reunion)
- Children: Elliott Jr. (son; A Holiday Reunion); Maggie (daughter; A Holiday Reunion)
- Nationality: American
- Hometown: San Fernando Valley, Los Angeles, California

Elliott Taylor is a fictional character in Steven Spielberg's 1982 science fiction film E.T. the Extra-Terrestrial. Created by Spielberg and the film's screenwriter Melissa Mathison and portrayed by then 10-year-old Henry Thomas, Elliott serves as the main human protagonist who, along with his friends and family, helps the titular extraterrestrial return home. Thomas's performance earned widespread acclaim from critics and the public. The character has also appeared in various adaptations of the film, including a novelization and video games, as well as a short film sequel in which Thomas reprised the role.

== Inspiration and casting ==
While the character is original, aspects of Elliott are based on Spielberg himself, mainly involving the fact that he is a child of divorced parents, except that unlike Spielberg, Elliott lives with his mother, Mary (Dee Wallace), an older brother Michael (Robert MacNaughton) and younger sister Gertie (Drew Barrymore).

Spielberg auditioned hundreds of boys for the role of Elliott, including Keith Coogan. Jack Fisk suggested Henry Thomas for the role; Fisk had directed Thomas in the film Raggedy Man (1981). Thomas, who auditioned in an Indiana Jones costume, did not perform well in the formal testing, but got the filmmakers' attention in an improvised scene. Thoughts of his dead dog inspired his convincing tears.

== Appearances ==
=== Unrealized feature sequel ===
In 1982, during the film's first theatrical run, Spielberg and Mathison wrote a treatment for a sequel to be titled E.T. II: Nocturnal Fears. It would have shown Elliott and his friends getting kidnapped by evil aliens, and attempting to contact E.T. for help. Spielberg decided not to pursue it, feeling it "would do nothing but rob the original of its virginity. E.T. is not about going back to the planet". Thomas has said that he hopes a feature-length sequel never gets made, but added "I guarantee you, there are a few men in a very big room now salivating and using their Abacus and slide rules to come up with some really, really big numbers."

=== A Holiday Reunion (2019) ===
Elliott and E.T. during a scene in the short film sequel A Holiday Reunion (2019).

On November 28, 2019, during NBC's broadcast of the 93rd Macy's Thanksgiving Day Parade, Xfinity released a four-minute commercial directed by Lance Acord, calling it a "short film sequel" to the original film, titled A Holiday Reunion. The commercial stars Henry Thomas as Elliott, now an adult with a family of his own. Julianne Hoyak plays his wife Grace, while Zebastin Borjeau and Alivia Drews play their children, Elliott Jr. and Maggie. The story follows E.T. as he returns to Earth for the holiday season and focuses on the importance of bringing family together. References and nods to the original film are featured, such as a photo of the Taylors' family dog Harvey on the kitchen fridge and a replica of the makeshift Speak & Spell communication device.

=== Books ===
William Kotzwinkle, author of the film's novelization, wrote a sequel, E.T.: The Book of the Green Planet, which was published in 1985. In the novel, E.T. returns home to the planet Brodo Asogi, but is subsequently demoted and sent into exile. He attempts to return to Earth, breaking Brodo Asogi's laws. Elliott appears, playing a supporting role.

=== Video games ===
Atari, Inc. produced a video game based on the film for the Atari 2600 and hired Howard Scott Warshaw to program the game. The game was rushed in five weeks to release within the 1982 holiday season. It was critically panned and has been considered to be one of the worst video games ever made. It was also a commercial failure. It has been cited as a contributing factor to the video game industry crash of 1983, has been mocked in popular culture, and is cited as a cautionary tale about the dangers of rushed game development and studio interference. As a result of overproduction and returns, millions of unsold cartridges were secretly buried in an Alamogordo, New Mexico landfill and covered with a layer of concrete. In April 2014, an investigation confirmed that the Alamogordo landfill contained many E.T. cartridges, among other games.

In 2017, video game developer Zen Studios released a pinball adaptation as part of the Universal Classics add-on pack for the virtual pinball game Pinball FX 3.

== Reception and legacy ==
Thomas's performance as Elliott received acclaim by critics and audiences; Screen Rant called it one of the best child actor performances ever seen on film. The character was nominated for the "Heroes" list on AFI's 100 Years...100 Heroes & Villains but didn't make the final list. For his performance, Thomas won the Young Artist Award for Best Leading Young Actor in a Feature Film and received nominations for the Golden Globe Award for New Star of the Year – Actor, the BAFTA Award for Most Promising Newcomer to Leading Film Roles, and the Saturn Award for Best Actor.

Elliott Taylor served as a major inspiration for Mike Wheeler from Stranger Things. In fact, Mike was originally named Elliot.
