= E.T. the Extra-Terrestrial in video games =

E.T.
- Genre: Various
- Developer: Atari, Inc.
- Publishers: Atari, Inc.
- Platforms: Atari 2600, TI-99/4A, Atari 8-bit, Game Boy Advance, Game Boy Color, IBM PC
- First release: E.T. the Extra-Terrestrial; 1982
- Latest release: E.T.: Pinball; 2017
- Parent series: E.T. the Extra-Terrestrial

Several video games and genres have been created as a result of the release of the film E.T. the Extra-Terrestrial based on the story and themes of the original game.

== E.T. the Extra-Terrestrial (Atari, 1982) ==
E.T. the Extra-Terrestrial was released in December of 1982 on the Atari 2600, only to a North American audience. The game was based on the original film released in the same year. Despite the popularity of the film, the game has been deemed one of the worst ever made. The game's problems stem from development being rushed at launch, only taking 5 weeks to develop. The game's poor quality is often blamed for the Video Game Crash of 1983 and was one of the main games found in the Atari video game burial in New Mexico, with around 1300 copies buried.

== 1983 ==
=== E.T. Go Home (UFI und sein gefährlicher Einsatz) (Atari, 1983) ===
E.T. Go Home is a 1983 video game for the Atari 2600. It was originally a European game known as UFI und sein gefährlicher Einsatz. The game revolves around collecting spaceship parts in a maze while avoiding enemy aliens.

=== E.T. Phone Home! (Atari, 1983) ===
E.T. Phone Home! was released by Atari, Inc. for the Atari 8-bit computers in 1983. The graphics were designed by British game designer and artist, John O'Neill. The game revolves around Elliott, who must search the neighborhood for pieces that E.T. wants to use to build his transmitter. Depending on the level, players might or might not need all the pieces to complete the game. It's also possible to communicate "telepathically" with E.T. to get a reminder of which pieces he is looking for.

As Elliott looks for the pieces, he is pursued by a number of men who are trying to stop him from completing his task. Once Elliott gets enough of the pieces, E.T. says his famous line "E.T. Phone Home". From there, players control E.T. trying to find his way back to the landing site in the forest. The game ends with E.T. returning to his spaceship before ascending into outer space.

==== Reception ====
"Why have an E.T. game?", wondered Creative Computing. criticizing it as a simplistic "disappointment for anyone old enough to be reading this review". The magazine said that "nine different difficulty levels lengthen the duration of the game rather than add to the excitement of it. The graphics are crude and the game does not have much staying power".

=== E.T. the Extra-Terrestrial (1983) ===
E.T. the Extra-Terrestrial is a 1983 video game for the TI-99/4A.

== 2001 ==
=== E.T.: Digital Companion ===
Released for the Game Boy Color on October 18, 2001, this cartridge allows the Game Boy Color to be used as a child-friendly personal digital assistant. The E.T.: Digital Planner features an address book, a calendar, a clock, and a To-Do List. The software also contains five mini games, including a virtual pet, named the "Flopgopple". Information within the software can be protected with a password or by printing it out on the Game Boy Printer.

=== E.T.: Escape from Planet Earth ===
Released for the Game Boy Color on November 4, 2001.

The aim of the game is to find five parts to construct a communicator that will allow E.T. to call his spaceship back to Earth, so he can return home.

These parts are found by completing the puzzle-levels in each of the game's five themed areas (city, desert, forest, etc.) and then trading the items found at the tree-house in that area. Only when you gain the communicator-part in an area can you proceed to the next one.

In the majority of the levels, the player will only play as E.T.; however, each area has three larger puzzle-rooms (denoted by a "?" on the map) in which Elliott is also playable, and the 'B' button is used to swap between characters. Elliott can jump at any-time, unlike E.T., however he cannot use any of the power-up tokens a stage may offer.

There are three difficulty levels, as well as mini-quests that unlock tradable hidden items. If the player finds most of the non-communicator parts, Gertie, the sister of Elliott, will offer the password "L4Z6" at the end of the game. Entering this as the name of a save-file will then change some of the enemies within certain puzzles.

=== E.T. the Extra-Terrestrial ===
Released for the Game Boy Advance on December 14, 2001. Players must save E.T. from the government agents, scientists, and law enforcement officers that are trying to catch him while attempting to assemble a transmitter that will allow E.T. to phone home.

== 2002 ==
=== E.T.: Interplanetary Mission ===
Released on March 27, 2002, in North America and on March 29, 2002, in Europe for the Microsoft Windows and Sony PlayStation on December 30, 2002, in North America and in 2002 in Europe. E.T. is on a mission to save the universe by collecting rare plants from planets with various climates and using E.T.'s glowing finger to recover their health. Gameplay involves solving puzzles as well as combat.

=== E.T. and the Cosmic Garden ===
Released for the Game Boy Color in March 2002, E.T. Cosmic Garden is a real-time adventure where you travel to six planets for the spaceship's greenhouse and fulfill E.T.'s original mission by replanting and restoring the Cosmic Garden. E.T. and his assistants, Space Bee and Space Slug maintain proper amounts of food, water, and light, and to protect these special species from a host of intergalactic pests, including space beetles, fungus, and harmful celestial events, such as a prolonged eclipse. E.T. can use his special telekinesis powers to control the pests.

Features 12 levels and seven environments. Players can create more than 60 plants, each with unique personalities and abilities. Completion of the game to unlocks the never-ending Prize Garden.

=== E.T.: Away from Home ===
Released for Microsoft Windows on March 27, 2002, for the 20th Anniversary of E.T.

=== E.T.: Phone Home Adventure ===
Released for Microsoft Windows on March 27, 2002, for the 20th Anniversary of E.T.

== 2012 ==
=== E.T.: The Green Planet ===
Released for iOS on October 9, 2012, for the 30th Anniversary of E.T. It is a farming game in which the player plants seeds, waits for them to grow, and sells them for profit in order to upgrade their farm in the same style as many farming apps that were popular at the time, such as Farmville. The music for the game was composed by David Ari Leon.

== 2015 ==
=== Lego Dimensions (2015) ===
In the toys-to-life video game Lego Dimensions E.T. is included as a playable character and a purchasable real-life figure. On November 18, 2015, he was released in a pack containing E.T. himself and a "Phone Home" gadget. The use of his figure unlocks an E.T.-themed adventure map.

== 2017 ==
=== E.T. Pinball (2017) ===
35 years after the film's release, Zen Studios developed and released a virtual pinball adaptation of it as one of three tables based on iconic Universal Pictures classic films created after Universal agreed to a partnership with Zen. The table is available as a purchased, downloadable add-on for the game Pinball FX 3 and features 3-D animated figures of Elliott, E.T. and his spaceship. This table was remastered for Pinball FX on March 31, 2022.

== Cancelled ==
- E.T.: Return to the Green Planet - PlayStation 2
- E.T.: Search for Dragora - GameCube, Xbox
- E.T.: Salerian Project - Game Boy Advance
