= E.T. (character) =

Film character from Steven Spielberg's "E.T. the Extra-Terrestrial" (1982)

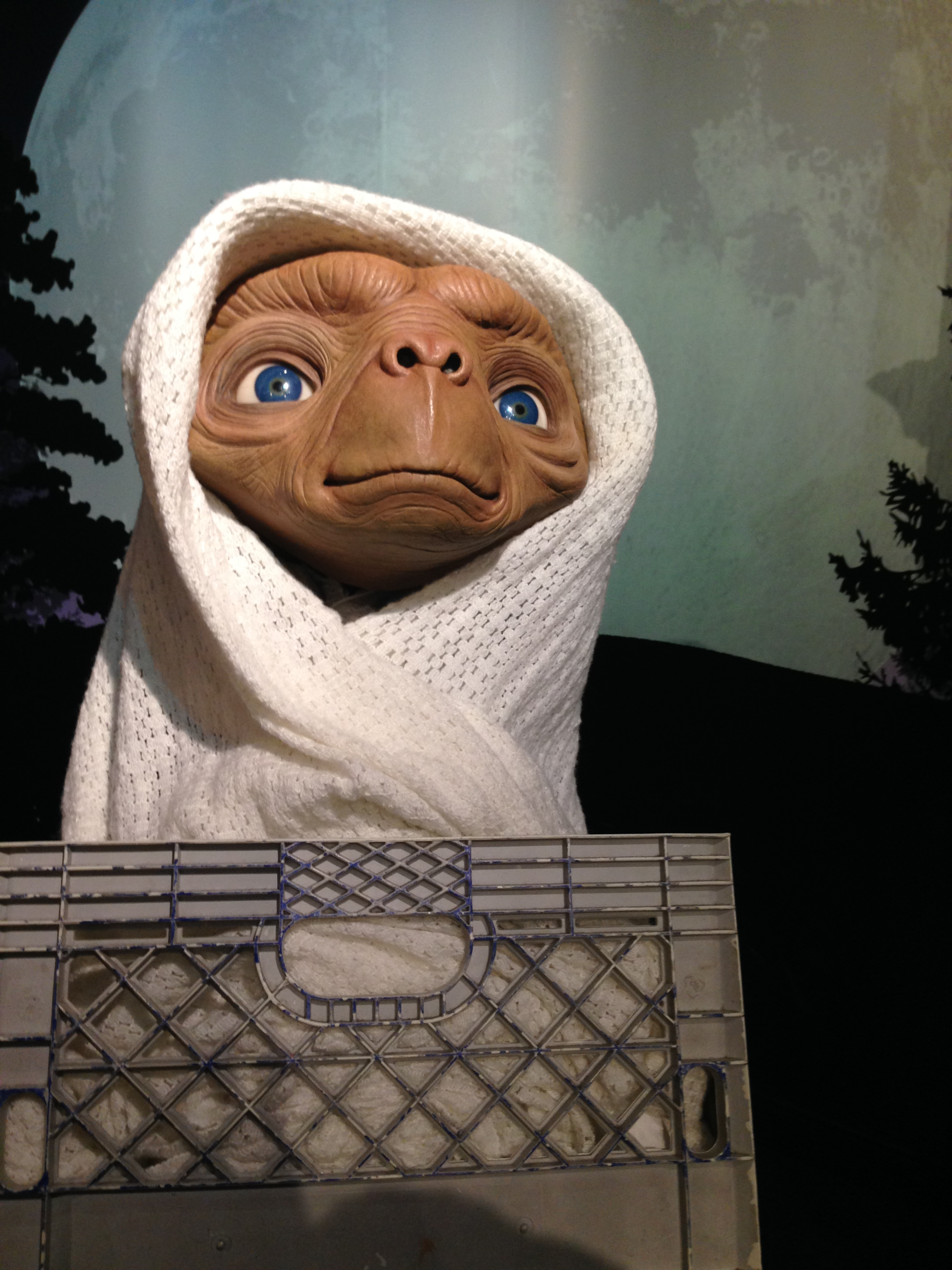
- Waxwork of E.T. at Madame Tussauds, London
- First appearance: E.T. the Extra-Terrestrial; 1982
- Last appearance: A Holiday Reunion; 2019
- Created by: Steven Spielberg; Melissa Mathison
- Designed by: Carlo Rambaldi
- Portrayed by: Tamara De Treaux; Pat Bilon; Matthew DeMeritt
- Voiced by: Pat Welsh; Steven Spielberg; Kayden Green

In-universe information
- Full name: Zrek
- Alias: The extraterrestrial
- Nicknames: Spaceman (by Elliott); Goblin (by Michael); The man from the Moon (by Gertie)
- Species: Asogian (alien)
- Gender: Male
- Title: Doctor
- Occupation: Alien scientist and explorer
- Affiliation: Friend to Elliott Taylor
- Family: Parent (mother)
- Origin: Brodo Asogi (the Green Planet)
- Abilities: Telekinesis, telepathy, healing

E.T. is a character and the titular extraterrestrial from Steven Spielberg's 1982 film E.T. the Extra-Terrestrial. Created by Spielberg and the film's screenwriter Melissa Mathison, E.T. seeks the help of a boy named Elliott Taylor (Henry Thomas) who, along with his friends and family, find a way to help E.T. return home. The character has been and continues to be widely assessed as one of the greatest science fiction film characters of all time and is considered an icon of the genre. The character has appeared in all of its other media, including books, video games, a theme park attraction and a short film sequel.

== Inspiration and creation ==
After his parents' divorce in 1960, Spielberg filled the void with an imaginary alien companion that he recalled as "a friend who could be the brother [he] never had and a father that [he] didn't feel [he] had anymore". In 1978, he announced that he would shoot a film entitled Growing Up, which he would film in four weeks. However, the project was set aside due to delays on 1941 (1979), but the concept of making a small autobiographical film about childhood would stay with him. He thought about a follow-up to Close Encounters of the Third Kind (1977), and began to develop a darker project he had planned with John Sayles called Night Skies, in which malevolent aliens terrorize a family. He told screenwriter Melissa Mathison about Night Skies, and developed a subplot from the failed project in which Buddy, the only friendly alien, befriends an autistic child. Buddy's abandonment on Earth in the script's final scene inspired the concept of E.T. In less than two months, Mathison wrote the first draft of the script, titled E.T. and Me, which went through two rewrites. The project was rejected by Columbia Pictures, who doubted its commercial potential. Universal Pictures eventually purchased the script for $1 million.

=== Creature design ===
Carlo Rambaldi, who designed the aliens for Close Encounters of the Third Kind, was hired to design the animatronics for E.T. Rambaldi's own painting Women of Delta led him to give the creature a unique, extendable neck. Its face was inspired by those of Carl Sandburg, Albert Einstein and Ernest Hemingway. Producer Kathleen Kennedy visited the Jules Stein Eye Institute to study real and glass eyes. She hired Institute staffers to create E.T.'s eyes, which she felt were particularly important in engaging the audience. Four heads were created for filming, one as the main animatronic and the others for facial expressions, as well as a costume. A team of puppeteers controlled E.T.'s face with animatronics. Two people with dwarfism, Tamara De Treaux and Pat Bilon, as well as 12-year-old Matthew DeMeritt, who was born without legs, took turns wearing the costume, depending on what scene was being filmed. DeMeritt walked on his hands and played all scenes where he walked awkwardly or fell over. The head was placed above that of the actors, and the actors could see through slits in its chest. Caprice Roth, a professional mime, filled prosthetics to play E.T.'s hands. The puppet was created in three months at the cost of $1.5 million. Spielberg declared that it was "something that only a mother could love".

== Appearances ==
=== Unrealized feature sequel ===
In July 1982, during the film's first theatrical run, Spielberg and Mathison wrote a treatment for a sequel to be titled E.T. II: Nocturnal Fears. It would have shown Elliott and his friends getting kidnapped by evil aliens, and attempting to contact E.T. for help. Spielberg decided against pursuing it, feeling it "would do nothing but rob the original of its virginity. E.T. is not about going back to the planet". In June 2022, Henry Thomas said that he hopes a feature-length sequel never gets made, but added "I guarantee you, there are a few men in a very big room now salivating and using their abacus and slide rules to come up with some really, really big numbers." Spielberg also said that a sequel to E.T. "would do nothing but rob the original".

=== A Holiday Reunion (2019) ===
On November 28, 2019, during NBC's broadcast of the 93rd Macy's Thanksgiving Day Parade, Xfinity released a four-minute commercial directed by Lance Acord, calling it a "short film sequel" to the original film, titled A Holiday Reunion. The commercial stars Henry Thomas, reprising his role as Elliott, now an adult with a family of his own. Julianne Hoyak played his wife, Grace, while Zebastin Borjeau and Alivia Drews played their children, Elliott Jr. and Maggie. The story follows E.T. as he returns to Earth for the holiday season, and focuses on the importance of bringing family together. References and nods to the original film are featured, such as a photo of the Taylors' family dog Harvey on the kitchen fridge and a replica of the makeshift Speak & Spell communication device.

The commercial uses a practical puppet for E.T. himself. In an interview with Deadline, Acord said that he went this route to elicit more realistic performances from the actors, the same way Spielberg did on the original film. John Williams' score from the original film is mixed into the commercial. Spielberg was consulted by Comcast (parent company of NBCUniversal, which itself owns Universal Pictures) before production on the commercial began.

=== Books ===
William Kotzwinkle, author of the film's novelization, wrote a sequel, E.T.: The Book of the Green Planet, which was published in 1985. In the novel, E.T. returns home to the planet Brodo Asogi, but is subsequently demoted and sent into exile. He attempts to return to Earth by effectively breaking all of Brodo Asogi's laws.

=== Video games ===
Atari, Inc. produced a video game based on the film for the Atari 2600 and hired Howard Scott Warshaw to program the game. The game was rushed in five weeks to release within the 1982 holiday season. Released in Christmas 1982, the game was critically panned, with nearly every aspect of the game facing heavy criticism. It is considered to be one of the worst video games ever made. It was also a commercial failure. It has been cited as a major contributing factor to the video game industry crash of 1983, and has been frequently referenced and mocked in popular culture as a cautionary tale about the dangers of rushed game development and studio interference. In what was initially deemed an urban legend, reports from 1983 stated that as a result of overproduction and returns, millions of unsold cartridges were secretly buried in an Alamogordo, New Mexico landfill and covered with a layer of concrete. In April 2014, diggers hired to investigate the claim confirmed that the Alamogordo landfill contained many E.T. cartridges, among other games.

In 2017, video game developer Zen Studios released a pinball adaptation as part of the Universal Classics add-on pack for the virtual pinball game Pinball FX 3. It features 3-D animated figures of Elliott, E.T. and his spacecraft.

=== Theme park attraction ===
E.T. Adventure, a theme park ride based on the film and drawing inspiration from The Book of the Green Planet, debuted at Universal Studios Florida on June 7, 1990. The $40 million attraction features the title character saying goodbye to visitors by name, along with his home planet.

== In popular culture ==
In the 1982 painting Yalta Conference, Soviet conceptual artists Komar and Melamid depict E.T. in FDR's outfit along with Stalin in a military uniform and Hitler looming from behind their backs. Boris Groys links this image to a "post-utopian" sentiment of the Sots Art, as opposed to anti-utopian message of the pop art, which also makes use of totalitarian images and pop culture icons in an interchangeable way, but robs them of the transformational utopian message.

In 1998, E.T. was licensed to appear in television public service announcements produced by the Progressive Corporation. The announcements featured his voice reminding drivers to "buckle up" their seat belts. Traffic signs depicting a stylized E.T. wearing one were installed on selected roads around the United States. The following year, British Telecommunications launched the "Stay in Touch" campaign, with him as the star of various advertisements. The campaign's slogan was "B.T. has E.T.", with "E.T." also taken to mean "extra technology".

At Spielberg's suggestion, George Lucas included members of E.T.'s species as background characters in Star Wars: Episode I – The Phantom Menace. E.T. was one of the franchises featured in the 2015 crossover game Lego Dimensions. E.T. appears as one of the playable characters, and a world based on the film where players can receive side quests from the characters is available. During E.T.'s trailer in the sketch for the series known as Meet that Hero!, Supergirl explains his backstory and how they have many things in common, including being aliens that crashed down to Earth and how they both have superpowers that they use to help other people.

== Reception and legacy ==
Like the film, the character of E.T. has been acclaimed by critics, who praised him for his child-like nature, sympathetic personality, originality in appearance and voice design, and his human-like emotions. The character's catchphrase "E.T. phone home" was ranked 15th on AFI's 100 Years...100 Movie Quotes list, and 48th on Premiere's top movie quote list. In 2007, a waxwork of E.T. was put on display at various Madame Tussauds locations worldwide. In 2023, Comic Book Resources ranked E.T. at number 2 on its list of the "Most Iconic Characters From Steven Spielberg Films", writing "Despite being nothing more than an animatronic puppet behind the scenes, E.T. is one of the most beloved and recognizable characters from Steven Spielberg's vast filmography. The extra-terrestrial's limited speech doesn't stop him from immediately endearing himself to audiences with his sweet personality and healing touch." The Washington Post credited "some of the movie's remarkable success [...] to E.T. himself" writing "He remains one of the most soulful, expressive special effects ever conceived...E.T. has personality and character and emotion, and he moves like a living thing."
