= Space Fantasy – The Ride =

Roller coaster

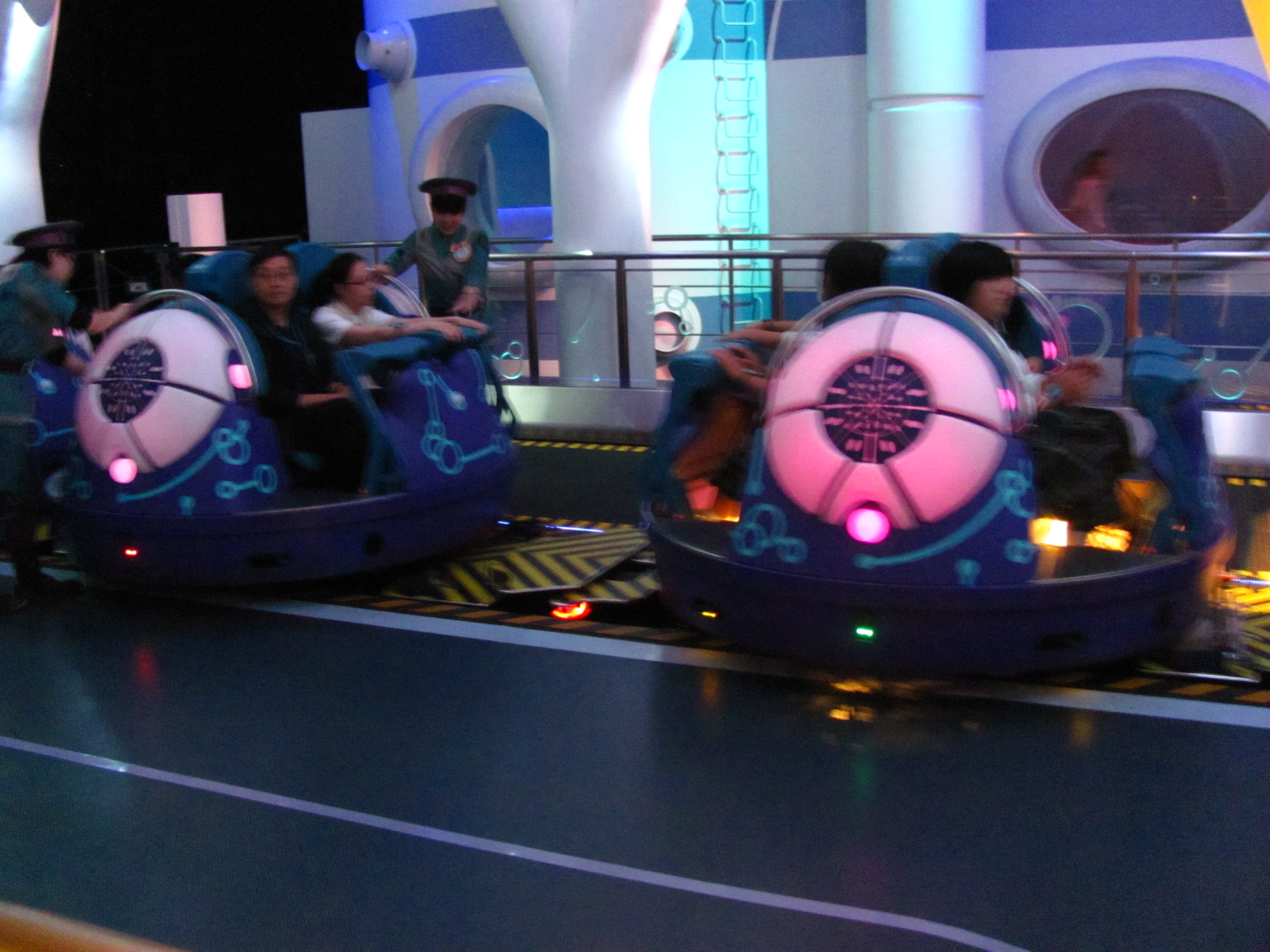

Universal Studios Japan
- Location: Universal Studios Japan
- Park section: Hollywood
- Coordinates: 34.6653°N 135.4357°E
- Status: Operating
- Opening date: March 18, 2010
- Replaced: E.T. Adventure (2001–2009)

General statistics
- Type: Steel – Spinning – Enclosed
- Manufacturer: Mack Rides
- Designer: Universal Creative
- Model: Custom
- Lift/launch system: 3 friction wheel-powered lift hills
- Height: 7 m (23 ft)
- Length: 585 m (1,919 ft)
- Inversions: 0
- Duration: 275 seconds
- Capacity: 1920 riders per hour
- Height restriction: 102 cm (3 ft 4 in)
- Trains: 19 trains with 2 cars; riders arranged 2 across in 2 rows for a total of 8 riders per train
- Universal Express available
- Single rider line available
- Space Fantasy – The Ride at RCDB

Space Fantasy – The Ride (スペース・ファンタジー・ザ・ライド,, Supēsu fantajī za raido) is a spinning roller coaster at Universal Studios Japan in Osaka, Japan. The ride opened on March 18, 2010, as a replacement for the E.T. Adventure dark ride. The ride is themed to a journey through space and features an array of special effects and immersive theming including interactive projection screens, on-board audio, lasers and fibre optics.

== History ==
In March 2009, Universal Studios Japan announced that they would be closing E.T. Adventure on May 10, 2009. Following the ride's closure in May, the ride system was removed with Universal Studios Japan temporarily reopening the attraction as a walkthrough attraction for five days from July 18, 2009.

On September 14, 2009, the park announced a new indoor ride would open in 2010, replacing in E.T. Adventure. Although Universal Studios Japan did not announce full details of the attraction, they did state it would be space-themed and measure 585 metres (1,919 ft) long. Less than one month later, the park announced their new ride's name would be Space Fantasy – The Ride. In December 2009, Universal Studios Japan stated the ride was scheduled to open on March 18, 2010. On March 18, 2010, Space Fantasy – The Ride officially opened to the public.

The ride is often overlaid to work with VR for half a year in order to promote the Cool Japan campaign.

== Characteristics ==
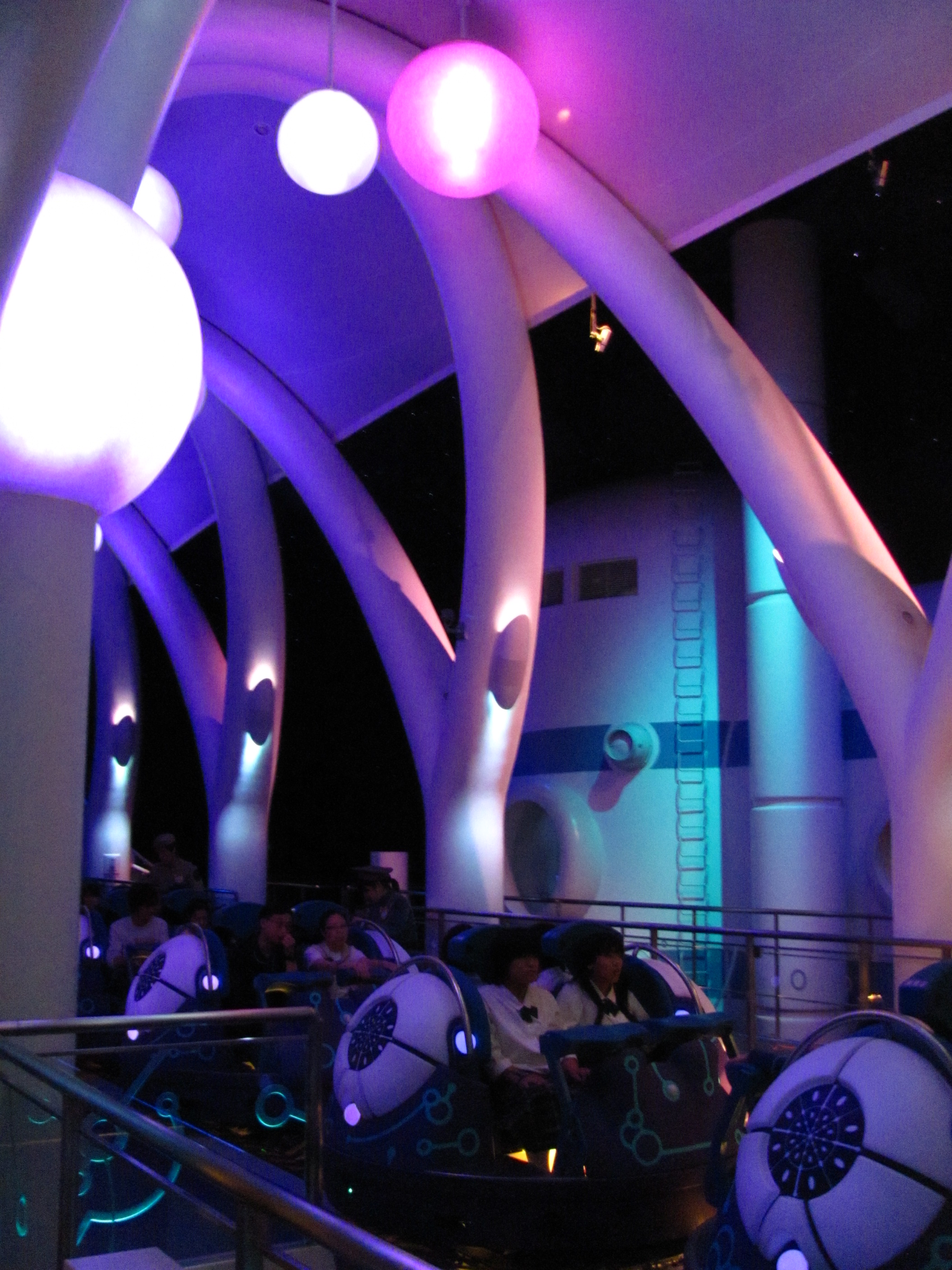
Two trains in Space Fantasy – The Ride's station

Space Fantasy – The Ride is a spinning roller coaster manufactured by Mack Rides, a German amusement ride manufacturer. The ride was custom-built so it could fit within the existing show building, formerly used for the E.T. Adventure ride.

=== Statistics ===
The 585-metre-long (1,919 ft) ride is enclosed in a show building 19 metres (62 ft) high with a floor area measuring 72 by 89 metres (236 by 292 ft). The ride features three friction wheel-powered lift hills which take the ride to its maximum height of 7 metres (23 ft). Space Fantasy – The Ride reaches a top speed of 11 metres per second (36 ft/s) over the course of its 275-second ride. The trains are themed as solar shuttles.

=== Trains ===
Space Fantasy – The Ride features nineteen 8-person trains catering for an hourly capacity of 1920 riders. Each train features a pair four-seater cars. Riders are grouped in pairs and sit back-to-back on the round vehicles. The trains are fitted with on-board speakers which provide a soundtrack throughout the roller coaster ride, as well as monitors which display various items relevant to the ride's theme and storyline. Riders must be at least 122 centimetres (48 in) tall to ride alone or 102 centimetres (40 in) tall if accompanied by an adult.

=== Theme ===
Space Fantasy – The Ride is themed as a journey through space. Riders begin their journey on planet Earth with the objective of restoring life to the sun by collecting stardust. Their journey takes them past many planets including Saturn and Mercury, as well as past voids, stars, nebulae and comets. To help develop this theme, Universal Studios Japan contracted American-based interactive technology firm GestureTek. GestureTek's 3D camera tracking technology and multi-touch technology was employed to recognise gestures of guests both in the queue and on board the ride.

== Ride experience ==
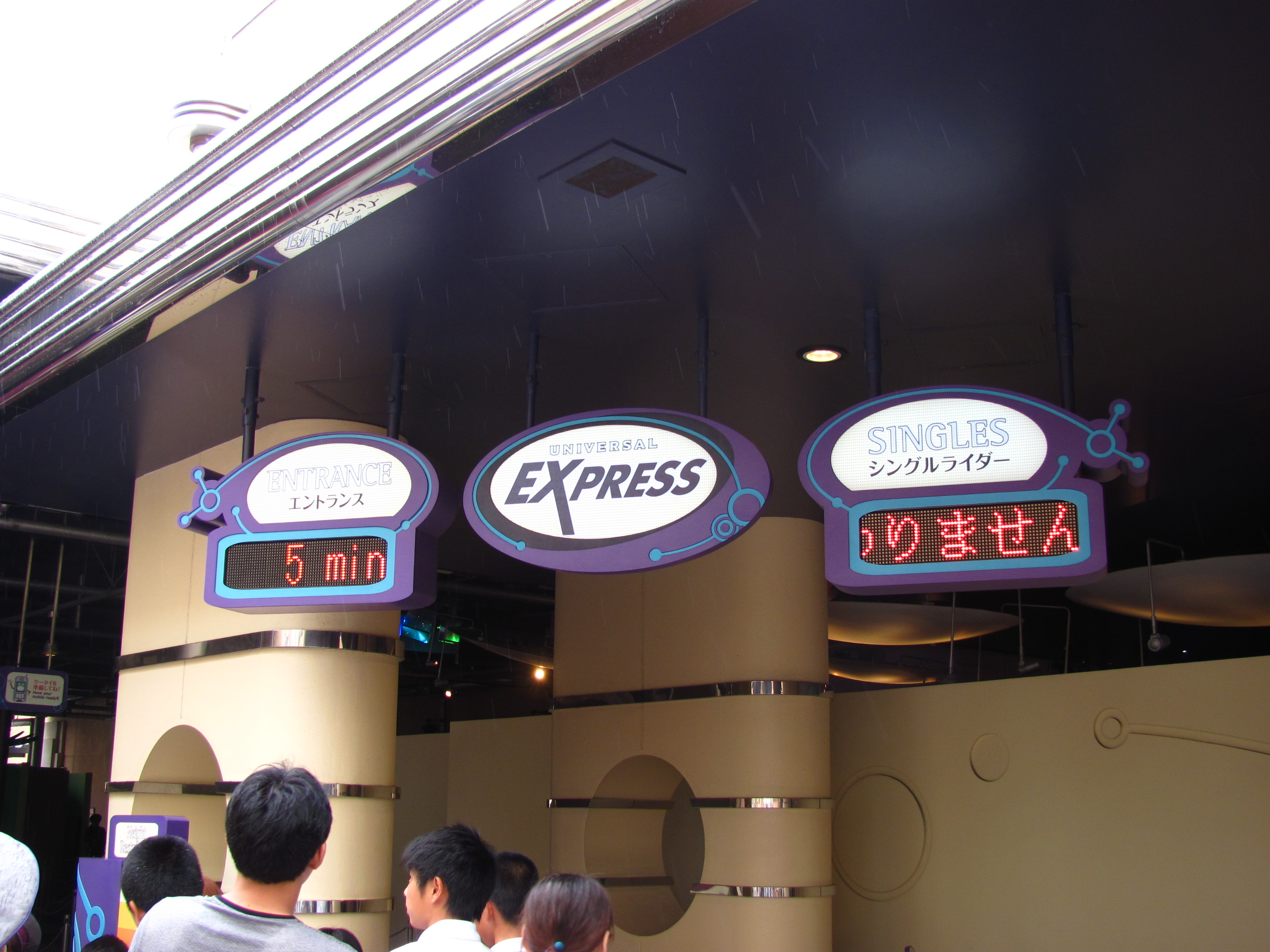
The ride's entrance with signs for its three queue lines

Riders enter the queue for Space Fantasy – The Ride from the Hollywood section of Universal Studios Japan. As part of the ride's theme, queue features an 85-foot-long (26 m) wall which is able to recognise the movements of up 132 hands on 66 guests without them physically having to touch the wall. The wall is powered by 22 3D cameras and 13 projectors connected to an array of 16 quad core computers. Space Fantasy – The Ride features separate queues for single riders and holders of Universal Express Passes, as well as offering "child switch" where one parent can experience the ride while the other parent looks after their child before switching their roles.

The station of the roller coaster features a conveyor belt loading system. This system allows the ride to achieve its relatively high throughput of 1920 riders per hour. Once the trains are loaded they are dispatched up the first lift hills. On one of the lift hills, riders are able to interact with the surrounding screens by effectively collecting "stardust clouds" to help power the sun. Aside from interactive technologies, Space Fantasy – The Ride also features a collection of standard projection screens, lasers, fiber optics. Throughout the 275-second ride, the individual four-seater cars perform both magnetic-controlled spins and uncontrolled spins; the latter relies on the riders' weight distribution coupled with the force of gravity. After navigating the 585-metre (1,919 ft) track, the trains return to the station where riders disembark and return to Universal Studios Japan's Hollywood themed area.

== Reception ==
Space Fantasy – The Ride has generally been well received. Park World Magazine stated the ride is "packed with exciting features and fun theming". They also commended the ride for its "controlled car movements and added effects", when compared with other spinning roller coasters. Christina Warren of Mashable provided a review of the ride's special effects, describing them as incredible. Warren also stated she "can't wait for some of this technology to hit American theme parks".

In November 2011, Space Fantasy – The Ride received a Thea Award For Outstanding Achievement. The 18th Annual Thea Awards were presented by the Themed Entertainment Association (TEA) and held at the International Association of Amusement Parks and Attractions (IAAPA) trade show in Orlando, Florida. TEA described the ride as "a thrilling experience that delivers an engaging story using advanced effects in a meaningful way, making an on-the-spot connection with its target audience".

Although the ride did not receive a ranking in its debut year, Space Fantasy – The Ride ranked 91 out of 365 roller coasters featured in the worldwide Best Roller Coaster Poll. The Best Roller Coaster Poll is recognised by park owners and enthusiasts alike, due to its ranking algorithm which prevents the poll from being purely a popularity contest.

== XR Ride ==
During special events such as Universal Cool Japan, Space Fantasy may receive a temporary overlay where it operates as an "XR Ride". During an "XR Ride" guests can experience the world of each themed overlay in 360 degrees while wearing VR goggles. During these overlays, the ride vehicle is altered so that it does not rotate, and only the front seats are used. In addition, guests under 132 cm tall cannot ride the XR ride even if accompanied by a guardian.

- Kyary Pamyu Pamyu XR Ride (January 15, 2016 – June 26, 2016) - First introduced as part of Universal Cool Japan 2016.
- Evangelion XR Ride (January 13, 2017 – June 25, 2017) - Introduced as part of Universal Cool Japan 2017.
- Final Fantasy XR Ride (January 19, 2018 – June 24, 2018) - Introduced as part of Universal Cool Japan 2018.
- Evangelion XR Ride (July 6, 2018 – January 6, 2019) - It was brought back in response to many guests' requests for its return.
- Lupin the Third Car Chase XR Ride (January 18, 2019 – June 23, 2019) - Introduced as part of Universal Cool Japan 2019.
- Attack on Titan XR Ride (January 21, 2020 – July 5, 2020 ) - Introduced as part of Universal Cool Japan 2020.
- "STAND BY ME Doraemon 2" XR Ride ( August 4, 2020 – January 6, 2021) - Introduced in collaboration with "STAND BY ME Doraemon 2" to commemorate the 50th anniversary of Doraemon.
- Demon Slayer: Kimetsu no Yaiba XR Ride: Mugen Train (September 17, 2021 - February 13, 2022, February 1, 2024 - June 9, 2024) - Introduced in collaboration with Demon Slayer: Kimetsu no Yaiba.
- Attack on Titan XR Ride (March 4, 2022 – July 22, 2022) - Introduced as a revival of the 2020 ride as part of Universal Cool Japan 2022.
- Doraemon XR Ride: Nobita and the Sky Utopia (February 23, 2023 - September 3, 2023) - Introduced in collaboration with the movie "Doraemon: Nobita and the Sky Utopia."
- Demon Slayer XR Ride ~Race through the Swordsmith Village~ (July 19, 2024 - January 5, 2025)
- Spy x Family XR Ride (July 1, 2025 - January 4, 2026) - Introduced in collaboration with Spy x Family as part of Universal Cool Japan 2025.
- Space Fantasy - The Ride: CLUB ZEDD REMIX (2026) - A special collaboration to commemorate the 25th anniversary of the opening of Universal Studios Japan.
- Girls und Panzer XR Ride (2027 - 2028) - Introduced in collaboration with Girls und Panzer as part of Universal Cool Japan 2027.
