= Pat Welsh (actress) =

American actress (1915–1995)

- Welsh, c. 1980s
- Born: Patricia Anderson Carroll; February 11, 1915; San Francisco, California, U.S.
- Died: January 26, 1995 (aged 79); Green Valley, Arizona, U.S.
- Occupation: Actress
- Years active: 1940–1983
- Spouse: Tom Welsh (m. 1961)

Patricia Anderson Welsh (née Carroll; February 11, 1915 – January 26, 1995) was an American actress. She was known as the raspy voice of E.T. in the 1982 film E.T. the Extra-Terrestrial.

== Career ==
Welsh was a radio soap opera actress and only appeared in three films, all uncredited. The only movie in which she was seen was the 1940 World War I film Waterloo Bridge.

She was the voice of E.T. in the 1982 film E.T. the Extra-Terrestrial. As a chain smoker, she had a raspy voice that gave E.T. his trademark speech sound. She also had been hired by George Lucas to be the voice of Boushh in the 1983 film Return of the Jedi.

Welsh provided the voices for E.T, Tickli and Magdol in the E.T. Adventure ride at Universal Studios Florida, which opened in 1990.

== Personal life and death ==
Welsh died of pneumonia on January 26, 1995, in Green Valley, Arizona.

== Filmography ==
Year	Title	Role	Notes
1940	Waterloo Bridge		Uncredited
1982	E.T. the Extra-Terrestrial	E.T. (voice)	Uncredited
1983	Return of the Jedi	Boushh (voice)	Uncredited
