= John O'Neill (video game designer) =

British video game designer (??–2021)

- Died: 2021
- Occupation: Video game designer
- Years active: 1980s – 2021
- Known for: Lifespan; The Dolphin's Rune

John O'Neill (died in 2021) was a British artist and video game designer best known for developing the games Lifespan and The Dolphin's Rune. He is one of the earliest art game designers, and his work has been compared to that of contemporary game designer, Jaron Lanier.

== Career ==
=== Early life and founding of Admacadiam ===
John O'Neill grew up in Northern England and began to experiment with painting at a young age. His interest in art continued throughout the 1960s, his academic career eventually leading him to study art at the Bath School of Art and Design and at London's Chelsea College of Art and Design where he would exhibit his work publicly. O'Neill's approach to art in his 20s was experimental in nature and he explored diverse media including painting, sculpture, and music. His experiences in exhibiting his work in London in 1971 at the age of 23, however, led him to make dramatic changes in the interest of gaining as broad an audience as possible. Turning to consumer channels (mass publication and broadcasting) in 1975, O'Neill developed a philosophy he called "Admcadiam" that was geared toward outreach to the general public and he formed Admacadiam – a company striving to serve as a "creative catalyst" in producing art for the masses. Alongside his work at Admacadiam, O'Neill would continue to display gallery art corresponding to his "Admcadiam" philosophy, and he also moonlighted as a guest lecturer at universities and art institutes.

As a reaction against institutional art, "Admcadiam" suggests that art is only important as it affects ordinary people and it promotes the enhancement of accessibility of art by emphasising mass production and affordability. Accordingly, Admacadiam's early art products included diverse items like postcards, board games, decals, cards, and books. Many of these products were commercially unsuccessful and the company struggled until a meeting with educator David D. Thornburg at Stanford University prompted O'Neill to relocate from London to Silicon Valley and to refocus his artistic efforts on interactive computer art.

=== Flyghts of Fancie ===
Working as co-designer together with Childware's Ramone Zamora for a short time, the first video game O'Neill became involved with was Atari, Inc.'s E.T. Phone Home! where O'Neill was the graphic designer.

In 1982, during his time working for Atari, O'Neill also began a side project with close friend and Atari product manager Stuart Rosen under a newly created video game branch of Admacadiam called Flyghts of Fancie. This project, originally called simply Life, would eventually become O'Neill's first independent game, the critically acclaimed art game, Lifespan. Fitting with Admacadiam's goal of making art accessible for the masses, the central consideration for Flyghts of Fancie would be the player's experience including aesthetic enjoyment as well as reflective thought leading to meaningful personal insights. Unlike the vast majority of contemporary video games that emphasised frenetic action, violence, and the collection of points, Lifespan was a slow-paced and surrealistic pastiche of five episodes that led the player through events representative of the human experience from childhood to death. The game was distributed by the Chicago-based Roklan Corporation, receiving a favourable critical response and it was compared to contemporary art game, Moondust, by writers including its designer Jaron Lanier.

O'Neill's next game with Flyghts of Fancie was M.O.R.L. (standing for Middle Of the Road Lizard – i.e. a centrist lounge lizard). In the allegorical M.O.R.L., the player works to keep the evolving main character in the center of a path as too much time spent on either side of the playing field will injure the player. To closer connect the player to the player character, an image of the character's brain is displayed to reveal how the player's movements influence its psychological health.

While M.O.R.L. was under development for Roklan, Flyghts of Fancie's third game was being produced for distribution by Reston Software. This multiplayer game, entitled Day, has players traversing a landscape in an attempt to gain different perspectives on activities. Another symbolism-heavy title, O'Neill's goal with Day was to make the player consider the process whereby dreams lead to intentions which then lead to actions and thence to memories before decaying back into dreams again.

Flyghts of Fancie's fourth game represented an ambitious joint effort with writer Dale Peterson to put the player in the mind of a dolphin. Designed in consultation with dolphin researcher and psychonaut, John C. Lilly, The Dolphin's Rune presented environmental messages as well as exploring the issues of dolphin intelligence and interspecies communication. The game was well received by critics and it has come to be considered an art game in the same vein as the earlier Lifespan. The audio elements of The Dolphin's Rune were especially singled out by reviewers as providing an essential element of the gameplay experience and achieving the high degree of player immersion that O'Neill had intended.

The final project under development by Flyghts of Fancie before it was shut down to allow O'Neill to pursue a television deal with Time–Life (as well as the production of video discs and satellite networking) was a collaboration with cartoonist Gahan Wilson. The game was to be titled Gahan Wilson's House of Horrors, and the title was to be financed by Electronic Arts, however it was cancelled prior to release and would not be completed until nearly a decade later in 1993 as The Ultimate Haunted House.

=== Game Whys ===
In 2001, inspired by his daughter Oona, O'Neill returned to game design with the artisanal board game Paradice. Released by O'Neill's See Through Games, Paradice was the first offering under O'Neill's new project, Game Whys: Art and Philosophy Games for an Emerging Humanity. The environmentally-oriented game was released in standard (wooden pieces) and deluxe (resin materials) formats and is intended to be as much an art piece as a game.

Board games and toys continued to be the main focus of Admcadiam's efforts for the next several years, and by 2005 O'Neill began to exhibit games at the American International Toy Fair. By 2009, the company's products had grown to include tarot and card games as well, including a card-game version of boardgames like Paradice.

== Works ==
=== Films ===
- Day (TM) (Avalanche Productions/La Mamelle, 1982)

=== Video games ===
- E.T. Phone Home! (Atari, Inc., Atari 8-bit, C64, 1983)
- Lifespan (Roklan, Atari 8-bit, 1983)
- M.O.R.L. (Roklan, Atari 8-bit, 1984)
- Day (Reston, Atari 8-bit, 1985)
- The Dolphin's Rune: A Poetic Odyssey (originally released by Reston as The Dolphin's Pearl) (Mindscape, C64, 1985)
- Gahan Wilson's House of Horrors (Electronic Arts, Apple II. It was cancelled then completed for Mac in 1993 as The Ultimate Haunted House.

=== Board games and card games ===
- Paradice (See Through Games, 2001; rereleased by GameWhys in 2010)
- Leaves (EOS Games, 2008; developed jointly with Dave Greulich)
- Ice Cap (GameWhys, 2009)
- SkyGarden (GameWhys, 2013)
- I Lands (GameWhys, 2014)
- mOre (GameWhys, 2015)
- Occupy Your Life (GameWhys, 2016)
