= Tamara De Treaux =

American actress (1959–1990)

- Born: Tamara Detro; October 21, 1959; California, U.S.
- Died: November 28, 1990 (aged 31); North Hollywood, Los Angeles, California, U.S.
- Occupation: Actress
- Known for: E.T. the Extra-Terrestrial; Verified shortest-ever actress

Tamara Detro (October 21, 1959 – November 28, 1990), known by the stage name Tamara De Treaux, was an American actress. She was best known for her role in film E.T. the Extra-Terrestrial. She stood 31 inches tall and had dwarfism.

== Career ==
De Treaux played one of the three creatures in John Newland's horror TV movie Don't Be Afraid of the Dark (1973), which was her first film role. Making the prosthetics for De Treaux to play a "gnome-like creature" took some special adaptations, according to John Chambers. After Don't Be Afraid of the Dark, she played on stage in the Dickens Faire and also did commercials. For Little Miss Marker (1980), she worked as a stand-in for the child actress. De Treaux later worked with a singing group in San Francisco called the Medflies in 1980. At one of the Medflies' performance in Los Angeles, she was noticed by Steven Spielberg. She became one of the performers who played E.T. in Spielberg's film E.T. the Extra-Terrestrial (1982). De Treaux's work in Ghoulies (1985) was praised by Michael Wilmington in the Los Angeles Times who hated the movie, but enjoyed her performance.

De Treaux went back to the stage, appearing in Divinas Palabras by Ramón del Valle-Inclán in 1989 in Los Angeles in a performance staged by The Bilingual Foundation for the Arts. De Treaux was one of the models in Daphne and Apollo, Los Angeles (1990), photographed by Joel Peter Witkin.

She was a friend of the American writer Armistead Maupin. Her diaries supplied the main influence for the heroine "Cadence Roth" in his novel Maybe the Moon.

== Personal life ==
De Treaux stood at 31 inches tall and had dwarfism. She was the verified shortest ever actress. She first became interested in acting at age 13.

She was a 1978 graduate of San Leandro High School, San Leandro, California. De Treaux made many of her own clothes.

In 1990, she died at age 31 from respiratory and heart problems at the North Hollywood Medical Center and is buried at Forest Lawn Memorial Park (Hollywood Hills).

== Filmography ==
| Year | Title | Role | Notes |
|---|---|---|---|
| 1973 | Don't Be Afraid of the Dark | Creature | TV movie |
| 1980 | Little Miss Marker | | |
| 1983 | E.T. the Extra-Terrestrial | E.T. | |
| 1984 | Ghoulies | Greedigut | |
| 1990 | Rockula | Bat Dork | |
| 1991 | The Linguine Incident | Camile | |
| 1991 | Ted & Venus | Park Bench Lover | (final film role) |
