= E.T. Adventure =

Ride at Universal Studios Orlando

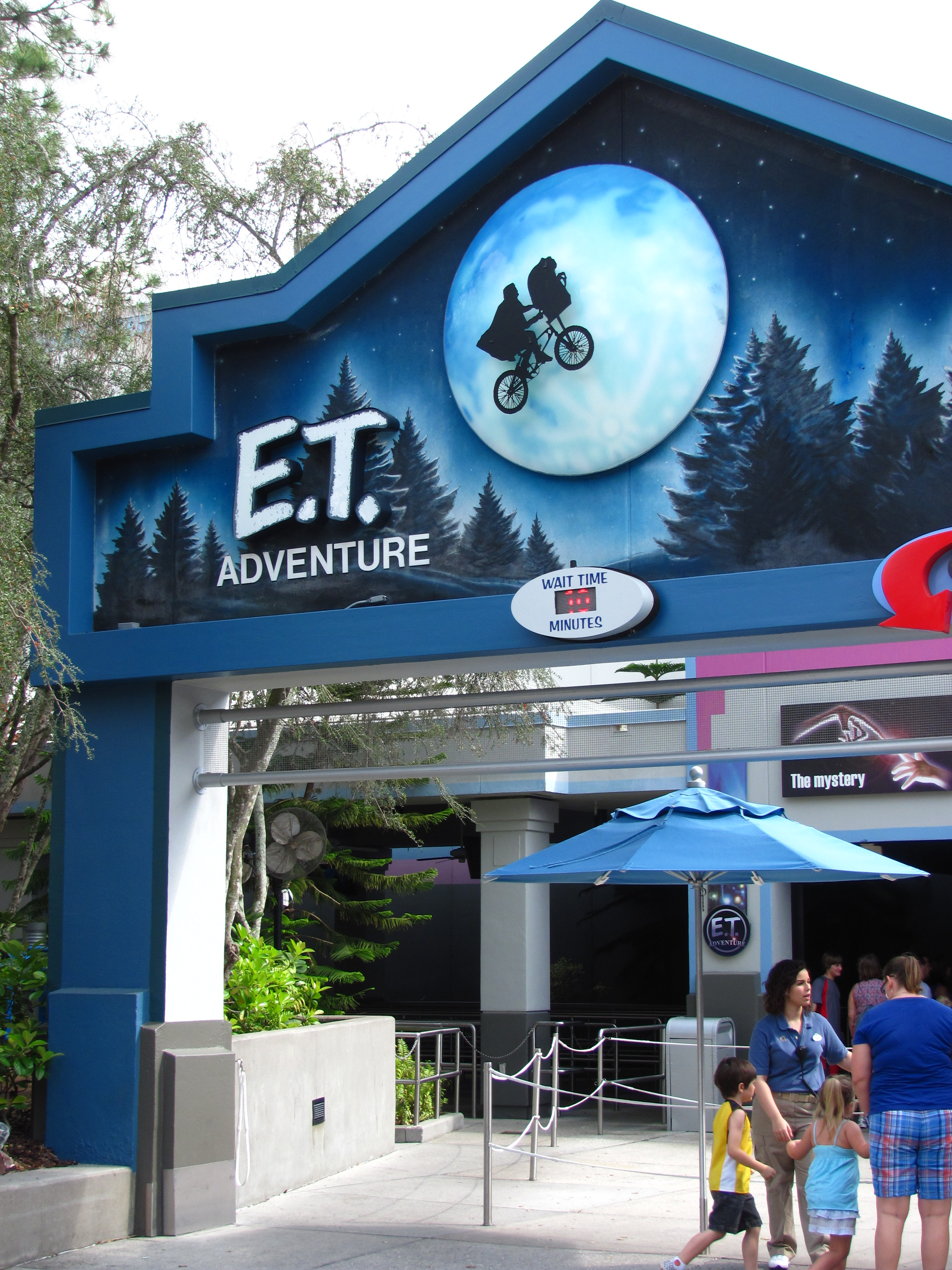
- The entrance at Universal Studios Florida

Universal Studios Florida
- Area: Expo Center (1990–1999); Woody Woodpecker's KidZone (1999–2024); Hollywood (2024–Present)
- Status: Operating
- Opening date: June 7, 1990

Universal Studios Hollywood
- Area: Lower Lot
- Status: Removed
- Opening date: June 12, 1991
- Closing date: March 14, 2003
- Replaced by: Revenge of the Mummy

Universal Studios Japan
- Area: Hollywood
- Status: Removed
- Opening date: March 31, 2001
- Closing date: May 10, 2009
- Replaced by: Space Fantasy – The Ride

Ride statistics
- Attraction type: Suspended dark ride
- Manufacturers: Universal Creative; Sally Corporation; Birket Engineering; Mannetron
- Designer: Universal Creative
- Theme: E.T. the Extra-Terrestrial
- Music: John Williams
- Height: 12 ft (3.7 m)
- Speed: 5 mph (8.0 km/h)
- Vehicle type: Bikes
- Riders per vehicle: 12
- Rows: 3
- Riders per row: 4
- Duration: 4:30
- Height restriction: 34 in (86 cm)
- Pre-Show Host: Steven Spielberg
- Ride Host: E.T.
- Universal Express available
- Must transfer from wheelchair
- Closed captioning available

E.T. Adventure is a suspended dark ride located at Universal Studios Florida in Orlando, Florida, United States. Primarily designed in-house by Universal Creative in collaboration with Steven Spielberg, the ride first opened to the public at Universal Studios Florida on June 7, 1990. Guests experience the iconic flying-bicycle chase scene from Spielberg's 1982 film E.T. the Extra-Terrestrial. They are also introduced to E.T.'s homeworld, the Green Planet, which is inspired by the 1985 novel E.T.: The Book of the Green Planet by William Kotzwinkle.

E.T. Adventure features over 300 animatronics and exotic plants designed and manufactured by the Sally Corporation. Peter Alexander, a former Disney Imagineer who had earlier success with Universal's King Kong Encounter, was instrumental in the ride's development. An original score was also created for the theme park ride by John Williams, who scored the original film. Additional E.T. Adventure installations opened at Universal Studios Hollywood in 1991 and Universal Studios Japan in 2001, but only the original installation in Orlando remains in operation. It is also the only remaining ride that opened with the park in 1990.

== History ==
When King Kong Encounter – a Studio Tour attraction at Universal Studios Hollywood – was entering its final phase of construction in 1986, Steven Spielberg met with the attraction's producer and director, Peter Alexander, who was not only a former Walt Disney Imagineer but also his ex-college roommate. He wanted to see firsthand what Universal's creative teams were capable of. Spielberg had partnered with Universal in the planning of a new theme park in Orlando, Florida, but momentum for the project had stalled. Alexander gave Spielberg a preview of the 30-foot (9.1 m) King Kong animatronic in action, and he left impressed by the experience. The attraction opened a short time later and was an immediate success, causing attendance to spike and prompting Universal to revisit plans to build the Florida theme park.

One of the future attractions Spielberg began working on in 1989 was to be themed after his 1982 film E.T. the Extra-Terrestrial. Alexander worked closely with Spielberg and led Universal Creative in the creation of the dark ride attraction. Alexander found the task challenging, saying that the "emotional impact" of a two-hour-long film is "not easily translated into six or eight minute theme park rides". During development, it was suggested that the chase scene from the film would transition into a voyage through E.T.'s homeworld, the Green Planet. Spielberg liked the idea but emphasized the importance of keeping the story "personal". He wanted guests to have a "personal moment" with E.T. and for the Green Planet to be depicted as a "friendly place".

Following Spielberg's advice, the scenes depicting the Green Planet were designed to be both "alien" and "friendly". Inspiration was drawn from E.T.: The Book of the Green Planet, a novel by William Kotzwinkle in 1985 that serves as a written sequel to the 1982 film. The character Botanicus and the shape of E.T.'s home featured in the attraction were directly influenced by the book, as were the many plant-like creatures. Alexander also channeled his childhood experiences with coral reefs off the coast of California, which he recalled had the appearance of an "alien landscape". Underwater plant research was conducted and used by art directors to also aid in plant design.

Sally Corporation was brought in to assist, designing and manufacturing over 300 animatronics and plants. John Williams, who composed music for the theatrical film, created an original score specifically for the new attraction.

To enhance the personal connection with guests, Alexander came up with the idea that an audio-animatronic E.T. in the final scene would thank each rider by name when saying goodbye. Universal tasked Birket Engineering with the design and implementation of the computer system, which can recognize as many as 20,000 names. Guests entering the pre-show queue supply their name to a ride attendant and receive an "interplanetary passport" in return. Each passport contains a barcode that stores a name, which is then transferred to an RFID tag on the vehicle as each rider boards, identifying all of the occupants to the computer system.

The completed ride opened as E.T. Adventure during the grand opening of Universal Studios Florida in 1990. Another instance of the ride opened at Universal Studios Hollywood in 1991, followed by a third at Universal Studios Japan in 2001. The Hollywood version closed on March 14, 2003, and was replaced by Revenge of the Mummy: The Ride. The Japanese installation closed on May 10, 2009, and was replaced by Space Fantasy – The Ride. The E.T. Adventure in Orlando became the last remaining in operation and later received a refurbishment in 2017. An E.T. Adventure was expected to open at Universal Studios South Korea in 2021, but plans for the theme park were scrapped.

In 2012, the last remaining installation received new track switches by Dynamic Structures. Over the years, the section of the theme park where the ride is situated has changed several times. It was originally located in the Expo Center of the park in 1990, an area that was split into World Expo and Woody Woodpecker's KidZone (containing E.T. Adventure) in 1999. The ride became a part of the Hollywood area in 2024 during the retheming of Woody Woodpecker's KidZone, which was renamed DreamWorks Land. During this retheme of Woody Woodpecker’s KidZone, the exit was temporarily rerouted through the preshow. An archway was added outside the entrance to block the path to E.T from the new 2024 DreamWorks Land. When the retheming of KidZone was finished, the exit was returned to its regular route.

== Ride description ==
=== Cast ===
- Steven Spielberg as himself (pre-show video)
- Pat Welsh as E.T., Tickli Moot Moot, Magdol (voices)
- Ron Knight as Botanicus, Orbidon, NASA scientist, radiation patrolman, sheriffs (voices)

=== Exterior queue ===
The building housing E.T. Adventure at Universal Studios Florida, along with portions of its exterior line queue, are themed to a sound stage where E.T. is being filmed. TV monitors overhead display E.T. trivia as well as clips of various film crew members discussing their experiences during the production of the film. Posters of the film's 30th Anniversary re-release, in English and various other languages, are on display near the end of the exterior queue where the pre-show takes place.

=== Pre-show ===
Before entering the interior queue, Steven Spielberg appears on several overhead TV screens telling guests that E.T.'s teacher Botanicus has asked E.T. to return to his home world, the Green Planet, because life there is dying. Only E.T.'s magical healing touch can save the planet and its inhabitants, so it is up to the guests to bring him home. Spielberg describes that guests will make their journey on bikes, as a ride vehicle is shown on screen. He also explains the need for guests to give their name to one of his "assistants", and in return they will receive an "interplanetary passport". The passport is a card containing a barcode that corresponds to the name given, entered by a ride attendant into a computer; an E.T. animatronic will speak each name later in the ride's finale. Following the pre-show video, entrance doors automatically open and reveal another room where guests will receive their passport cards before moving into the interior queue.

Prior to the ride's refurbishment in 2002 celebrating the film's 20th anniversary, the pre-show displayed a different video with Spielberg telling guests they were being cast as actors in new scenes inspired by the original film. The passports were instead described as "passes" that allowed access on set, and ride attendants were referred to as "stagehands".

=== Interior queue ===
Inside the interior queue is a dark forest setting filled with redwood trees, which resembles the scene in the film where E.T. is trying to evade police capture, along with the smell of pine that fills the queue. An animatronic Botanicus periodically rises from the cracking earth in a majestic and ominous fashion. The crowd are presented with a glorious light display accompanied with thick plumes of smoke. Botanicus the Great pleads for E.T.'s return, in a tearful soliloquy. He takes it upon himself to give the people informative lore concerning every possible aspect of the ride they may need. Along the queue line, guests pass by the communication device E.T. constructed in the film to phone home, including a Speak & Spell prop that actively displays the letters H-E-L-P E-T one at a time. An animatronic rabbit is somewhat hidden within the queue, referencing the one that appears in the film's opening. A glowing red heart can also be seen on occasion moving through the trees, meant to signify E.T.'s run from police in the film. The queue ends at the loading platform where guests board ride vehicles.

=== Ride ===
Each individual seat is a bicycle, whose handles come down as the lap bars. The bike in the middle of the front row contains E.T. However, in the attraction's early years, guests also had the option of riding in a spaceship modeled after the one that E.T. came to Earth on in the movie; these ride vehicles were removed as guests preferred to ride the bikes, given how iconic they were in the famous flying scene in the movie.

The vehicles travel past NASA and police officials who give chase and try to arrest the riders and capture E.T. As they are about to be caught, a police car appears out of nowhere and just as they are about to hit it, the bicycles begin to fly over the city and then into outer space. From their bikes, the guests can see a miniature city below, including real moving cars and even a football stadium and two baseball fields.

The bikes are then transported to a kind of portal area with flashing lights which, when finally turned around, arrive at the Green Planet. The guests then encounter Botanicus, who urges the visitors to save E.T.'s friends.

E.T.'s healing touch travels through the Green Planet, reviving his friends and beginning a celebration with numerous baby E.T.s frolicking, banging on drums, swinging on ropes and crying out in joy. This lasts for about 3 minutes and is a huge contrast to the beginning; the beginning is dark and scary while this part of the ride is a beautiful symphony of joy, with spurting water and singing. At the end, the guests pass an animatronic E.T. (voiced by Pat Welsh) who thanks them all by the names that they gave to the travel agents/Spielberg's assistants. Then, in a flash of light, guests are sent back to Earth and into the unload area. As guests leave the ride, they can sometimes hear E.T.'s voice reminding them, "I'll be right here."

== Incidents ==
On February 17, 1992, a 9-year-old girl injured her leg while stepping in front of a moving platform of Hollywood's version of the ride. On October 15, 1996, a 28-year-old man fell 10 to 12 feet from the ride's platform in Florida while trying to step into the vehicle. He was taken to Orlando Regional Medical Center and treated for his injuries. In November 2004, a 35-year-old woman got her hand stuck in a safety bar of Japan's version of the ride as an employee pulled it down to secure it. The woman suffered nerve damage in her right wrist, resulting in the loss of use of two of her fingers and, ultimately, losing her job. The woman sued the park and received an out-of-court settlement in 2006. On January 31, 2019, an 11-year-old boy was injured on the ride after his foot and a portion of his leg became stuck between the moving vehicle and the cement boarding platform. A lawsuit was filed by the boy's mother seeking $15,000 in damages, claiming that multiple bones were broken requiring surgery.

== See also ==
- Incidents at Universal parks § E.T. Adventure
- List of amusement rides based on film franchises
