= Lifespan (video game) =

1984 video game

- Developer: John O'Neill
- Publishers: Roklan (cartridge); Antic Software (disk)
- Platform: Atari 8-bit
- Release: 1983: Roklan; 1985: Antic
- Genre: Simulation

Lifespan is a video game written by John O'Neill for Atari 8-bit computers. It was published on cartridge by Roklan in 1983, then released on disk in 1985 by Antic Software.

== Gameplay ==
Lifespan is a slow-paced and surrealistic pastiche of five episodes.

== Reception ==
George Kopp for Electronic Fun with Computers & Games said "As it stands, Lifespan's gameplay doesn't quite live up to expectations (or Expectations). I think it will have a lot of fans, though, and if you're looking to buy your shrink a birthday present, consider it."
