= E.T. the Extra-Terrestrial =

1982 film by Steven Spielberg

- Theatrical release poster by John Alvin
- Directed by: Steven Spielberg
- Written by: Melissa Mathison
- Produced by: Kathleen Kennedy; Steven Spielberg
- Starring: Dee Wallace; Peter Coyote; Henry Thomas
- Cinematography: Allen Daviau
- Edited by: Carol Littleton
- Music by: John Williams
- Production companies: Universal Pictures; Amblin Entertainment
- Distributed by: Universal Pictures
- Release dates: May 26, 1982 (Cannes); June 11, 1982 (United States)
- Running time: 114 minutes
- Country: United States
- Language: English
- Budget: $10.5 million
- Box office: $797.3 million

E.T. the Extra-Terrestrial (or simply E.T.) is a 1982 American science fantasy film produced and directed by Steven Spielberg and written by Melissa Mathison. It tells the story of Elliott, a boy who befriends an extraterrestrial that he names E.T. who has been stranded on Earth. Along with his friends and family, Elliott must find a way to help E.T. find his way home. The film stars Dee Wallace, Henry Thomas, Peter Coyote, Robert MacNaughton, and Drew Barrymore.

The film's concept was based on an imaginary friend that Spielberg created after his parents' divorce. In 1980, Spielberg met Mathison and developed a new story from the unrealized project Night Skies. In less than two months, Mathison wrote the first draft of the script, titled E.T. and Me, which went through two rewrites. The project was rejected by Columbia Pictures, who doubted its commercial potential. Universal Pictures eventually purchased the script for $1 million. Filming took place from September to December 1981 on a budget of $10.5 million. Unlike most films, E.T. was shot in rough chronological order to facilitate convincing emotional performances from the young cast. The animatronics for the film were designed by Carlo Rambaldi.

E.T. premiered as the closing film of the Cannes Film Festival on May 26, 1982, and was released in the United States on June 11. The film was a smash hit at the box office, surpassing Star Wars (1977) to become the highest-grossing film of all time, a record it held for eleven years until Spielberg's own Jurassic Park surpassed it in 1993. E.T. received universal acclaim from critics, and is regarded as one of the greatest and most influential films ever made. It received nine nominations at the 55th Academy Awards, winning Best Original Score, Best Visual Effects, Best Sound, and Best Sound Editing in addition to being nominated for Best Picture and Best Director. It also won five Saturn Awards and two Golden Globe Awards. The film was re-released in 1985 and again in 2002 to celebrate its 20th anniversary, with altered shots, visual effects, and additional scenes. It was also re-released in IMAX on August 12, 2022, to celebrate its 40th anniversary. In 1994, the film was selected for preservation in the United States National Film Registry of the Library of Congress, who deemed it "culturally, historically, or aesthetically significant."

== Plot ==
A race of diminutive aliens visits Earth at night to gather plant specimens in a California forest. One of them separates from the group before U.S. government agents arrive. The aliens depart before the agents can find them, leaving their lone member behind. The creature takes shelter in a shed belonging to the family of ten-year-old Elliott Taylor. Initially scared by the creature, who runs away, Elliott spends the following day leaving a trail of Reese's Pieces to lure the alien back to the Taylors' home, where he hides it in his room. The following morning, Elliott feigns illness to stay home from school and play with the creature, whom he dubs E.T. Elliott introduces E.T. to his older brother Michael and five-year-old sister Gertie, who agree to keep E.T. hidden from their single mother, Mary.

When the children ask about his origins, E.T. displays telekinetic abilities by levitating several balls to represent his planetary system and later revives a dead chrysanthemum and instantly heals a cut on Elliott's finger. As Elliott and the creature bond, they share thoughts and emotions. At school, Elliott becomes intoxicated because, at home, E.T. is drinking beer. Sensing E.T.'s desire to be rescued, Elliott frees the frogs about to be vivisected in his biology class and kisses a girl he likes because E.T. is watching John Wayne kiss Maureen O'Hara in The Quiet Man.

Inspired by a Buck Rogers comic strip depicting the character calling for help with a communication device, E.T. builds a makeshift device to "phone home", using parts around the Taylor home. He also learns to speak English and requests the children's help to build the device. On Halloween, Elliott sneaks E.T. into the forest, where they set up the device to call E.T.'s people. Elliott begs E.T. to stay on Earth with him before falling asleep and waking alone in the forest the next day. Elliott returns home to his worried family while Michael searches for E.T., finding him pale and weakened in a culvert. Michael takes E.T. home, where Elliott is also growing weaker, and reveals the creature to their mother just before government agents invade and quarantine the house.

The lead agent, Keys, asks for Elliott's help to save E.T. However, E.T. dies while Elliott rapidly recovers. Left alone to say goodbye, Elliott tells E.T. that he loves him. E.T.'s heart begins to glow, and he is revived and restored to health. E.T. tells Elliott that his people are returning for him. Elliott and Michael flee with E.T. in a government vehicle. They abandon the vehicle in a playground where they meet up with Michael’s friends who await on bikes with two extra bikes for Elliott and Michael. Together they all bike towards the forest, evading pursuing authorities who are rapidly closing in on them. Heading towards a roadblock, E.T. levitates the boys to safety and lands them in the forest. E.T.'s ship arrives, and he says goodbye to Michael and Gertie, who gifts him the chrysanthemum he previously revived. E.T. places his glowing finger on Elliott's head and tells him that he will always be there. The children, Mary, and Keys observe as the ship blasts off into space, leaving a rainbow in the sky.

== Cast ==
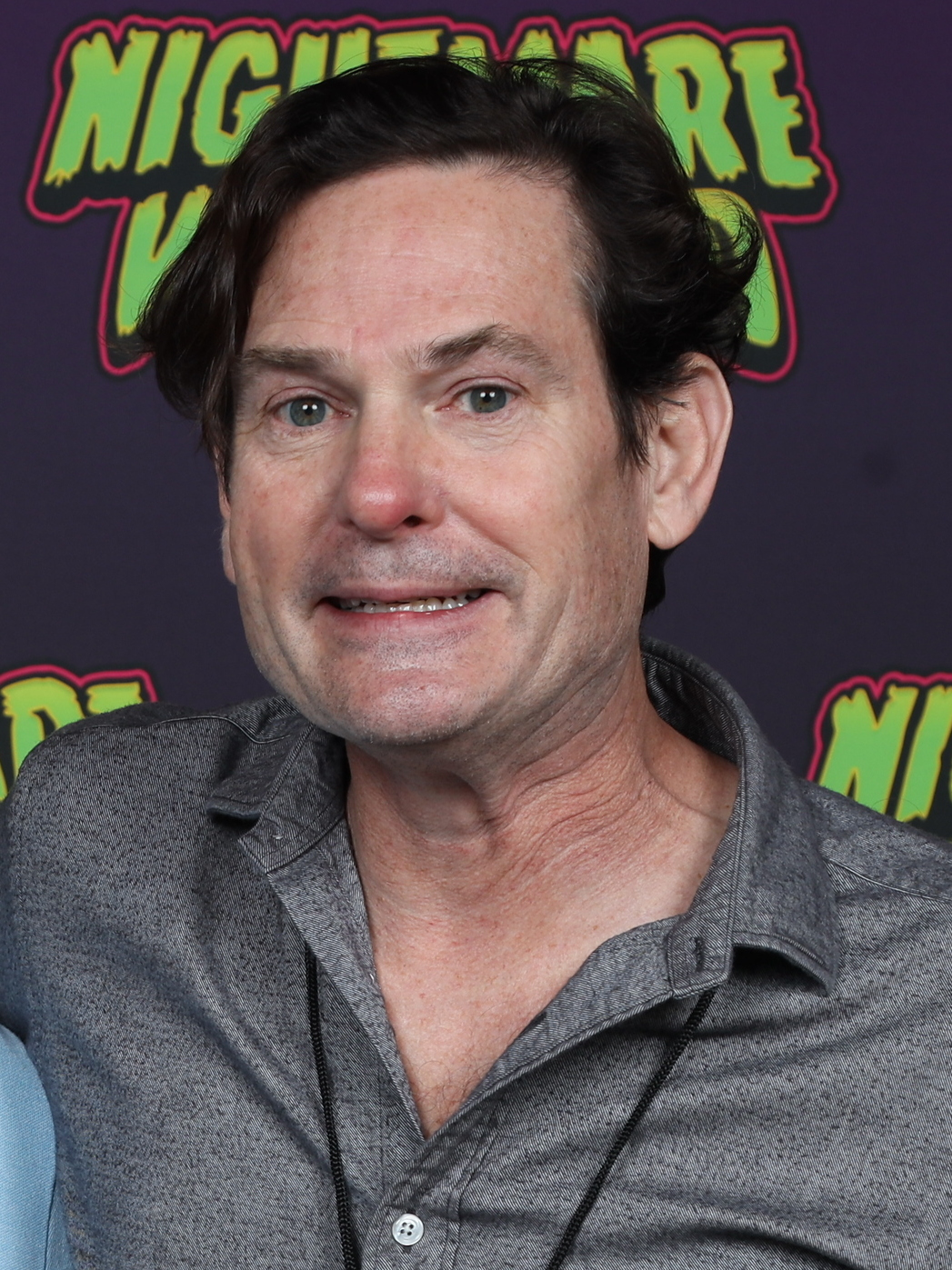
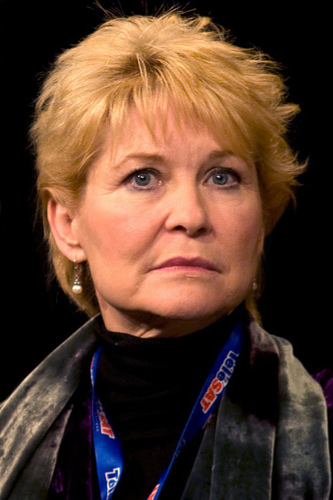
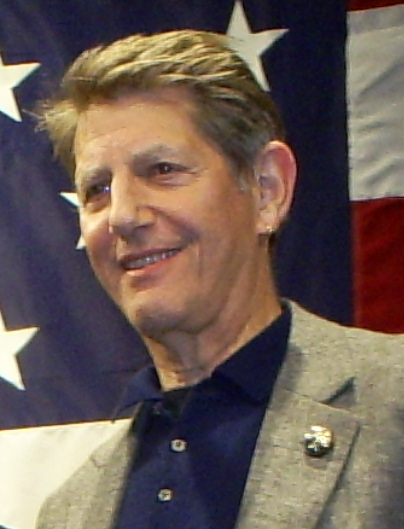
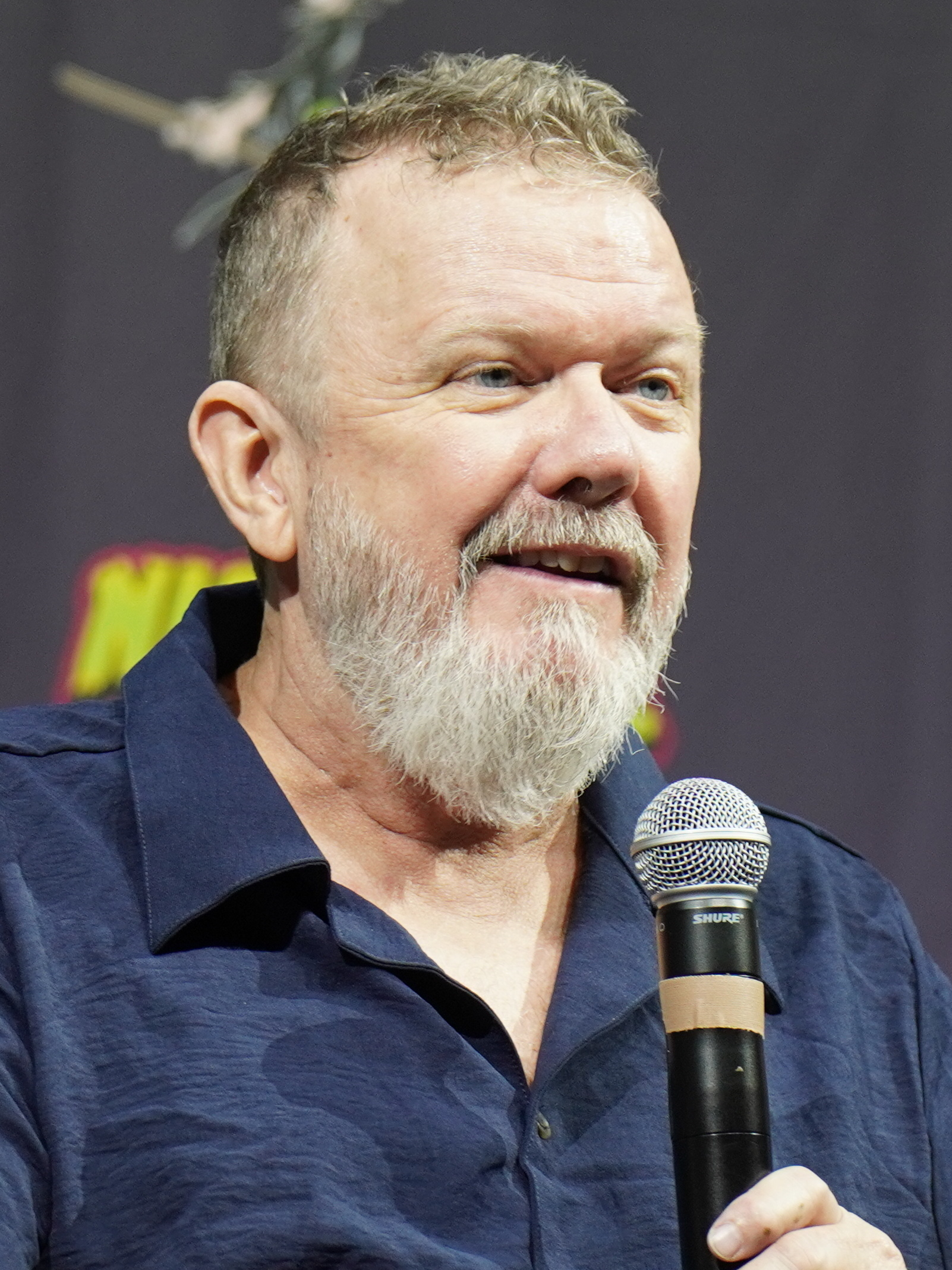
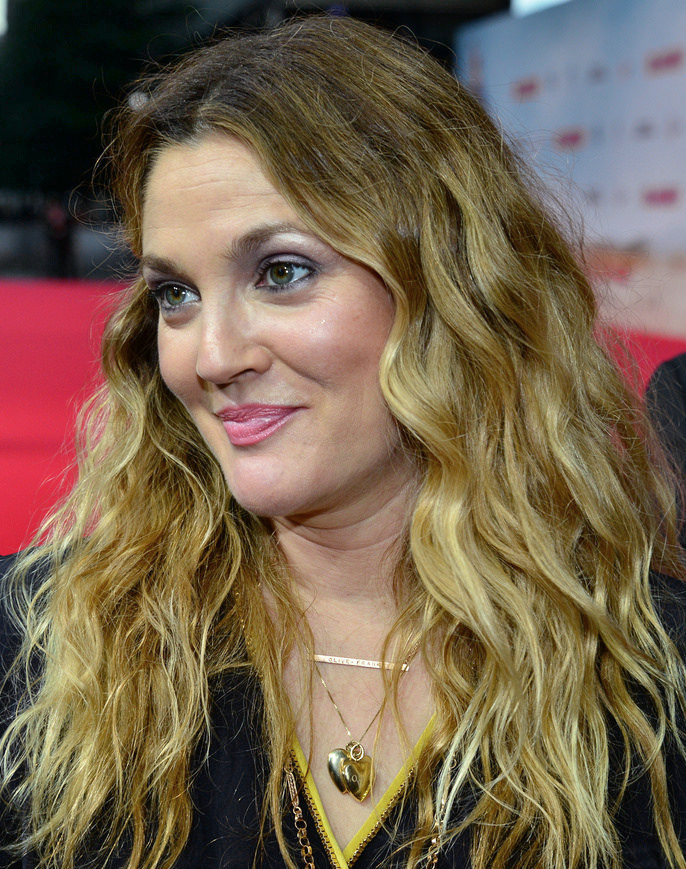
Henry Thomas (left), Dee Wallace, Peter Coyote, Robert MacNaughton, and Drew Barrymore respectively play the roles of Elliott, Mary, Keys, Michael, and Gertie.
- Henry Thomas as Elliott Taylor, a 10-year-old boy who befriends E.T.
- Dee Wallace as Mary Taylor, a single mother to Elliott, Michael, and Gertie
- Robert MacNaughton as Michael Taylor, Elliott and Gertie's older brother
- Drew Barrymore as Gertie Taylor, Elliott and Michael's younger sister
- Peter Coyote as Keys, a government agent bent on capturing E.T.
- K. C. Martel as Greg, a friend of Michael
- Sean Frye as Steve, a friend of Michael
- C. Thomas Howell as Tyler, a friend of Michael
- Erika Eleniak as a classmate whom Elliott kisses
- Pat Welsh as E.T. (voice, uncredited)

== Production ==
=== Development ===
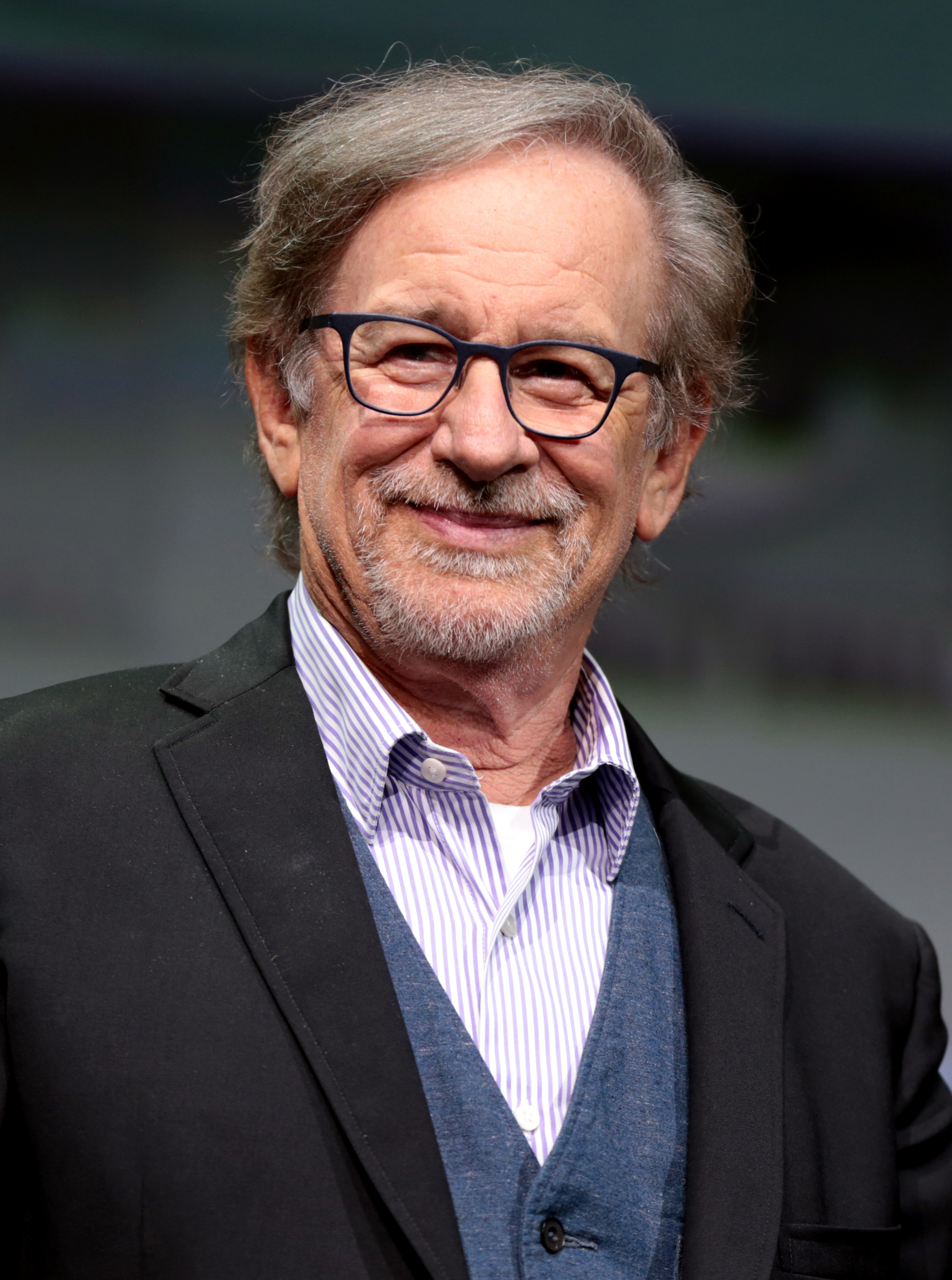
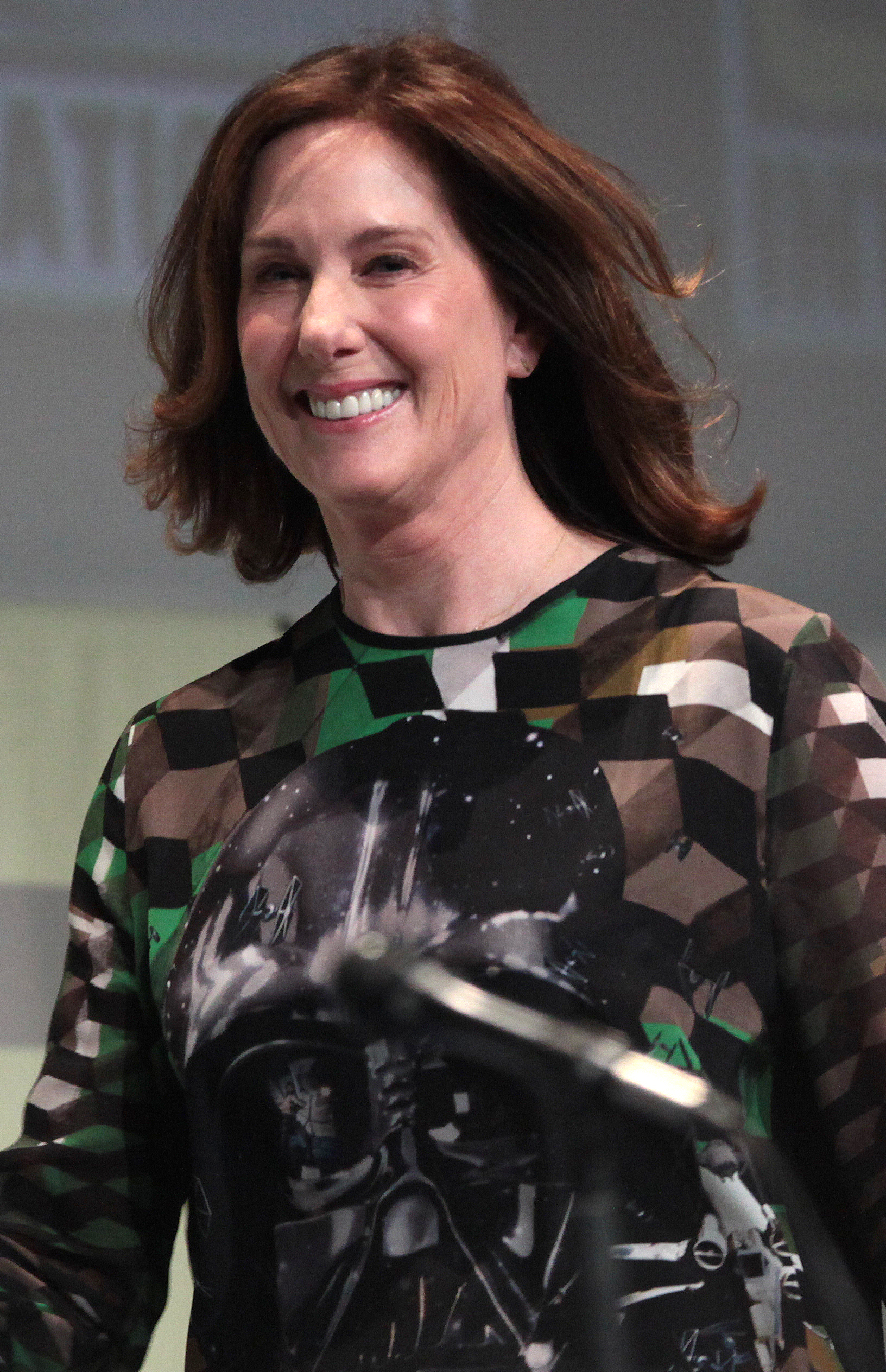
Director Steven Spielberg (left) and co-producer Kathleen Kennedy, the latter of whom received her first producing credit with this film

After his parents Arnold and Leah's divorce in 1960, Steven Spielberg filled the void with an imaginary alien companion that he later recalled as "a friend who could be the brother [he] never had and a father that [he] didn't feel [he] had anymore". In 1978, he announced that he would shoot a film entitled Growing Up, which he would film in four weeks. However, the project was set aside due to delays on 1941, but the concept of making a small autobiographical film about childhood would stay with him. He also thought about a follow-up to Close Encounters of the Third Kind, and began to develop a darker project he had planned with John Sayles called Night Skies, in which malevolent aliens terrorize a family.

Filming Raiders of the Lost Ark in Tunisia caused a sense of loneliness in Spielberg, far from his family and friends, and made memories of his childhood creation resurface. He told screenwriter Melissa Mathison about Night Skies, and developed a subplot from the failed project in which Buddy, the only friendly alien, befriends an autistic child. Buddy's abandonment on Earth in the script's final scene inspired the concept of E.T. Mathison wrote a first draft titled E.T. and Me in eight weeks, which Spielberg considered perfect. The script went through two more drafts, one by Matthew Robbins which deleted an "Eddie Haskell"–esque friend of Elliott's, named Lance. Robbins helped create the chase sequence and he suggested the scene where E.T. got drunk.

In mid-1981, while Raiders of the Lost Ark was being promoted, Columbia Pictures met with Spielberg to discuss the script, after having to develop Night Skies with the director as the intended sequel to Close Encounters of the Third Kind. However, Marvin Atonowsky, the head of Columbia Pictures' marketing and research development, concluded that it had limited commercial potential, believing that it would appeal to mostly young children. John Veitch, president of Columbia's worldwide productions, also felt that the script was not good or scary enough to be financially viable. On the advice of Atonowsky and Veitch, Columbia CEO Frank Price, who had already funneled nearly $1 million into the film's development (mostly on creature designer Rick Baker's alien models), was now calling it "a wimpy Walt Disney movie". He informed Spielberg that the project was officially being put into turnaround; Spielberg took the project to Sid Sheinberg, president of MCA, then the parent company of Universal Pictures. Spielberg told Sheinberg to acquire the E.T. script from Columbia Pictures, which he did for $1 million and struck a deal with Price in which Columbia would retain 5% of the film's net profits. Veitch later recalled that "I think [in 1982] we made more on that picture than we did on any of our films."

=== Pre-production ===
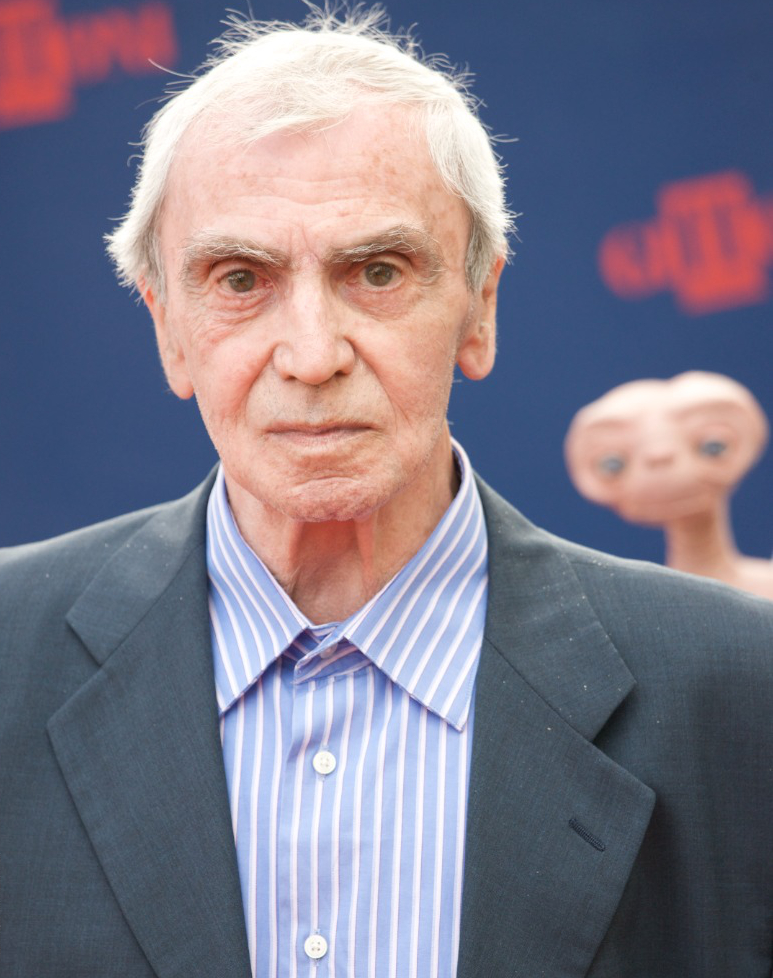
Italian special effects artist Carlo Rambaldi created E.T.'s design.

Carlo Rambaldi, who designed the aliens for Close Encounters of the Third Kind, was hired to design the animatronics for E.T. Rambaldi's own painting Women of Delta led him to give the creature a unique, extendable neck. Its face was inspired by those of Carl Sandburg, Albert Einstein and Ernest Hemingway. Producer Kathleen Kennedy visited the Jules Stein Eye Institute to study real and glass eyes. She hired Institute staffers to create E.T.'s eyes, which she felt were particularly important in engaging the audience. Four heads were created for filming, one as the main animatronic and the others for facial expressions, as well as a costume. A team of puppeteers controlled E.T.'s face with animatronics. Two little people, Tamara De Treaux and Pat Bilon, as well as 12-year-old Matthew DeMeritt, who was born without legs, took turns wearing the costume, depending on what scene was being filmed. DeMeritt actually walked on his hands and played all scenes where E.T. walked awkwardly or fell over. The head was placed above that of the actors, and the actors could see through slits in its chest. Caprice Roth, a professional mime, filled prosthetics to play E.T.'s hands. The puppet was created in three months at the cost of $1.5 million. Spielberg declared that it was "something that only a mother could love".

Mars, Incorporated refused to allow M&M's to be used in the film, believing that E.T. would frighten children. The Hershey Company was asked if Reese's Pieces could be used, and it agreed. This product placement resulted in a large increase in Reese's Pieces sales.

Science and technology educator Henry Feinberg created E.T.'s communicator device.

=== Casting ===
External videos
- Henry Thomas' 1981 audition tape that got him the part of Elliott via YouTube

Having worked with Cary Guffey on Close Encounters of the Third Kind, Spielberg felt confident in working with a cast composed mostly of child actors. For the role of Elliott, he auditioned hundreds of boys, including Keith Coogan; before Jack Fisk suggested Henry Thomas for the role because Henry had played the part of Harry in the film Raggedy Man, which Fisk had directed. Thomas, who auditioned in an Indiana Jones costume, did not perform well in the formal testing, but got the filmmakers' attention in an improvised scene. Thoughts of his dead dog inspired his convincing tears. Robert MacNaughton auditioned eight times to play Michael, sometimes with boys auditioning for Elliott. Spielberg felt that Drew Barrymore had the right imagination for the mischievous Gertie after she impressed him with a story that she led a punk rock band. He enjoyed working with the children, and he later said that the experience made him feel ready to be a father. Ralph Macchio was considered for the role of Tyler, before it went to his eventual The Outsiders co-star C. Thomas Howell.

The major voice work of E.T. for the film was performed by Pat Welsh. She smoked two packs of cigarettes a day, which gave her voice a quality that sound effects creator Ben Burtt liked. She spent nine-and-a-half hours recording her part, and was paid $380 by Burtt for her services. He also recorded 16 other people and various animals to create E.T.'s "voice". These included Spielberg, actress Debra Winger, his sleeping wife sick with a cold, a burp from his University of Southern California film professor, raccoons, otters, and horses.

Doctors working at the USC Medical Center were recruited to play the ones who try to save E.T. after government agents take over Elliott's house. Spielberg felt that actors in the roles, performing lines of technical medical dialogue, would come across as unnatural. During post-production, he decided to cut a scene featuring Harrison Ford as the principal at Elliott's school. It featured his character reprimanding Elliott for his behavior in biology class and warning of the dangers of underage drinking. He is then taken aback as Elliott's chair rises from the floor, while E.T. is levitating his "phone" equipment up the stairs with Gertie. Ford's face is never seen. The footage of this scene was included on the film's 1996 LaserDisc release as a bonus feature. It was not included on the DVD and Blu-ray releases that followed.

=== Filming ===
Principal photography began in neighborhoods in Los Angeles County and in the San Fernando Valley on September 8, 1981. The project was filmed under the cover name A Boy's Life, as Spielberg did not want anyone to discover and plagiarize the plot. The actors had to read the script behind closed doors, and everyone on set had to wear an ID card. The shoot began with two days at Culver City High School, and the crew spent the next 11 days moving between locations at Northridge and Tujunga. The next 42 days were spent at Laird International Studios in Culver City for the interiors of Elliott's home. The crew shot at a redwood forest near Crescent City in Northern California for the production's last six days. The exterior Halloween scene and the "flying bicycle" chase scenes were filmed in Porter Ranch.

Spielberg shot the film in roughly chronological order to achieve convincing emotional performances from his cast; it was also done to help the child actors with the workload. Spielberg calculated that the film would hit home harder if the children were really saying goodbye to E.T. at the end. In the scene in which Michael first encounters E.T., his appearance caused MacNaughton to jump back and knock down the shelves behind him. The chronological shoot gave the young actors an emotional experience as they bonded with E.T., making the quarantine sequences more moving. Spielberg ensured that the puppeteers were kept away from the set to maintain the illusion of a real alien. For the first time in his career, Spielberg did not storyboard most of the film, in order to facilitate spontaneity in the performances. The film was shot so adults, except for Dee Wallace, are never seen from the waist up in its first half, as a tribute to the cartoons of Tex Avery. According to Spielberg, the scene in which E.T. disguises himself as a stuffed toy in Elliott's closet was suggested by fellow director Robert Zemeckis after he read a draft of the screenplay that Spielberg had sent him. In between takes, the young actors spent time doing activities such as riding bicycles around the sound stages, playing Dungeons & Dragons, the game that Elliott, Michael, Steve, Tyler, and Greg play in a scene early in the film, and attending school lessons. The shoot was completed in 61 days, four ahead of schedule, although there were additional scenes filmed between January and February 1982.

In a 2022 interview, Sean Frye, who played Steve, revealed how the visual effect close-up shots for the climax of the "flying bicycle" chase scene were filmed and reflected on the experience, saying: "We were on these rigs ... They're pulling the trees backwards, past us on tracks, so it looks like we're going through and up and through and over to create this illusion that we're going forward when we're going nowhere. Then the pushing and pulling of the things so that the bike is up and down, and we can get the 'Whoaaaa' effects. That was great." BMX riders Robert Cardoza, Greg Maes, and David Lee served as stunt doubles for the scene.

== Soundtrack ==
The "Flying Theme"

Spielberg's regular collaborator John Williams described the challenge of creating a score that would generate sympathy for such an odd-looking creature. As with their previous collaborations, Spielberg liked every theme Williams composed and had it included. Spielberg loved the music for the final chase so much that he edited the sequence to suit it. Williams took a modernist approach, especially with his use of polytonality, which refers to the sound of two different keys played simultaneously. The Lydian mode can also be used in a polytonal way. Williams combined polytonality and the Lydian mode to express a mystic, dreamlike and heroic quality. His theme, emphasizing coloristic instruments such as the harp, piano, celesta, and other keyboards, as well as percussion, suggests E.T.'s childlike nature and his "machine". The soundtrack album was first released on June 11, 1982, the same day as the film. An audiobook companion album featuring Williams's score, produced by Quincy Jones and narrated by Michael Jackson, was released on November 15, 1982, exactly two weeks prior to Jackson's acclaimed sixth studio album Thriller.

== Themes ==
Spielberg admitted that this scene triggered speculation as to whether the film was a spiritual parable.

Spielberg drew the story of the film from his parents' divorce. Gary Arnold of The Washington Post called it "essentially a spiritual autobiography, a portrait of the filmmaker as a typical suburban kid set apart by an uncommonly fervent, mystical imagination". References to Spielberg's childhood occur throughout: Elliott fakes illness by holding a thermometer to the bulb in his lamp while covering his face with a heating pad, a trick frequently employed by the young Spielberg. Michael picking on Elliott echoes Spielberg's teasing of his younger sisters, and Michael's evolution from tormentor to protector reflects how Spielberg had to take care of his sisters after their father left.

Critics have focused on the parallels between the lives of E.T. and Elliott, who is "alienated" by the loss of his father. Pauline Kael noted that "Elliot (his name begins with an 'E' and ends with a 'T') is a dutiful, too sober boy who never takes off his invisible thinking cap; the telepathic communication he develops with E.T. eases his cautious, locked-up worries, and he begins to act on his impulses." A. O. Scott of The New York Times wrote that while E.T. "is the more obvious and desperate foundling", Elliott "suffers in his own way from the want of a home". At the film's heart is the theme of growing up. Some critics have suggested that Spielberg's portrayal of suburbia is very dark, contrary to popular belief. According to A. O. Scott, "the suburban milieu, with its unsupervised children and unhappy parents, its broken toys and brand-name junk food, could have come out of a Raymond Carver story." Charles Taylor of Salon wrote that "Spielberg's movies, despite the way they're often characterized, are not Hollywood idealizations of families and the suburbs. The homes here bear what the cultural critic Karal Ann Marling called 'the marks of hard use'." Relatedly, scholarship has emerged on the film regarding its subversion of the nuclear family dynamic, in which Elliott is growing up with a physically absent father and an emotionally absent mother; this aspect of the movie offers an exploration of upbringing within a nontraditional family structure.

Other critics found religious parallels between E.T. and Jesus. Andrew Nigels described E.T.'s story as "crucifixion by military science" and "resurrection by love and faith". According to Spielberg biographer Joseph McBride, Universal Pictures appealed directly to the Christian market, with a poster reminiscent of Michelangelo's The Creation of Adam (more specifically the "fingers touching" detail) and a logo reading "Peace". Spielberg answered that he did not intend the film to be a religious parable, joking, "If I ever went to my mother and said, 'Mom, I've made this movie that's a Christian parable,' what do you think she'd say? She has a Kosher restaurant on Pico and Doheny in Los Angeles."

Several writers have seen the movie as a modern fairy tale. Critic Henry Sheehan described the film as a retelling of Peter Pan from the perspective of a Lost Boy (Elliott): E.T. cannot survive physically on Earth, as Pan could not survive emotionally in Neverland; government scientists take the place of Neverland's pirates. Furthering the parallels, there is a scene in the film where Mary reads Peter Pan to Gertie. Vincent Canby of The New York Times similarly observed that the film "freely recycles elements from" Peter Pan and The Wizard of Oz. Kael writes that "from the opening in the dense, vernal woodland that adjoins Elliot's suburb (it's where we first hear E.T.'s frightened sounds), the film has the soft, mysterious inexorability of the classic tale of enchantment. The little shed in the back of the house where Elliott tosses in a ball and E.T. sends it back is part of a dreamscape."

Producer Kathleen Kennedy noted that an important theme of the film is tolerance, which would be central to future Spielberg films such as Schindler's List. Having been a loner as a teenager, Spielberg described it as "a minority story". Spielberg's characteristic theme of communication is partnered with the ideal of mutual understanding; he has suggested that the story's central alien-human friendship is an analogy for how real-world adversaries can learn to overcome their differences.

== Reception ==
=== Release and sales ===
E.T. was previewed in Houston, Texas, and premiered at the 1982 Cannes Film Festival's closing gala on May 26, 1982, and was released in the United States on June 11, 1982. It opened at number one at the US box office with a gross of $11 million, and stayed at the top of the box office for six weeks; it then fluctuated between the first and second positions until October, before returning to the top spot for the final time in December following a Christmas re-release. In its second weekend, it recorded the highest-grossing second weekend of all time, surpassing the record of $10,765,687 set by Superman II in 1981. In its fourth weekend, it recorded the highest-grossing weekend of all time, surpassing the record of $16,706,592 set earlier that year by Rocky III. It had a record eight weekends with a gross of over $10 million, a feat not matched until Home Alone (1990), and set a record for being at number one for 16 weeks in total, a record it still maintains to this day.

The film began its international rollout in Australia on November 26, 1982, and grossed $839,992 in its first 10 days from nine theatres, setting five weekly house records and 43 daily records. In South Africa, it opened in late November and grossed $724,340 in eight days from 14 screens, setting 13 weekly highs. In France, it opened on December 1, and had 930,000 admissions in its first five days on 250 screens, setting an all-time record in Paris for most daily admissions (Saturday, December 4). In Japan, it opened on December 4, and grossed $1,757,527 in two days from 35 theatres in 11 cities, setting 10 house records on Saturday and 14 on Sunday. In the United Kingdom, it opened on December 9 after a charity performance in London and grossed a record £1 million in its opening weekend. The film added another 138 screens in Japan on December 11, with advance sales of 1.3 million tickets. It later opened in the Philippines in January 1983. In Finland, Norway, and Sweden, the film had minimum age ratings of 8, 12, and 11, respectively, while Denmark had no minimum age limit. There were Swedish people who were opposed to the age limit.

In 1983, E.T. surpassed Star Wars to become the highest-grossing film of all time; by the end of its theatrical run, it had grossed $359 million in the United States and Canada and $619 million worldwide. Box Office Mojo estimates that the film sold over 120 million tickets in its initial U.S. theatrical run. Spielberg earned $500,000 a day from his share of the profits, while The Hershey Company's profits rose 65% due to the film's prominent placement of Reese's Pieces. The "Official E.T. Fan Club" offered photographs, a newsletter that let readers "relive the film's unforgettable moments [and] favorite scenes", and a vinyl record with "phone home" and other sound clips.

The film was also a merchandising success, with dolls selling 15 million units by September 1982 and becoming the best-selling toy that Christmas season. E.T. went on to generate over $1 billion in merchandise sales by 1998. Following the success of the film, Kuwahara, the company that created the BMX bikes featured in the film, began producing red and white "E.T." models in three price and quality levels. Kuwahara reissued the E.T. model in 2002, as part of the film's 20th anniversary, and again in 2022 as part of the film's 40th anniversary.

Posters of the 1985, 2002 and 2022 re-releases

The film was re-released in 1985 and 2002, earning another $60 million and $68 million respectively, for a worldwide total of $792 million with $435 million from the United States and Canada. It held the global record until it was surpassed by Jurassic Park, another Spielberg film, in 1993, although it managed to hold on to the United States and Canada record for a further four years, until the release of the Special Edition of Star Wars.

It was re-released in IMAX on August 12, 2022, in the United States and Canada, to commemorate the film's 40th anniversary, alongside an IMAX and RealD 3D reissue of another Spielberg film Jaws scheduled for September 2. Jim Orr, Universal's president of distribution remarked "No filmmaker, it's fair to say, has had a greater or more enduring impact on American cinema or has created more indelible cinematic memories for tens of billions of people worldwide. We couldn't think of a more perfect way to celebrate the anniversary of E.T. and the first Universal-Spielberg summer blockbuster, Jaws, than to allow audiences to experience these films in a way they've never been able to before." The IMAX release grossed $490,000 on its first day from 389 theaters, for a three-day total of $1.07 million and a $438 million running total.

The film would remain one of Universal's top three highest-grossing films of all time in North America, behind Jurassic World (2015) and The Super Mario Bros. Movie (2023), until 2024 with the release of Wicked, the first installment of the musical's two-part film adaptation. As of 2025, the film remains the studio's fifteenth highest-grossing film of all time worldwide.

=== Home media ===
E.T. was eventually released on VHS and LaserDisc on October 27, 1988. The videos were priced with a recommended retail price of $24.95, the lowest initial price at the time for a major movie compared to the normal price of $89.95. To combat piracy, the tape guards and tape hubs on the videocassettes were colored green, and the tape itself was affixed with a small, holographic sticker of the 1963 Universal logo (much like the holograms on a credit card), and encoded with Macrovision. The film doubled the record pre-orders of Cinderella released the same month and went on to sell over 15 million VHS units in the United States, and grossed over $250 million in video sales revenue. The VHS cassette was also rented over six million times during its first two weeks in 1988, a record it held until the VHS release of Batman the following year. Conservative Christians who were still angry about Universal's release of The Last Temptation of Christ earlier in the year called for a boycott of this release. Initial orders internationally exceeded $30 million despite the film often being sold at full price, setting records in the United Kingdom with over 81,000 units and Australia with 35,500 units. It initially shipped 152,000 units in Japan and 87,000 in Germany. In 1991, Sears began selling E.T. videocassettes exclusively at their stores as part of a holiday promotion. It was reissued on VHS and LaserDisc again in 1996, with the latter including a 90-minute documentary produced and directed by Laurent Bouzereau; it included interviews with Spielberg, producer Kathleen Kennedy, composer John Williams, and other cast and crew members, as well as two theatrical trailers, an isolated music score, deleted scenes, and still galleries. The VHS included a 10-minute version of the same documentary from the LaserDisc. Both 1996 home video releases of the film were also THX certified as well. The 2012 release of E.T. on DVD and Blu-ray grossed $24.4 million in sales revenue as of 2017 in the United States.

=== Critical response ===
Empire magazine called Elliott and E.T.'s flight to the forest "the most magical moment in cinema history". The scene is a tribute to the 1951 Vittorio De Sica film Miracle in Milan, one of Spielberg's favorite films.

Upon release, E.T. the Extra-Terrestrial was universally praised by film critics. Roger Ebert gave the film four out of four stars and wrote, "It works as science fiction, it's sometimes as scary as a monster movie, and at the end, when the lights go up, there's not a dry eye in the house." He later added it to his canon of "Great Movies", structuring the essay as a letter to his grandchildren about watching it with them. Of the scene with the flying bicycles, he writes: "I remember when I saw the movie at Cannes: Even the audience there, people who had seen thousands of movies, let out a whoop at that moment."

Pauline Kael for The New Yorker wrote "Spielberg respects the conventions of children's stories, and because he does he's able to create the atmosphere for a mythic experience" going on to say "Spielberg has earned the tears that some people in the audience, and not just children, shed."

Michael Sragow of Rolling Stone called Spielberg "a space age Jean Renoir. ... for the first time, [he] has put his breathtaking technical skills at the service of his deepest feelings". Derek Malcolm of The Guardian wrote that "E.T. is a superlative piece of popular cinema [...] a dream of childhood, brilliantly orchestrated to involve not only children but anyone able to remember being one". Leonard Maltin included it in his list of "100 Must-See Films of the 20th Century" as one of only two movies from the 1980s. Political commentator George Will was one of few to pan the film, feeling it spread subversive notions about childhood and science.

John Nubbin reviewed E.T. for Different Worlds magazine and stated that "E.T. is a totally enjoyable film. The detail lavished on the movie makes it an exquisite viewing experience well above the crowd of the summer releases."

The film holds a 99% approval rating on Rotten Tomatoes, based on 147 reviews, and an average rating of 9.2/10. The website's critical consensus reads: "Playing as both an exciting sci-fi adventure and a remarkable portrait of childhood, Steven Spielberg's touching tale of a homesick alien remains a piece of movie magic for young and old." On Metacritic, which uses a weighted average, it has a score of 92 out of 100 based on 30 reviews. indicating "universal acclaim". In addition to the film's wide acclaim, President Ronald Reagan and First Lady Nancy Reagan were moved by it after a screening at the White House on June 27, 1982. Diana, Princess of Wales was in tears after watching it. On September 17, 1982, it was screened at the United Nations, and Spielberg received a UN Peace Medal. CinemaScore reported that audiences polled during the opening weekend gave the film a rare "A+" grade, the first film to earn that grade.

== Accolades ==
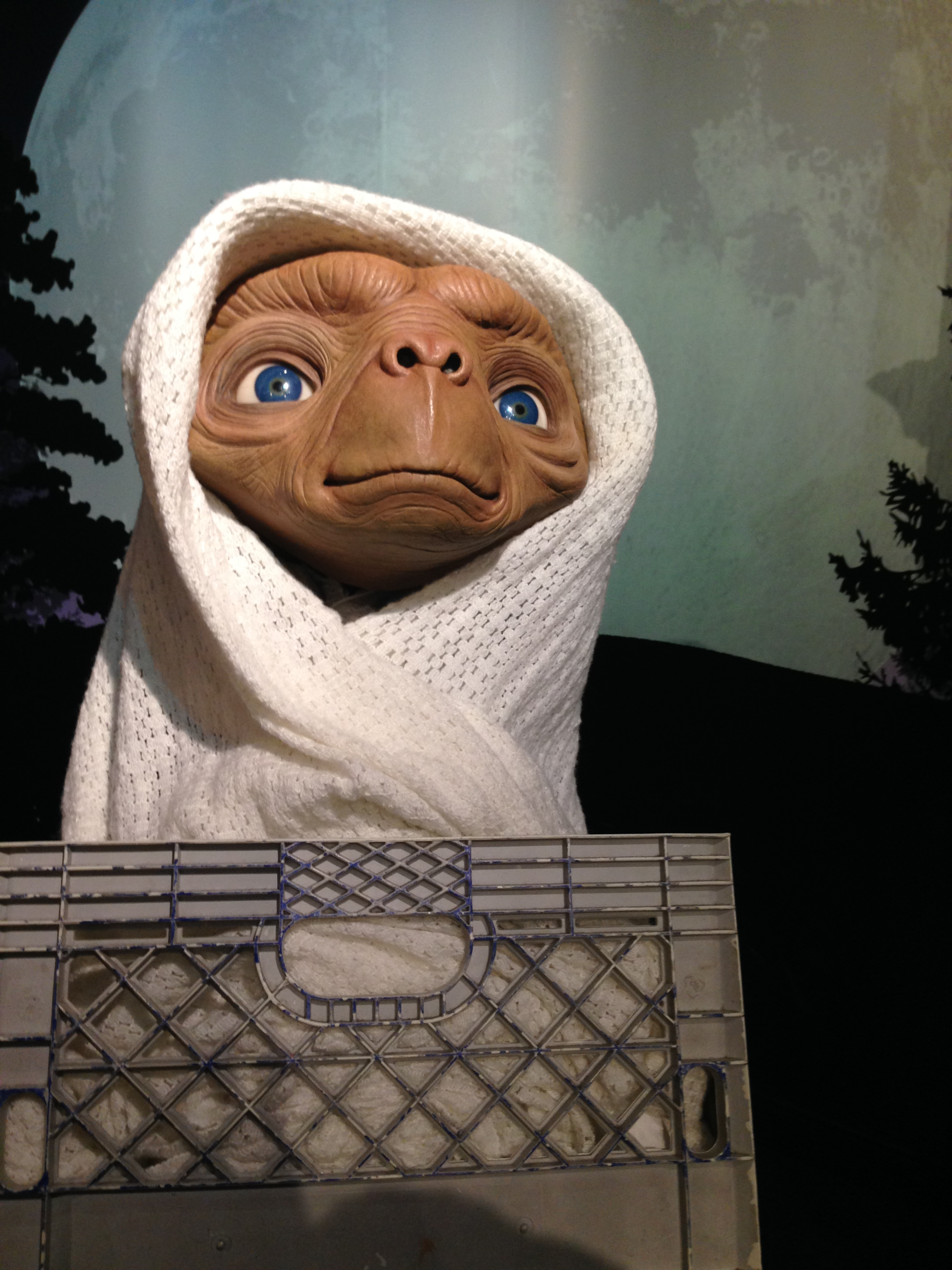
Waxwork of E.T. at Madame Tussauds, London

The film was nominated for nine Oscars at the 55th Academy Awards, including Best Picture. Gandhi won that award, but its director, Richard Attenborough, said, "I was certain that not only would E.T. win, but that it should win. It was inventive, powerful, wonderful. I make more mundane movies." E.T. won four Academy Awards: Best Original Score, Best Sound (Robert Knudson, Robert Glass, Don Digirolamo, and Gene Cantamessa), Best Sound Effects Editing (Charles L. Campbell and Ben Burtt), and Best Visual Effects (Carlo Rambaldi, Dennis Muren, and Kenneth F. Smith).

At the 40th Golden Globe Awards, the film won Best Picture in the Drama category and Best Original Score; it was also nominated for Best Director, Best Screenplay, and Best New Male Star for Henry Thomas. The Los Angeles Film Critics Association awarded the film Best Picture, Best Director, and a "New Generation Award" for Melissa Mathison. The film won Saturn Awards for Best Science Fiction Film, Best Writing, Best Special Effects, Best Music, and Best Poster Art, while Henry Thomas, Robert McNaughton, and Drew Barrymore won Young Artist Awards. In addition to his Academy, Golden Globe and Saturn, composer John Williams won two Grammy Awards and a BAFTA for the score. The film's audiobook album also won the Grammy Award for Best Recording for Children at the 26th Annual Grammy Awards in 1984. (Note: In order to be eligible for a Grammy Award at the 1984 ceremony, nominated records had to be released between October 1, 1982, and September 30, 1983.)

== Legacy ==
In American Film Institute polls, the film has been voted the 24th greatest film of all time, the 44th most heart-pounding, and the sixth most inspiring. Other AFI polls rated it as having the 14th greatest music score and as the third greatest science-fiction one. The line "E.T. phone home" was ranked 15th on AFI's 100 Years...100 Movie Quotes list, and 48th on Premiere's top movie quote list. In 2005, it topped a Channel 4 poll in the UK of the 100 greatest family films, and was listed by Time as one of the 100 best movies ever made. The February 2020 issue of New York Magazine lists E.T. as among "The Best Movies That Lost Best Picture at the Oscars."

In 2003, Entertainment Weekly called the film the eighth most "tear-jerking"; in 2007, in a survey of both films and television series, the magazine declared it the seventh greatest work of science-fiction media in the past 25 years. In 2006, Writers Guild of America West ranked its screenplay 67th in WGA's list of 101 Greatest Screenplays. The Times also named it as their ninth favorite alien in a film, calling it "one of the best-loved non-humans in popular culture". It is among the top ten in the BFI list of the 50 films you should see by the age of 14. In 1994, it was selected for preservation in the U.S. National Film Registry as being "culturally, historically, or aesthetically significant". In 2011, ABC aired Best in Film: The Greatest Movies of Our Time, revealing the results of a poll of fans conducted by ABC and People magazine: It was selected as the fifth best film of all time and the second best science fiction film. On October 22, 2012, Madame Tussauds unveiled wax likenesses of E.T. at six of its international locations.

A species of sponge, Advhena magnifica, was given the common name "E.T. sponge" due to its resemblance of the creature.

In 2023, actress Rita Moreno, who starred in Spielberg's 2021 film adaptation of the musical West Side Story, named E.T. as one of her top five favorite films, saying "Number one, it has superb child actors, which can really only happen because of Steven Spielberg. He is just great with children because he's like a child himself. It's a very interesting phenomenon."

Elements of the film, particularly the story, iconography and musical score, would go on to influence or be referenced in other media, including the films Back to the Future (1985), Stand by Me (1986), Super 8 (2011), Arrival (2016), Nope (2022) and Elio (2025), as well as the Netflix series Stranger Things (2016–2025).

== Controversies ==
=== The Alien ===
Following the film's release, Indian filmmaker Satyajit Ray claimed that E.T. drew from his unproduced 1967 science-fiction screenplay, The Alien. Mimeographed copies of Ray's script had circulated in Hollywood after a failed production deal with Columbia Pictures. In 1982, science fiction author Arthur C. Clarke contacted Ray to note similarities between the works, including an alien with healing powers who befriends a young boy. In a 1983 interview, Ray stated that E.T. would not have been possible if his script was not available in the United States. Spielberg denied the allegation, stating he was a high school student when Ray's script circulated. However, press reports noted this timeline was inaccurate, as Spielberg was approximately 21 years old in 1967 and was already directing television by 1969. Ray declined to file a copyright lawsuit after being advised by Clarke. He concluded that the story had been modified enough to prevent legal action, adding that he was not vindictive and respected Spielberg as a director.

=== 20th anniversary version controversy ===
The 20th anniversary version of the film replaces the guns used by the federal agents with walkie-talkies.

An extended version of the film, dubbed the "Special Edition" (currently out of circulation), including altered dialogue and visual effects, premiered at the Shrine Auditorium in Los Angeles on March 16, 2002; it was released in theatres nationwide six days later. Certain shots of E.T. had bothered Spielberg since 1982, as he did not have enough time to perfect the animatronics. Computer-generated imagery (CGI), provided by Industrial Light & Magic (ILM), was used to modify several shots, including ones of E.T. running in the opening sequence and being spotted in the cornfield. The spaceship's design was also altered to include more lights. The first flying sequence where Elliott and E.T. fly on their bicycle through the forest now had the cape of Elliott's Halloween costume flap in the wind as it appeared to have originally been intended to be, a change done to have the sequence, particularly the iconic shot of them flying past the Moon, match the film's poster and the logo of Spielberg's production company Amblin Entertainment.

Scenes shot for but not included in the original version were introduced. These included E.T. taking a bath and Gertie telling Mary that Elliott went to the forest on Halloween. Mary's dialogue, during the offscreen argument with Michael about his Halloween costume, was altered to replace the word "terrorist" with "hippie" in response to the September 11 terrorist attacks. Spielberg did not add the scene featuring Harrison Ford, feeling that would reshape the film too drastically. He became more sensitive about the scene where gun-wielding federal agents confront Elliott and his escaping friends and had them digitally replaced with walkie-talkies. Spielberg later admitted that he regretted editing out the guns from the film, stating that the film should be left untouched to represent the culture of its time.

At the premiere, John Williams conducted a live performance of the score. The new release grossed $68 million in total, with $35 million coming from Canada and the United States. The changes to it, particularly the escape scene, were criticized as political correctness. Peter Travers of Rolling Stone wondered "Remember those guns the feds carried? Thanks to the miracle of digital, they're now brandishing walkie-talkies. ... Is this what two decades have done to free speech?" Chris Hewitt of Empire wrote, "The changes are surprisingly low-key ... while ILM's CGI E.T. is used sparingly as a complement to Carlo Rambaldi's extraordinary puppet." South Park ridiculed many of the changes in the 2002 episode "Free Hat".

The two-disc DVD release which followed on October 22, 2002, contained the original theatrical and 20th Anniversary extended versions of the film. The features on disc one included deleted scenes, an introduction with Spielberg, a "Reunion" featurette and a "Look Back" featurette. Disc two included a 24-minute documentary about the 20th Anniversary edition changes, a 20th Anniversary premiere featurette, John Williams' performance at the 2002 premiere, a Space Exploration game, a trailer, cast and filmmaker bios, production notes, and the still galleries ported from the 1996 LaserDisc set. The two-disc edition, as well as a three-disc collector's edition containing a "making of" book, a certificate of authenticity, a film cell, and special features that were unavailable on the two-disc edition, were placed in moratorium on December 31, 2002. Later, it was re-released on DVD as a single-disc re-issue in 2005, featuring only the 20th Anniversary version.

In a June 2011, interview, Spielberg said,

[In the future,] ... There's going to be no more digital enhancements or digital additions to anything based on any film I direct. ... When people ask me which E.T. they should look at, I always tell them to look at the original 1982 E.T. If you notice, when we did put out E.T. we put out two E.T.s. We put out the digitally enhanced version with the additional scenes and for no extra money, in the same package, we put out the original '82 version. I always tell people to go back to the '82 version.

For the film's 30th anniversary release on Blu-ray in 2012 and for its 35th anniversary release on Ultra HD Blu-ray in 2017, as well as its corresponding digital releases, only the original theatrical edition was released, with the 20th anniversary edition now out of circulation.

== Other portrayals ==
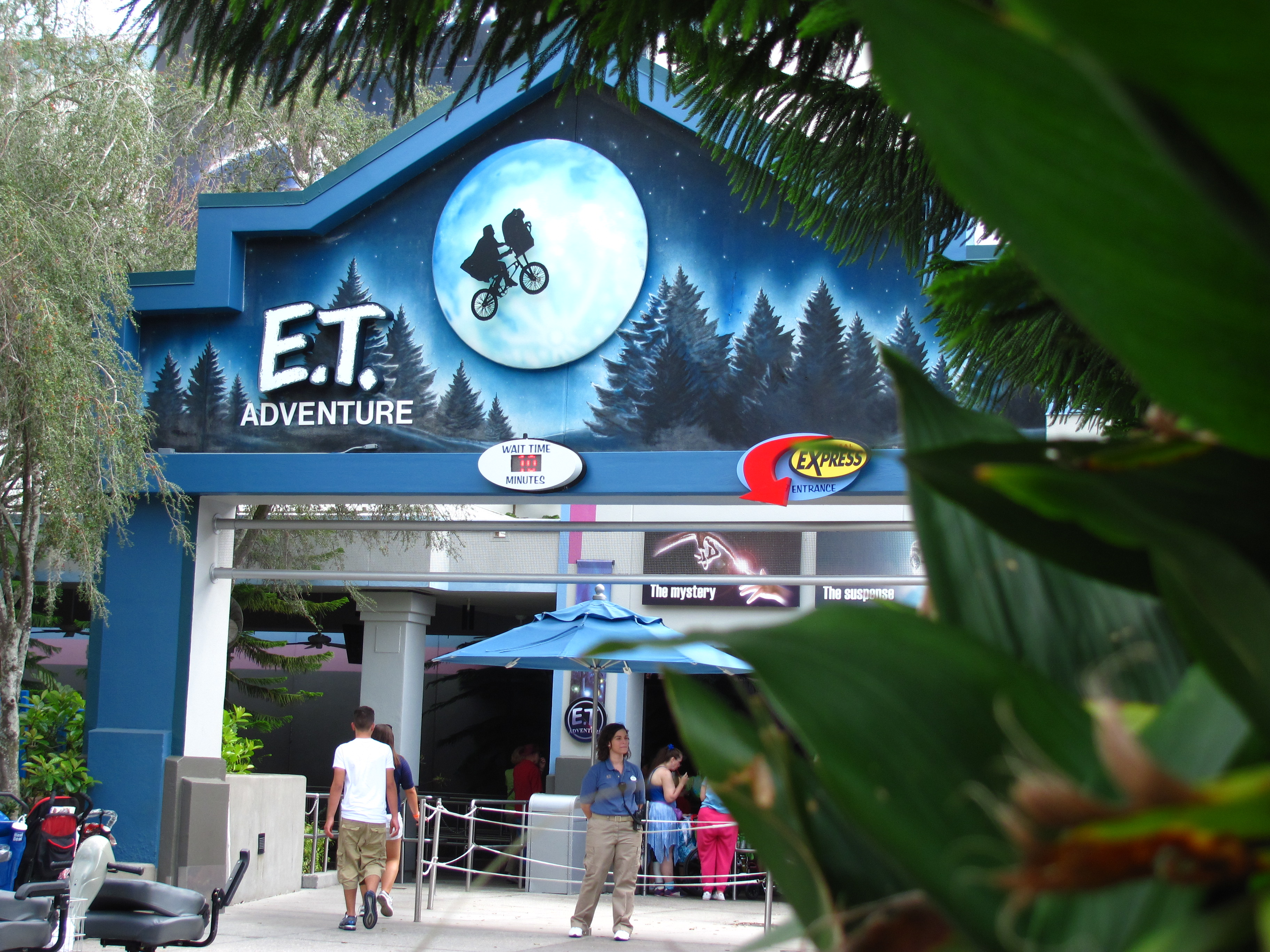
The outside facade of E.T. Adventure at Universal Studios Florida

Atari, Inc. produced a video game based on the film for the Atari 2600 and hired Howard Scott Warshaw to program the game. The game was rushed in five weeks to release within the 1982 Christmas season. Released in Christmas 1982, the game was critically panned, with nearly every aspect of the game facing heavy criticism. It has since been considered to be one of the worst video games ever made. It was also a commercial failure. It has been cited as a major contributing factor to the video game industry crash of 1983, and has been frequently referenced and mocked in popular culture as a cautionary tale about the dangers of rushed game development and studio interference. In what was initially deemed an urban legend, reports from 1983 stated that as a result of overproduction and returns, millions of unsold cartridges were secretly buried in an Alamogordo, New Mexico landfill and covered with a layer of concrete. In April 2014, diggers hired to investigate the claim confirmed that the Alamogordo landfill contained many E.T. cartridges, among other games.

William Kotzwinkle, author of the film's novelization, wrote a sequel, E.T.: The Book of the Green Planet, which was published in 1985. In the novel, E.T. returns home to the planet Brodo Asogi, but is subsequently demoted and sent into exile. He attempts to return to Earth by effectively breaking all of Brodo Asogi's laws.

E.T. Adventure, a theme park ride based on the film and drawing inspiration from The Book of the Green Planet, debuted at Universal Studios Florida on June 7, 1990. The $40 million attraction features the title character saying goodbye to visitors by name, along with his home planet. In 1998, E.T. was licensed to appear in television public service announcements produced by the Progressive Corporation. The announcements featured his voice reminding drivers to "buckle up" their seat belts. Traffic signs depicting a stylized E.T. wearing one were installed on selected roads around the United States. The following year, British Telecommunications launched the "Stay in Touch" campaign, with him as the star of various advertisements. The campaign's slogan was "B.T. has E.T.", with "E.T." also taken to mean "extra technology".

At Spielberg's suggestion, George Lucas included members of E.T.'s species as background characters in Star Wars: Episode I – The Phantom Menace. E.T. was one of the franchises featured in the video game Lego Dimensions. E.T. appears as one of the playable characters and a world based on the film where players can receive side quests from the characters is available. During E.T.'s trailer in the sketch for the series known as Meet that Hero!, Supergirl explains his backstory and how they have many things in common, including that both are aliens who crashed on Earth and how they both have superpowers that they use to help other people. In 2017, video game developer Zen Studios released a pinball adaptation as part of the Universal Classics add-on pack for the virtual pinball game Pinball FX 3. It features 3D animated figures of Elliot, E.T. and his spacecraft.

== Sequels ==
=== Cancelled sequel ===
In July 1982, during the film's first theatrical run, Spielberg and Mathison wrote a treatment for a sequel to be titled E.T. II: Nocturnal Fears, which would have shown Elliott and his friends getting kidnapped by evil aliens, and attempting to contact E.T. for help. Spielberg decided against pursuing it, feeling it "would do nothing but rob the original of its virginity. E.T. is not about going back to the planet". Spielberg also revealed in a January 2025 interview with Indiewire that he briefly considered adapting E.T.: The Book of the Green Planet into a film. He ultimately decided against it, believing that "it was better as a novel than I think it would have been as a film." In 2022, Henry Thomas said that he hopes a feature-length sequel never gets made, but added "I guarantee you, there are a few men in a very big room now salivating and using their abacus and slide rules to come up with some really, really big numbers."

=== Short film sequel ===
Poster for A Holiday Reunion

On November 28, 2019, during NBC's broadcast of the 93rd Macy's Thanksgiving Day Parade, Xfinity released a four-minute commercial directed by Lance Acord, calling it a "short film sequel" to the original film, titled A Holiday Reunion. The commercial stars Henry Thomas, reprising his role as Elliott, now an adult with a family of his own. Julianne Hoyak played his wife, Grace, while Zebastin Borjeau and Alivia Drews played their children, Elliott Jr. and Maggie. The story follows E.T. as he returns to Earth for the Christmas season, and focuses on the importance of bringing family together. References and nods to the original film are featured, such as a photo of the Taylors' family dog Harvey on the kitchen fridge and a replica of the makeshift Speak & Spell communication device.

The commercial uses a practical puppet for E.T. himself. In an interview with Deadline, Acord said that he went this route in order to elicit more realistic performances from the actors, the same way Spielberg did on the original film. John Williams' score from the original film is mixed into the commercial. Spielberg was consulted by Comcast (parent company of NBCUniversal, which itself owns Universal Pictures) before production on the commercial began.

Peter Intermaggio, SVP for Marketing Communications for Comcast, remarked on the making of the commercial: "Our goal is to show how Xfinity and Sky technology connects family, friends and loved ones, which is so important during the holidays ... The classic friendship between E.T. and Elliott resonates around the world." Before the commercial was released, Thomas assured that viewers would "get everything they want out of a sequel without the messy bits that could destroy the beauty of the original and the special place it has in people's minds and hearts ... Looking at the storyboards, I could see exactly why Steven was really behind it, because the integrity of the story isn't lost in this retelling."

The full commercial also played on Syfy and theatrically during cinema pre-shows through January 5, 2020, and a two–minute version was edited for Comcast's British subsidiary, Sky UK.

== See also ==
- List of films set around Halloween
- The Cat from Outer Space (1978)
- Flight of the Navigator (1986)
- Mac and Me (1988)

== Bibliography ==
- Brode, Douglas (1995). "E.T. the Extra-Terrestrial". The Films of Steven Spielberg. Citadel. pp. 114–127. ISBN 0806515406.
- Kotzwinkle, William (1985). E.T.: The Book of the Green Planet. Berkley Books. ISBN 0425076423.
- McBride, Joseph (1997). Steven Spielberg: A Biography. Faber and Faber. ISBN 0571191770.
- Rubin, Susan Goldman (2001). Steven Spielberg. Harry N. Abrams. ISBN 0810944928.
- Shay, Don; Duncan, Jody (1993). The Making of Jurassic Park: An Adventure 65 Million Years in the Making. Boxtree. ISBN 1852837748.
- Worsley, Sue Dwiggins (1997). From Oz to E.T.: Wally Worsley's Half-Century in Hollywood. Scarecrow Press. ISBN 0810832771.
