= Pat Bilon =

American actor (1947–1983)

- Born: Michael Patrick Bilon; August 29, 1947; Youngstown, Ohio, U.S.
- Died: January 27, 1983 (aged 35); Youngstown, Ohio, U.S.
- Resting place: Calvary Cemetery
- Education: Youngstown State University
- Occupation: Actor
- Height: 2 ft 10 in (86 cm)

Michael Patrick Bilon (August 29, 1947 – January 27, 1983) was an American actor best known for his performances in Under the Rainbow and E.T. the Extra-Terrestrial. At no taller than 2 ft 10 in (86 cm), he was considered one of the smallest adult dwarfs in the US, but never characterized himself as disabled. Through much of his adult life, he was an active member of Little People of America, and was its District 5 director in his final years.

== Early years ==
Bilon was born in the mid-sized industrial town of Youngstown, Ohio, to Michael and Esther Bilon.

He attended Ursuline High School in Youngstown, and graduated from Youngstown State University's school of speech and drama.

== Career ==
Although he appeared in various television commercials and was hired for promotional events, Bilon described himself as a "starving actor".

When not acting, he held several jobs, including a bouncer at a bowling alley and a basketball coach for elementary school students. He worked as a radio dispatcher for the Mahoning County Sheriff's Department in Youngstown. He occasionally assisted in undercover operations, facilitated by his diminutive stature.

In 1979, while attending a Little People of America convention, he was seen by producer Steve Rash and director Fred Bauer, who were seeking cast members for the slapstick comedy Under the Rainbow. Of over 400 auditionees, Bilon was among 150 selected to appear in the film. He took a leave of absence from his dispatching job and went to Hollywood to "begin his new role", where he was able to perform with prominent actors including Chevy Chase, Carrie Fisher and Eve Arden. He later said in a newspaper interview, "When a star like Chevy Chase sees you after a scene and says it was hilarious, as you watch him practically falling out of his seat, it makes you feel real good".

Bilon's next film opportunity came in 1981, when he was selected to operate one of the mechanical "creatures" in the filming of E.T. the Extra-Terrestrial. Four mechanical E.T.s were created for the production. The puppets, constructed of fiberglass, polyurethane and foam rubber, were designed for different functions. A newspaper article reported: "One of the 'bodies' contained mechanical controls for large body movements and was operated by cables, the second had electronic controls and the third was operated by a combination of controls". Bilon operated a fourth E.T. that was needed for scenes where the creature "lurched" across the floor. For five months, Bilon performed in the 40 lb (20 kg) costume that weighed nearly as much as he did.

Fred Skidmore, a spokesman for Universal Studios, confirmed that Bilon played the alien in E.T. the Extra-Terrestrial through most of the film. "Pat did do the majority of the movie", he said. "He was also E.T. when E.T. appeared at the Hollywood Bowl last summer". Steven Spielberg, producer-director of the film, called Bilon "E.T.'s biggest helper".

== Personal life and death ==
Bilon was passionate about his ethnic heritage; he once hosted a Ukrainian Radio Hour on WKTL-FM, based in Struthers, Ohio, part of the Youngstown area. He was active in St. Anne's Ukrainian Catholic Church in nearby Austintown, Ohio, where he taught Sunday school. He was also a member of UNA Branch 119.

Bilon died in his home at 1 a.m. on January 27, 1983, aged 35, of complications from a blood infection after a bout of pneumonia.
