= Melissa Mathison =

American screenwriter (1950–2015)

- Mathison in 2015
- Born: Melissa Marie Mathison; June 3, 1950; Los Angeles, California, U.S.
- Died: November 4, 2015 (aged 65); Los Angeles, California, U.S.
- Education: University of California, Berkeley
- Occupation: Screenwriter
- Years active: 1979–2015
- Spouse: Harrison Ford (m. 1983; div. 2004)
- Children: 2

Melissa Marie Mathison (June 3, 1950 – November 4, 2015) was an American film and television screenwriter and an activist for the Tibetan independence movement. She wrote the screenplays for the films The Black Stallion (1979) and E.T. the Extra-Terrestrial (1982), the latter of which earned her the Saturn Award for Best Writing and a nomination for the Academy Award for Best Original Screenplay.

Mathison later wrote The Indian in the Cupboard (1995), based on Lynne Reid Banks's 1980 children's novel of the same name, and Kundun (1997), a biographical-drama film about the Dalai Lama. Her final film credit was The BFG (2016), which marked her third collaboration with film director Steven Spielberg.

== Early years ==
Melissa Marie Mathison was born on June 3, 1950, in Los Angeles, one of five siblings. Her father, Richard Randolph Mathison, was the Los Angeles bureau chief of Newsweek. Her mother was Margaret Jean (née Kieffer) Mathison, a food writer and convenience-foods entrepreneur. After graduating from Providence High School in 1968, Mathison attended the University of California, Berkeley. Her family was friendly with Francis Ford Coppola, whose children were babysat by Mathison. Coppola offered her a job as his assistant on The Godfather Part II (1974), an opportunity for which she left her studies at UC Berkeley.

With Coppola's encouragement, she wrote a script for The Black Stallion, adapted from the novel, that caught Steven Spielberg's attention.

== Screenwriting and production credits ==
Mathison wrote the screenplay for E.T. the Extra-Terrestrial (1982) in collaboration with Steven Spielberg. It was nominated for an Oscar for Best Original Screenplay. The script was based on a story, written by John Sayles, that Spielberg provided to Mathison during the filming of Raiders of the Lost Ark (1981). Spielberg attributes the line "E.T. phone home" to Mathison. She collaborated again with Spielberg for The BFG (2016), her final film, which was dedicated in her memory. She also had film credits for The Escape Artist (1982) and The Indian in the Cupboard (1995).

== Dalai Lama ==
Mathison met the Dalai Lama in 1990 when she was writing the script for Kundun (1997) and developed a lasting friendship with him. She continued to work as an activist for Tibetan freedom and was on the board of the International Campaign for Tibet.

== Personal life and death ==
Mathison had a relationship with Francis Ford Coppola while working as his assistant on The Godfather Part II, an affair that lasted through the production of Apocalypse Now. From 1983 to 2004, she was married to Harrison Ford; the couple had two children. She died on November 4, 2015, in Los Angeles, aged 65, from neuroendocrine cancer.

== Screenwriting filmography ==
Year	Title	Genre	Notes
1979	The Black Stallion	Family-adventure	
1982	E.T. the Extra-Terrestrial	Fantasy-adventure-science fiction	Saturn Award for Best Writing; Nominated—Academy Award for Best Original Screenplay, (1983); The line "E.T. phone home." is ranked 15th among the top 100 quotations of U.S. cinema by the American Film Institute.
1982	The Escape Artist	Drama	
1983	Twilight Zone: The Movie	Science fiction-thriller	Segment 2, "Kick the Can"; credited as "Josh Rogan"
1991	Son of the Morning Star	Western	Television film
1995	The Indian in the Cupboard	Family-adventure	
1997	Kundun	Biographical-drama	
1998	The Emperor's New Clothes: An All-Star Illustrated Retelling of the Classic Fairy Tale	Animated, Family	
2008	Ponyo	Animated, family-adventure	Storyline consultant, English-language translation
2016	The BFG	Family-fantasy-adventure	Posthumous release Nominated—Saturn Award for Best Writing
