= Atari Mindlink =

Unreleased Atari video game controller

Mindlink
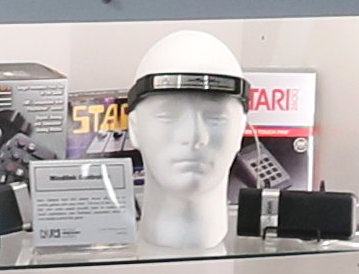
- A Mindlink controller at the National Videogame Museum
- Developer: Atari
- Type: Video game controller
- Connectivity: Controller port

The Atari Mindlink is an unreleased video game controller for the Atari 2600, originally intended for release in 1984. The Mindlink was unique in that its headband form factor controls the game by reading the myoneural signal voltage from the player's forehead. The player's forehead movements are read by infrared sensors and transferred as movement in the game.

Specially supported games are similar to those that use the paddle controller, but with the Mindlink controller instead. Three games were in development for the Mindlink by its cancellation: Bionic Breakthrough, Telepathy, and Mind Maze. Bionic Breakthrough is basically a Breakout clone, controlled with the Mindlink. Mind Maze uses the Mindlink for a mimicry of ESP, to pretend to predict what is printed on cards. Testing showed that players frequently got headaches due to moving their eyebrows to play the game. None of these games were ever released in any other form.
