= Atari 2600 hardware =

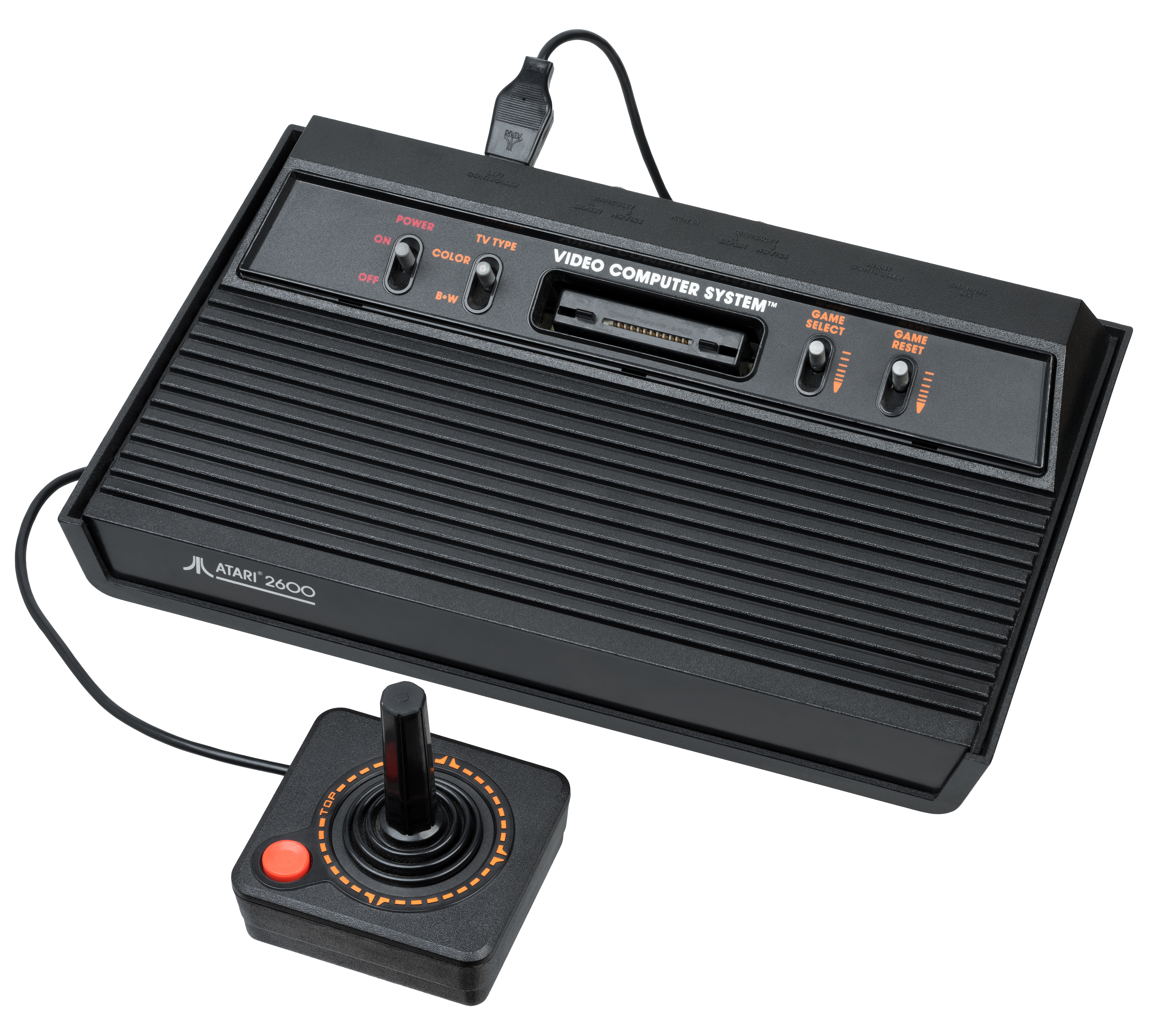
The Atari 2600 in "Darth Vader" design shown with a joystick

The Atari 2600 hardware was based on the MOS Technology 6507 chip, offering a maximum resolution of 160 × 192 pixels (NTSC), 128 colors, 128 bytes of RAM with 4 KB on cartridges (64 KB via bank switching). The design experienced many makeovers and revisions during its 14-year production history, from the original "heavy sixer" to the Atari 2600 Jr. at the end. The system also has many controllers and third-party peripherals.

== Technical specifications ==
- CPU: 1.19 MHz MOS Technology 6507
- Audio + Video processor: Television Interface Adaptor (TIA)
  - Playfield resolution: 40 × 192 pixels (NTSC). Uses a 20-pixel register that is mirrored or copied, left side to right side, to achieve the width of 40 pixels.
  - Player sprites: 8 × 192 pixels (NTSC). Player, ball, and missile sprites use pixels that are 1/4 the width of playfield pixels (unless stretched).
  - Ball and missile sprites: 1 × 192 pixels (NTSC).
  - Maximum resolution: 160 × 192 pixels (NTSC). Max resolution is only somewhat achievable with programming tricks that combine sprite pixels with playfield pixels.
  - 128 colors (NTSC). 128 possible on screen. Max of 4 per line: background, playfield, player0 sprite, and player1 sprite. Palette switching between lines is common. Palette switching mid line is possible but not common due to resource limitations.
  - 2 channels of 1-bit monaural sound with 4-bit volume control.
- RAM (within a MOS Technology RIOT chip): 128 bytes (additional RAM may be included in the game cartridges)
- ROM (game cartridges): 4 KB maximum capacity (64 KB with bank switching)
- Input (controlled by MOS RIOT):
  - Two screw-less DE-9 (Note: The screwless DE-9 controller ports subsequently became the mechanical and electrical de facto standard for game controllers in the 8-bit and early 16-bit era and were used in most subsequent Atari and Commodore consoles and home computers, among many others including the Sega Genesis.) controller ports, for single-button joysticks, paddles, trackballs, driving controllers, 12-key keyboard controllers (0–9, #, and *), and third party controllers with additional functions
  - Six switches (original version): Power on/off, TV signal (B/W or Color), Difficulty for each player (called A and B), Select, and Reset. Except for the power switch, games could (and did) assign other meanings to the switches. On later models, the difficulty switches were miniaturized and moved to the back of the unit.
- Output: B/W or color TV picture and sound signal through RF modulator (NTSC, PAL, or SECAM, depending on region; game cartridges are exchangeable between NTSC and PAL/SECAM machines, but this will result in wrong or missing colors and often a rolling picture.)

== Controllers ==
The Atari 2600 has many input devices such as joysticks, paddles, and keyboards, as well as third-party components. The console was originally packaged with two standard Atari CX10 joysticks, later upgraded to the more common CX40 model, and a set of paddles. Joysticks with a single button and eight-directional stick are the predominant input device for Atari 2600 games.

Atari-compatible joysticks are also used for the VIC-20, Commodore 64, Commodore 128, Amiga, Atari 8-bit, Atari ST, Amstrad CPC, MSX and several Japanese home computers; they could be used with fairly common adapters on Plus/4, Commodore 16, ZX81, and ZX Spectrum. Sega video game consoles such as the Master System and Genesis can also use Atari-compatible joysticks for games that only require one button.

Late European versions of the 2600 Jr. included the CX-78 joypad instead of CX40 joystick, the same controller used in the European Atari 7800.

The other main controller, the Atari CX30-04 paddle, is used for games based on one-dimensional movement. These included Pong, Breakout, and Circus Atari, among others.

The Atari CX20-01 "driving controller" appears similar in design to the paddle, but there is only one per DE-9 port rather than two paddles per port. The key difference in function between the paddle and driving controller is that the paddle's wheel had a finite amount it would turn before hitting a stop, while the driving controller's wheel could rotate continuously. This is essential for overhead-view driving games, for which the player would turn the wheel a total of 360 degrees in one direction on every lap. The driving controller is used for games such as Indy 500.

The Atari CX50 keyboard controller functions as a computer keyboard and is required for games such as Concentration.

The Atari Mindlink is a prototyped motion controller which measures the movement of the user's eyebrows via a fitted headband, which replaces the paddle controller; however, the Mindlink was cancelled early in its development.

Atari controllers

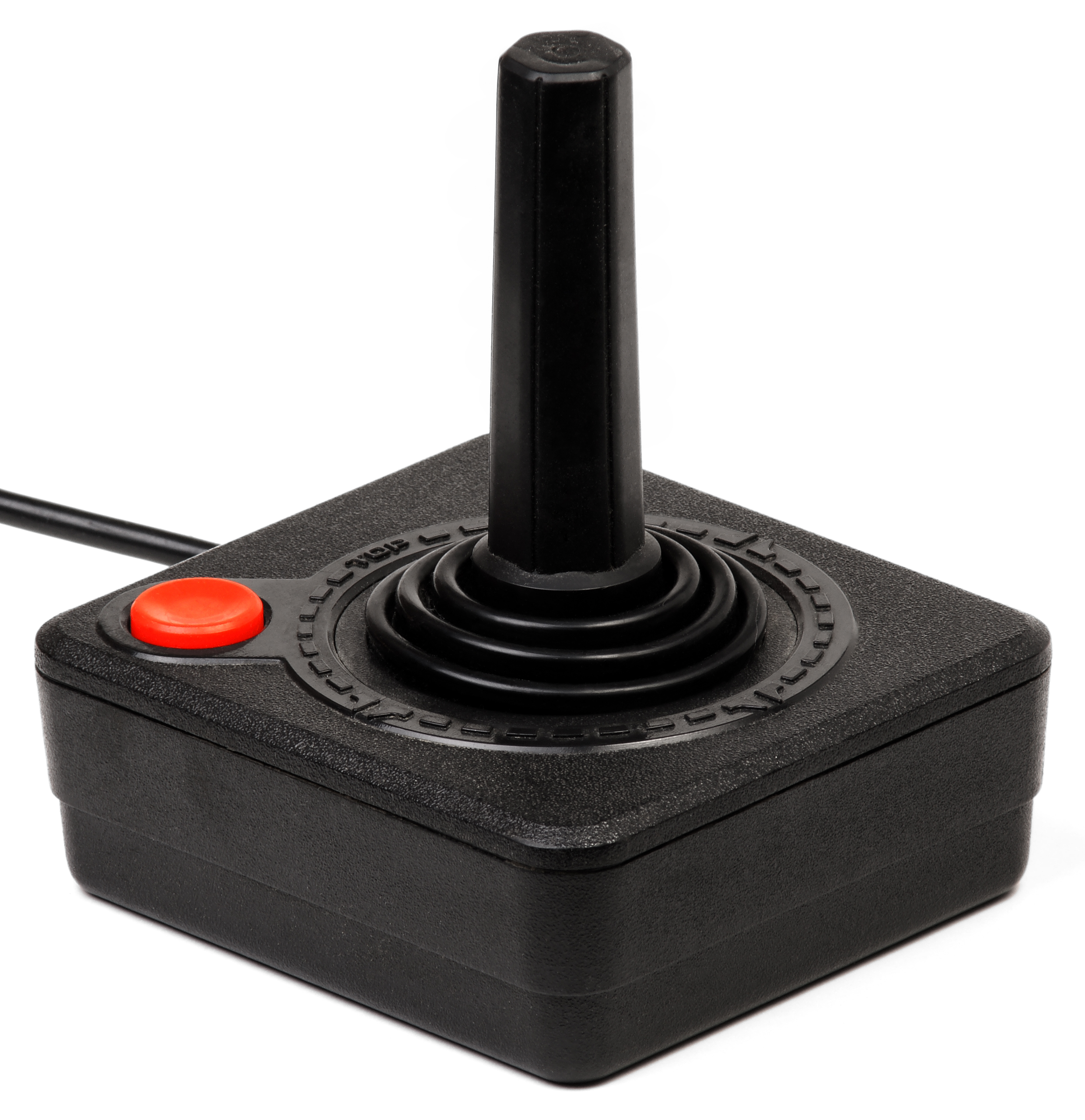
Standard CX40 joystick

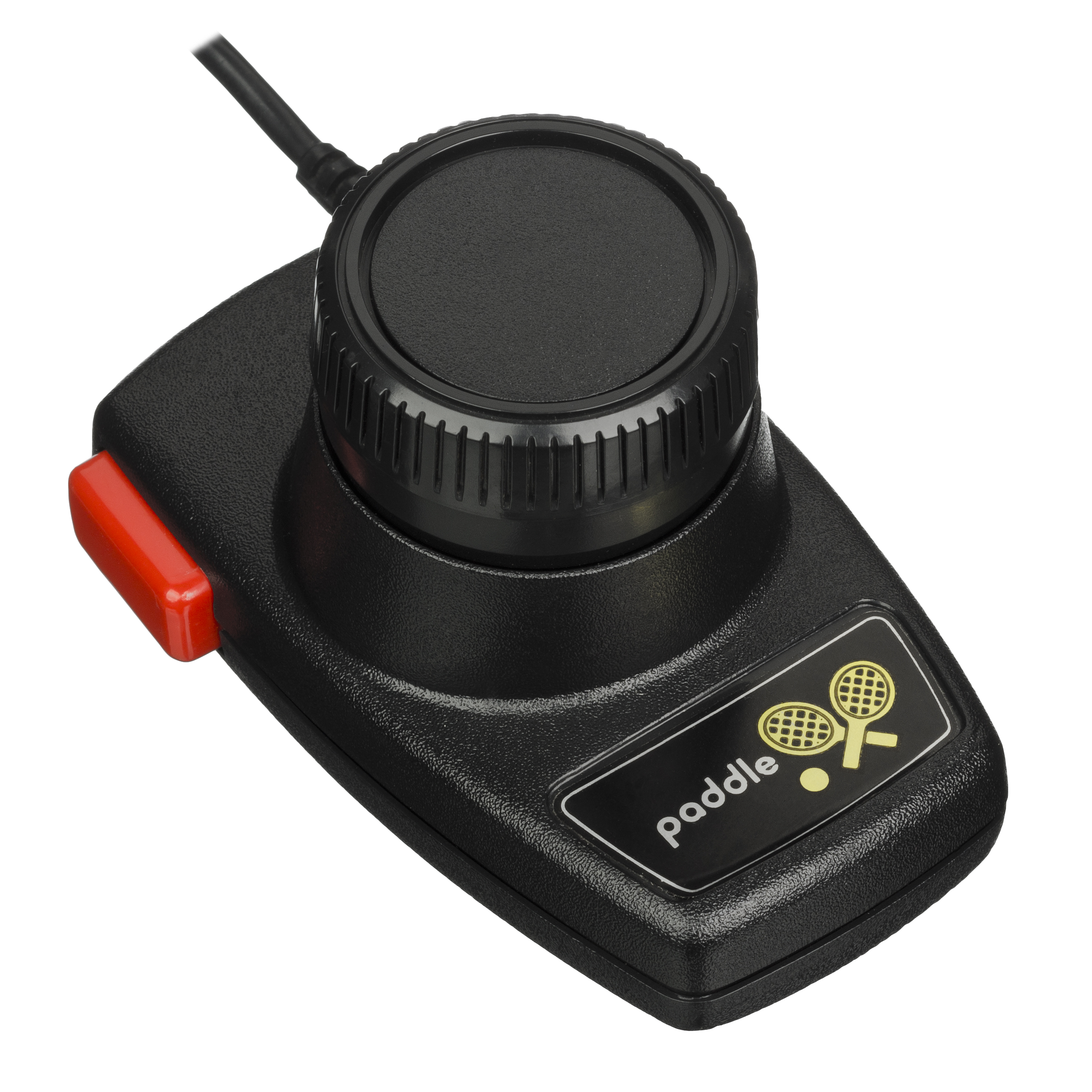
CX30-04 paddle controller

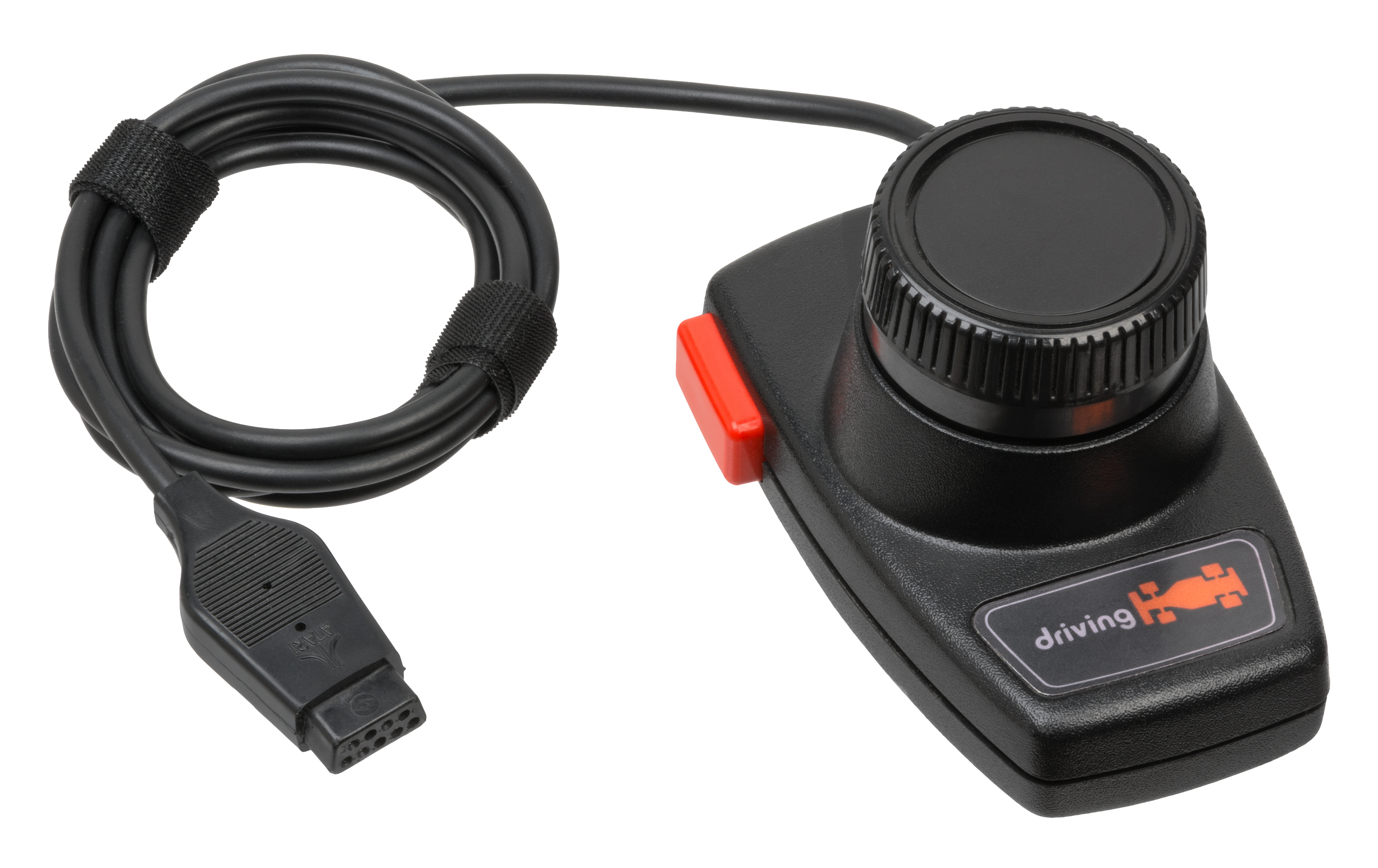
CX20-01 driving controller

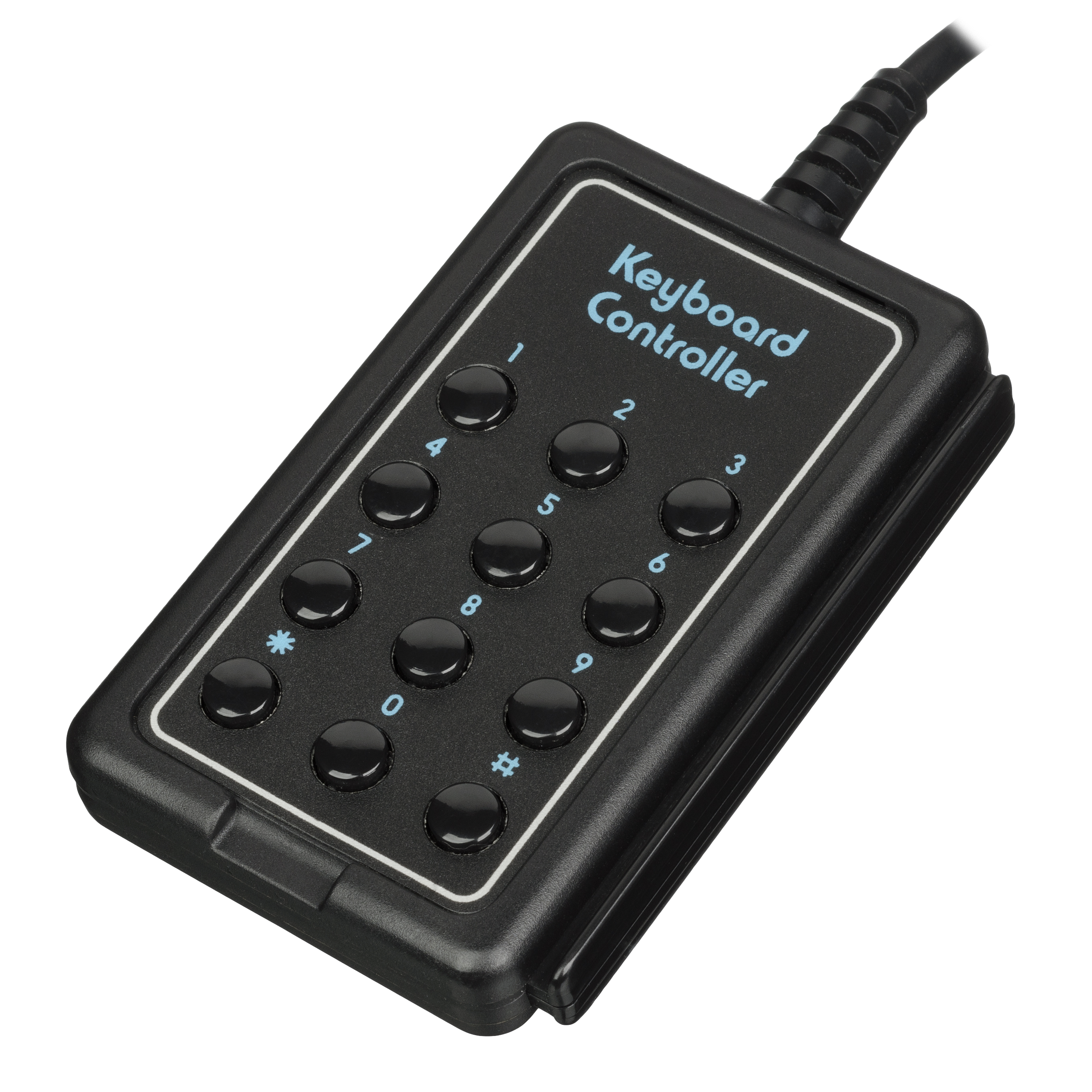
CX50 Keyboard Controller

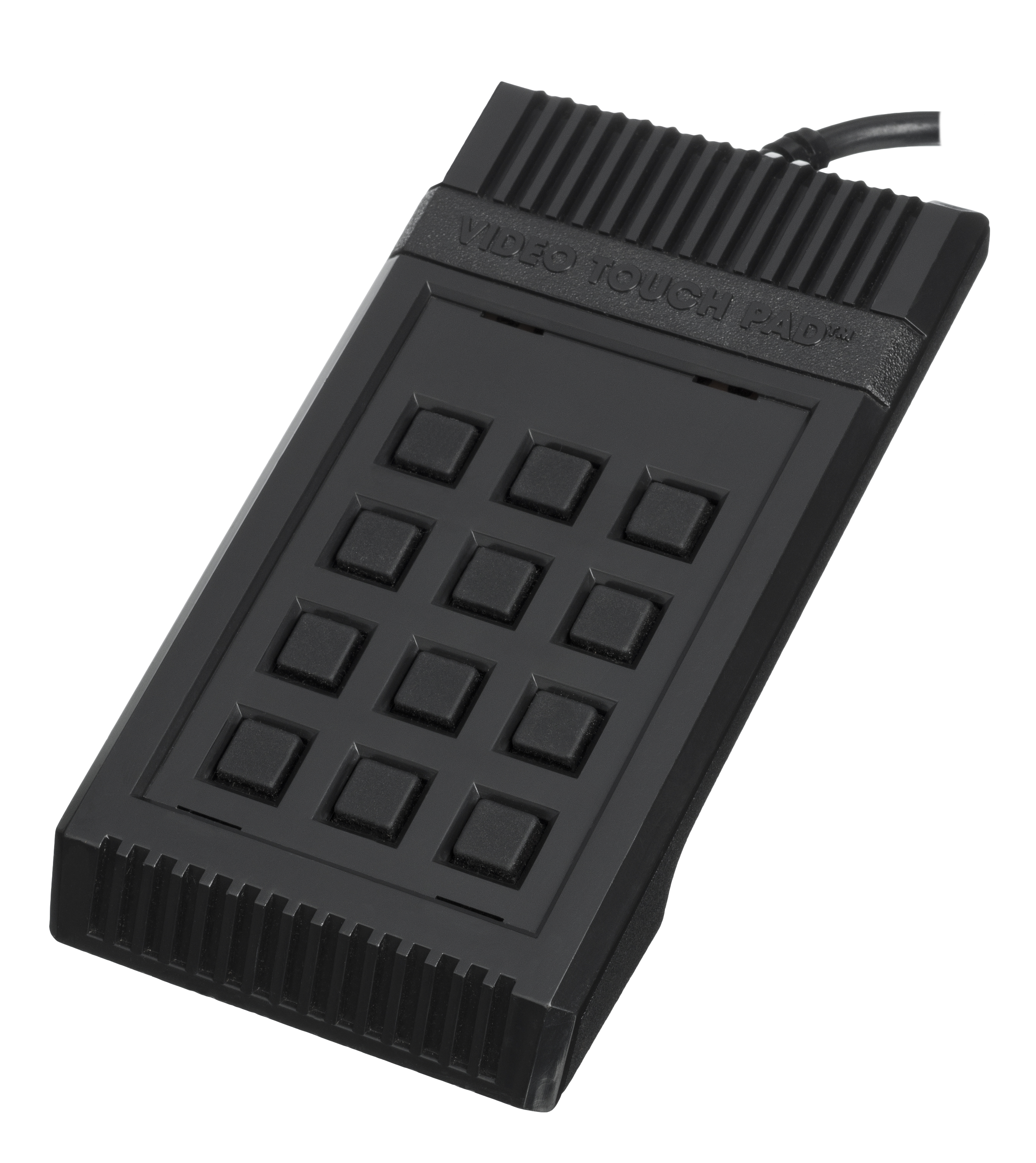
CX21 Video Touch Pad

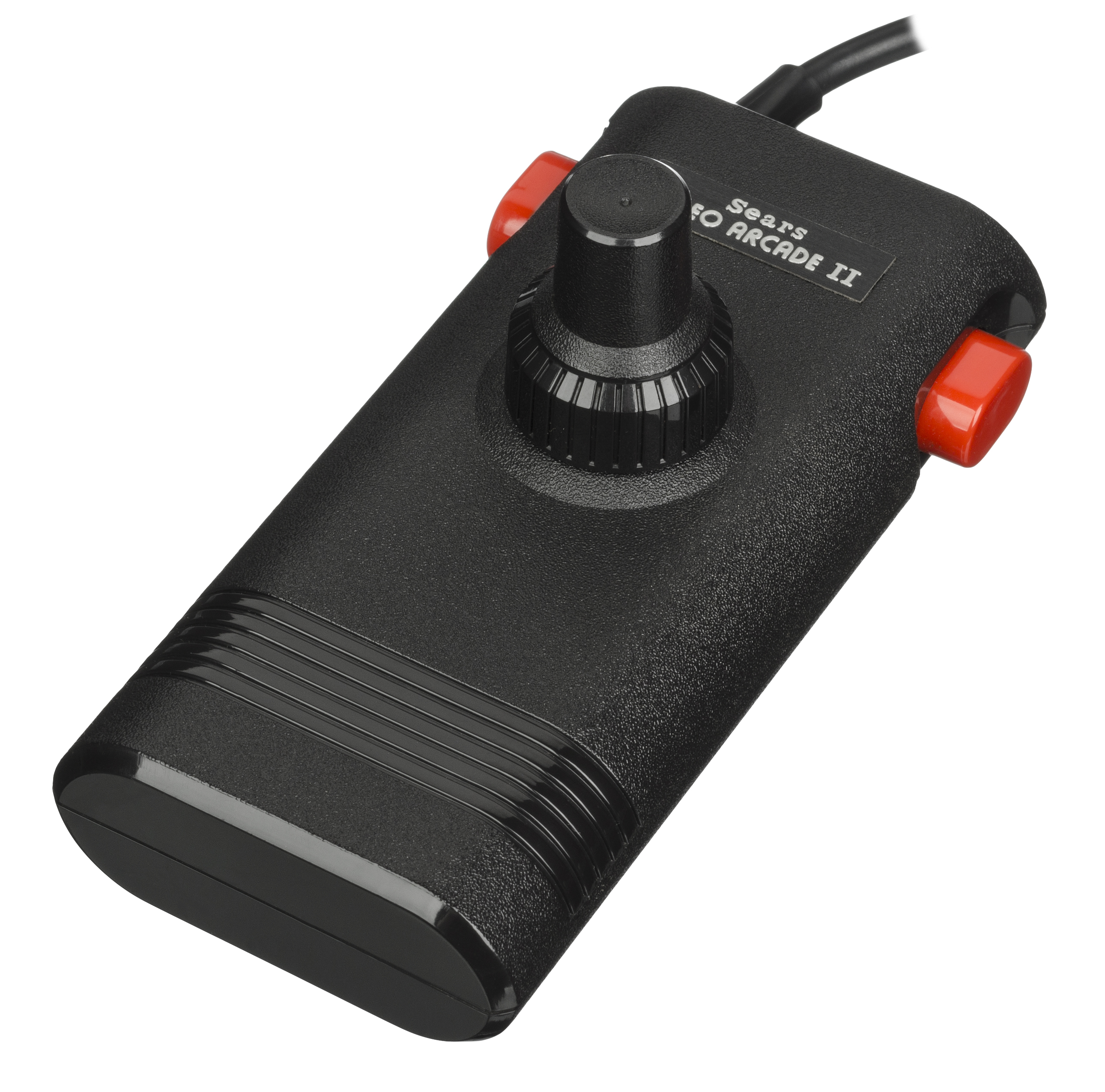
Sears Video Arcade II Controller with integrated paddle

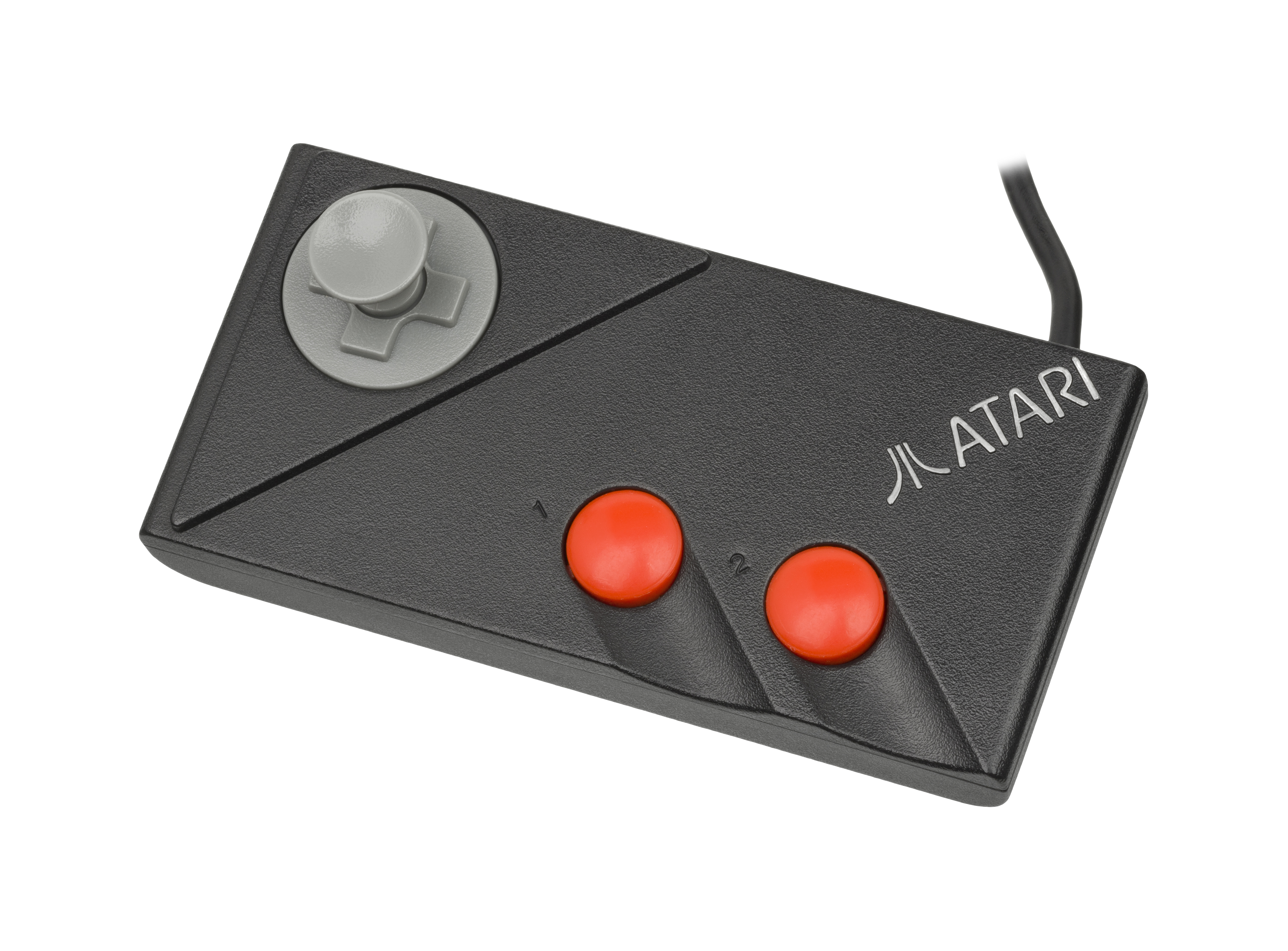
CX78 Power Control Pad (only for European 2600 Jr)

== Console models ==
=== Six switch models ===
There were two different designs for the six switch models, so named for the six prominent aluminium switch levers present on the control panel. Both designs incorporated a switch board and a motherboard which were connected by a 12-pin ribbon cable. Both designs were originally sold in North America with or without an additional switch accessible via a hole in the bottom which can toggle the console's TV output to either channel 2 or channel 3. Those without the switch can output only on channel 3, which was the VHF channel originally least used in the most populous broadcast regions. In addition to the traditional "Atari" branded consoles, Sears, Roebuck and Co. purchased the rights to sell Atari consoles in their stores under their Tele-Games store brand, with the console itself labeled as the Sears "Video Arcade." Sears released several versions of the 2600 as the Sears Video Arcade series from 1977 to 1983. These include the "Heavy Sixer" model in 1977, the "Light Sixer" model in 1978, the "4 switch" model in 1980, and an analog to the "Atari 2600 Junior" model.

==== CX2600 "Heavy Sixer" ====
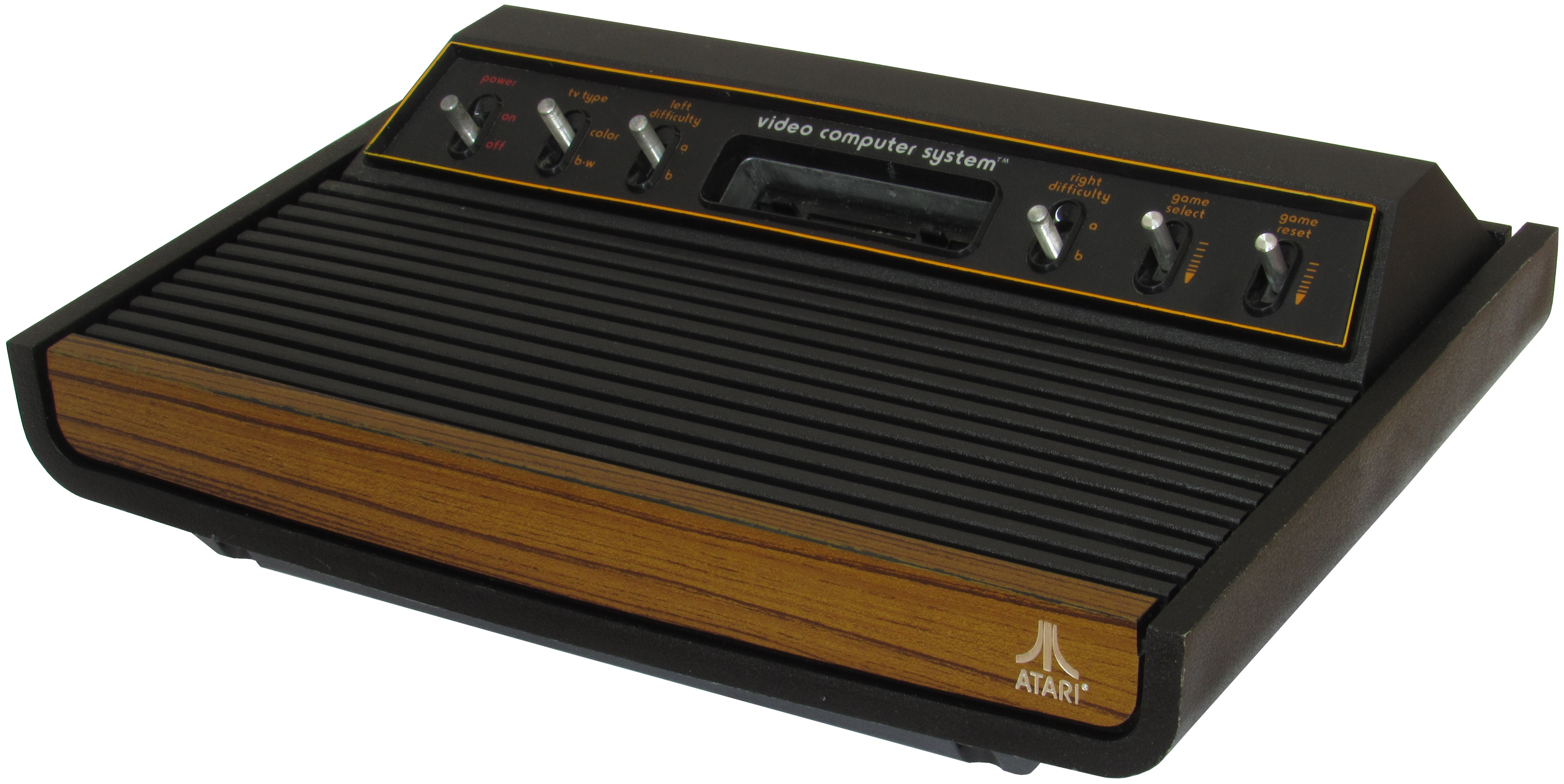
The CX2600 "Heavy Sixer"

In the first year of production (1977), Atari manufactured the CX2600 with heavy aluminum radio-frequency shielding as well as 1/2-inch-thick (12 mm) plastic bottom half. These early units are differentiated from subsequent units by their thick plastic molding on the sides of the case, the curved molding on the front of the unit, as well as their heavier weight. Due to their heavier weight, these early consoles are sometimes referred to as "Heavy Sixers". The majority of the Heavy Sixer consoles were manufactured in Sunnyvale, California, after which Atari moved most console manufacturing overseas. Originally these consoles came with a grey power supply and spring-loaded joysticks, which differed slightly from the later models. Due to the generally higher quality parts and components that are used in these early models, collectors and enthusiasts claim that the Heavy Sixers have superior color to the subsequent 4 switch and Light Sixer models. The Heavy Sixers are considered rare given their limited production run before the Light Sixer models made their debut.

In addition to the Atari-branded Heavy Sixer, Atari also produced a version of the console for Sears called "Video Arcade". The Sears Video Arcade sports aluminium trim, the brand "Tele-Games" printed in green capital letters above the cartridge slot, the brand "Video Arcade" printed in chrome letters on the front right hand corner, and faux marbleized wood, but is otherwise identical to the Atari-branded console. These models can also be identified by the white paper label located underneath the console itself, which identifies the unit as being manufactured by Atari for "Sears Roebuck and Co." Sears also sold their own "Sears" branded paddle controllers for the Heavy Sixer.

==== CX2600 "Light Sixer" ====
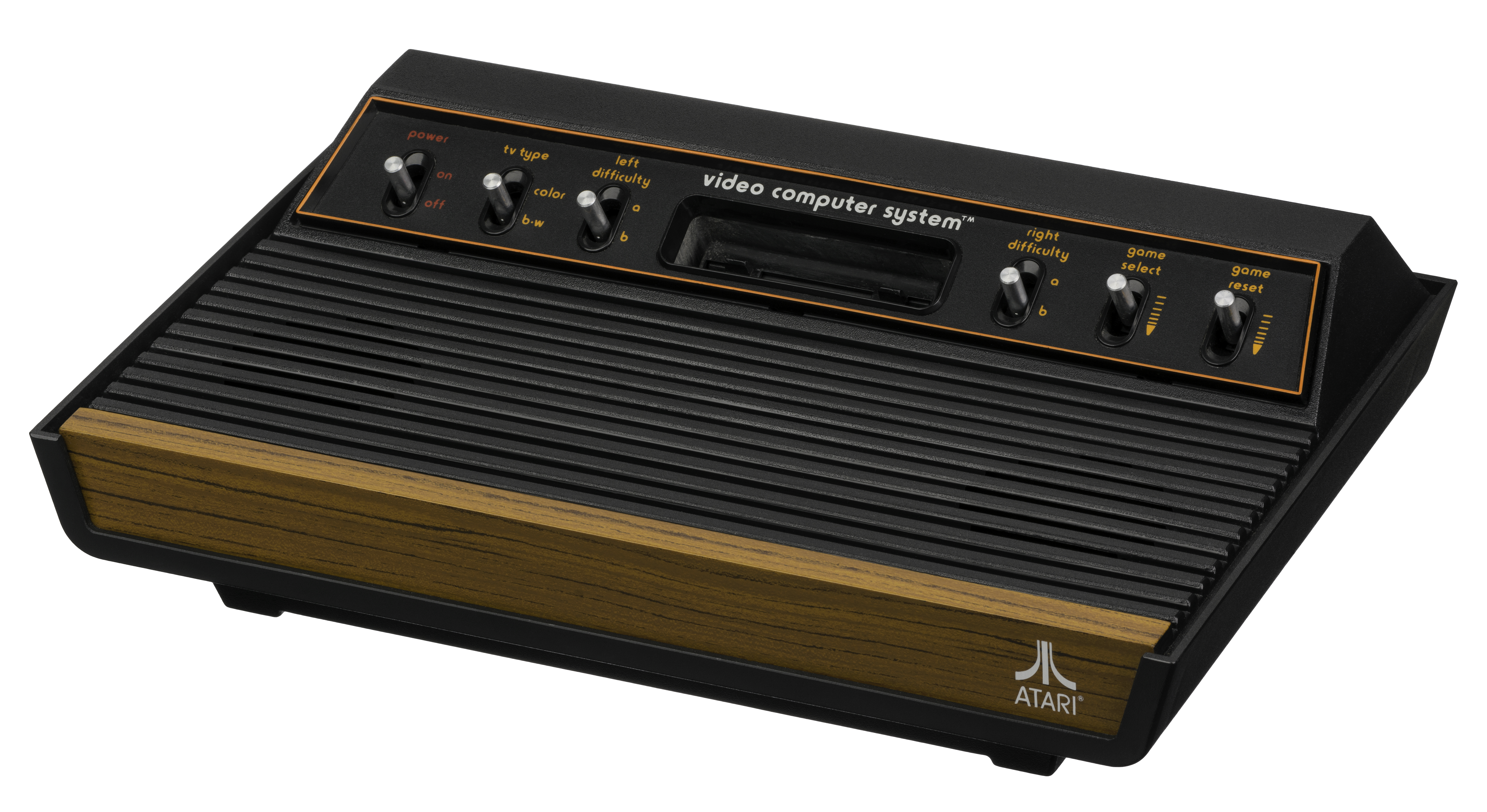
The CX2600 "Light Sixer"

These models were introduced in 1978 and stayed in production for about two years. The thick molding on the sides and curved molding on the front gave way to thinner and more sharply angled molding reducing the weight of the system. The front right and left molding are angular and overlap the woodgrain. The thick RF shielding remained until the four switch models came out. Atari also produced a version of the "Light Sixer" for Sears, which had some minor aesthetic differences to the Atari-branded console.

=== Four switch models ===
These models also have two different designs, but retained much of the same plastic moldings as the Light Sixer. The major difference between the four-switch models and the Light Sixer is that there are only four switches on the main control panel. The two difficulty switches were moved from the front of the console to the upper back, alongside the controller ports, power jack, and channel selection switch (which was no longer optional but now included on all North American consoles). Instead of having two separate boards connected through a ribbon cable, the CX2600-A has one motherboard, which is oriented at an angle inside the case. This resulted in the controller ports moving from the lower back to the upper back of the console.

==== CX2600-A ====
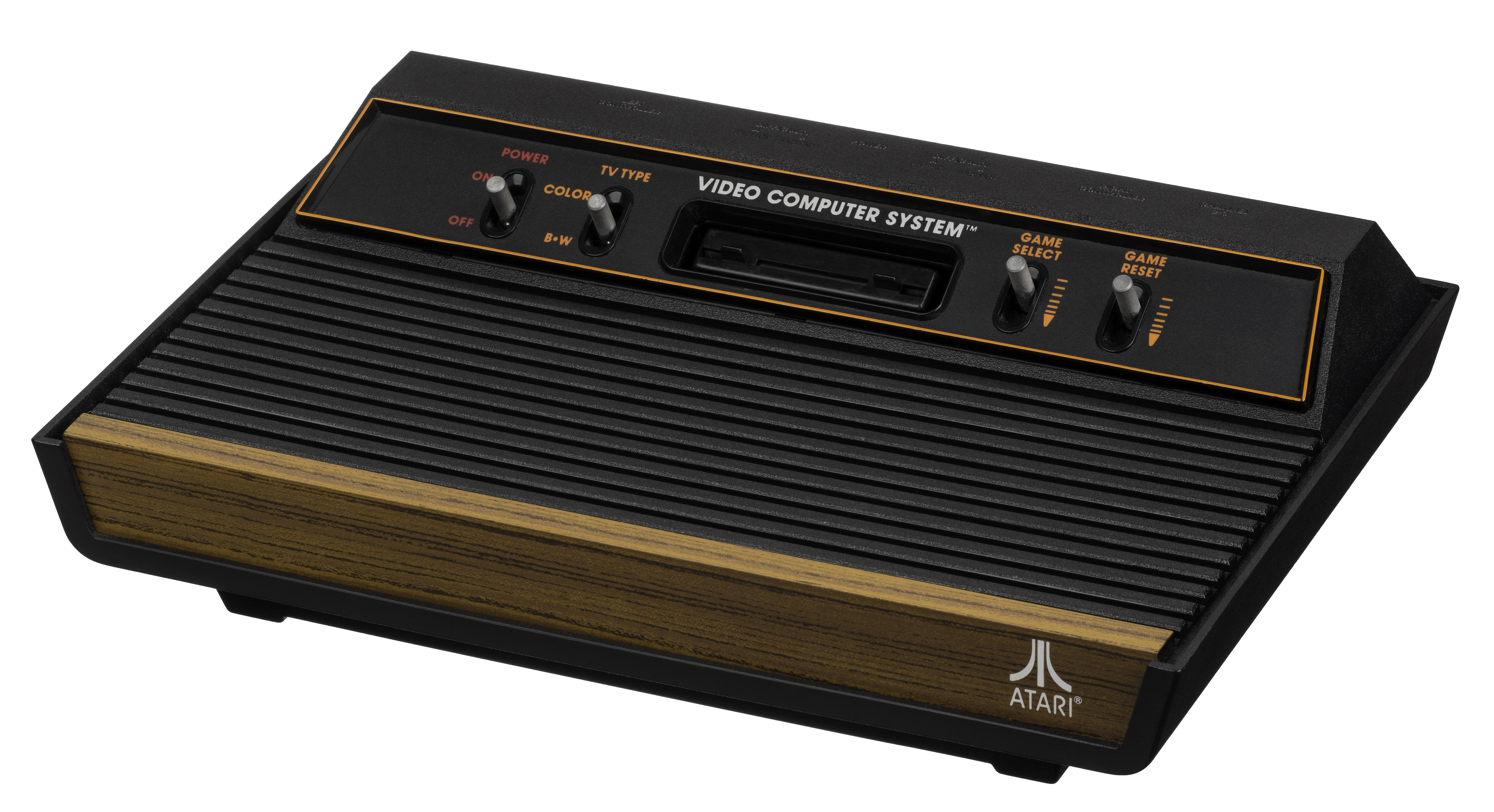
The 4-switch CX2600-A

This model was introduced in 1980. Some early examples of this console used the same lower case mold as the light sixers, with a piece of thin plastic adhered over several now-unneeded holes.

==== Atari 2500 ====
The Atari 2500 is a prototype created in 1981. It was intended as a replacement for the existing 2600, but never saw release. The technical specifications are no different from the Atari 2600, except for combination joystick/paddle controllers installed in the system itself (though normal controllers were usable). It is light grey, and appears sleeker than current model 2600s.

==== Atari 2600 ====
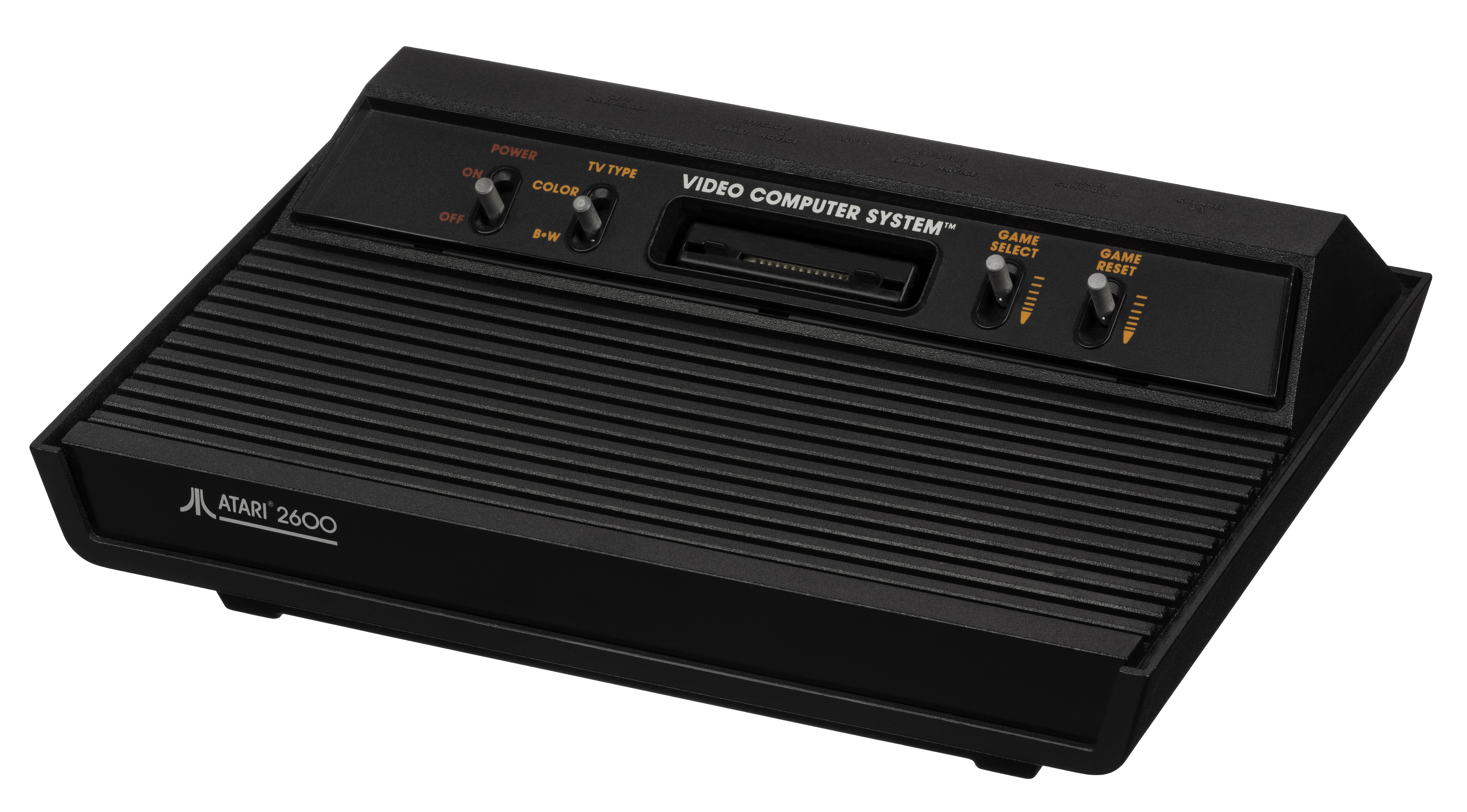
The Atari 2600 "Darth Vader"

This model was introduced in 1982 and was the first to use "2600" in its name (the previous models all being officially named the "Video Computer System"). Besides containing a different logo than earlier models, this model does not have woodgrain on the front and is primarily black, resulting in the nickname of "Darth Vader".

==== Atari 2600 Jr. ====
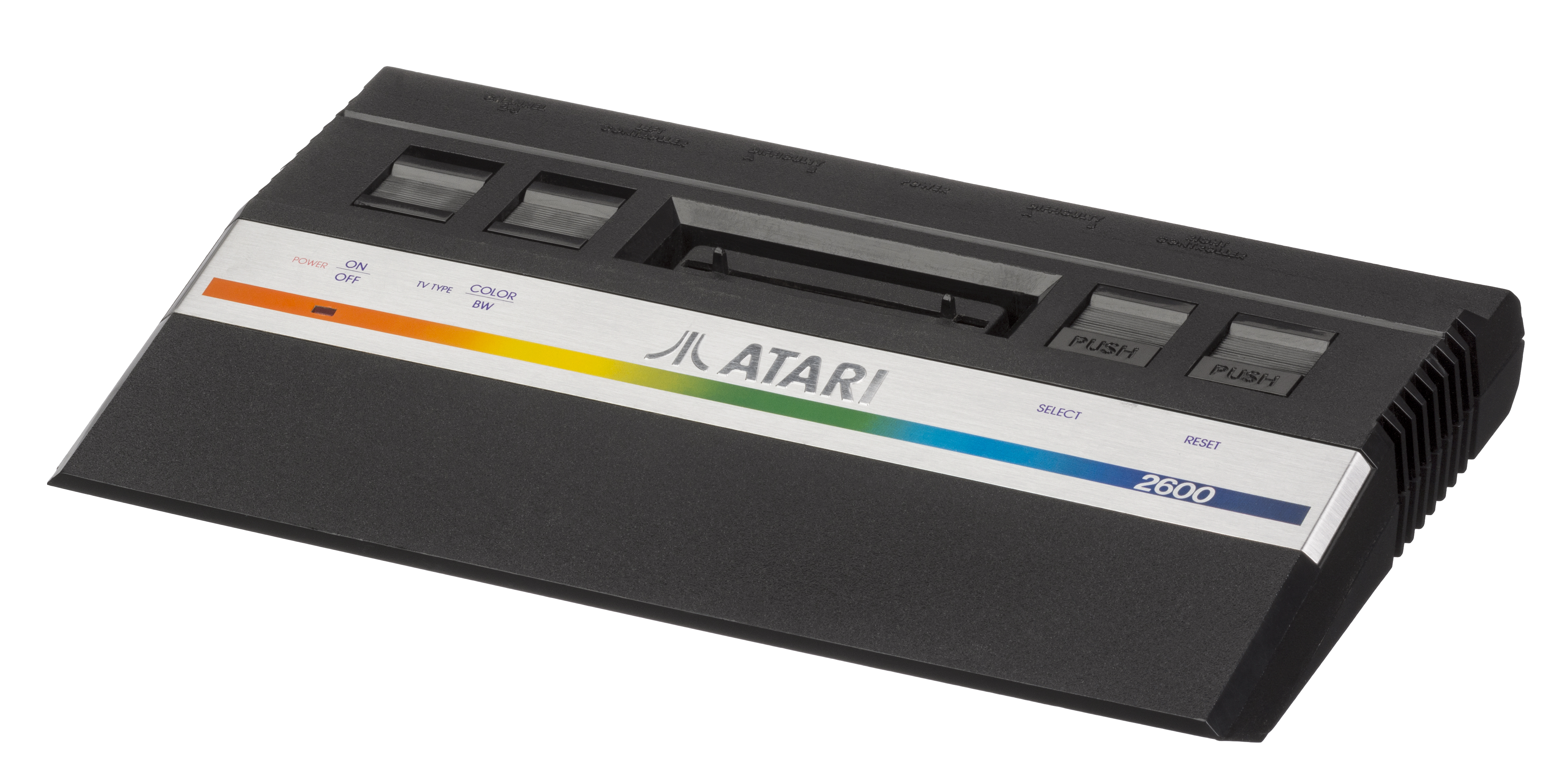
The Atari 2600 Jr.

In 1986, a new version of the 2600 was released (although it was planned for release two years earlier). The new redesigned version of the 2600, unofficially referred to as the 2600 Jr., features a smaller, cost-reduced form factor with a modernized Atari 7800-like appearance. The redesigned 2600 was advertised as a budget gaming system (under $50) that has the ability to run a large collection of classic games. There are several minor stylistic variations of the 2600 Jr. design, including the "large rainbow" (shown at right), "small rainbow", and the rare all-black "Irish" version (made in Ireland).

== Motherboard revisions ==
The Atari 2600 VCS Domestic Field Service Manual describes the differences as follows:

2600A model revisions 1-13
In addition to the component changes, the physical location of several parts has also been changed. Instead of having the right and left difficulty switches placed on top of the game console, they are located at the rear, next to the game controller plugs. The channel selector switch is also located at the rear of the console. The game cartridge socket is no longer angled, but is mounted vertically on the board.
2600A model differences - revisions 14 and 15
Revisions 14 and 15 contain the model differences described above, and in addition have new components on the TIA lines, LM1 and Sync. There are two 1N914 diodes to prevent feedback on the lines and two additional pull-up resistors to insure the signal is at +5v. To compensate for any signal loss, R215 and 217 have been changed to 47K (R215) and 24K (R217).

2600A model differences - revisions 16 and up
Revisions 16 and up contain the model differences described above; they also include a timer chip (A205) added to the reset circuitry of the MPU chip. This chip eliminates the problem of power-on reset failures.
2600AP model differences - revision 6
Specs about this Atari 2600AP need to be added / edited by experts (1981 - C017879 Rev. 6)

Atari 2600 hardware internals

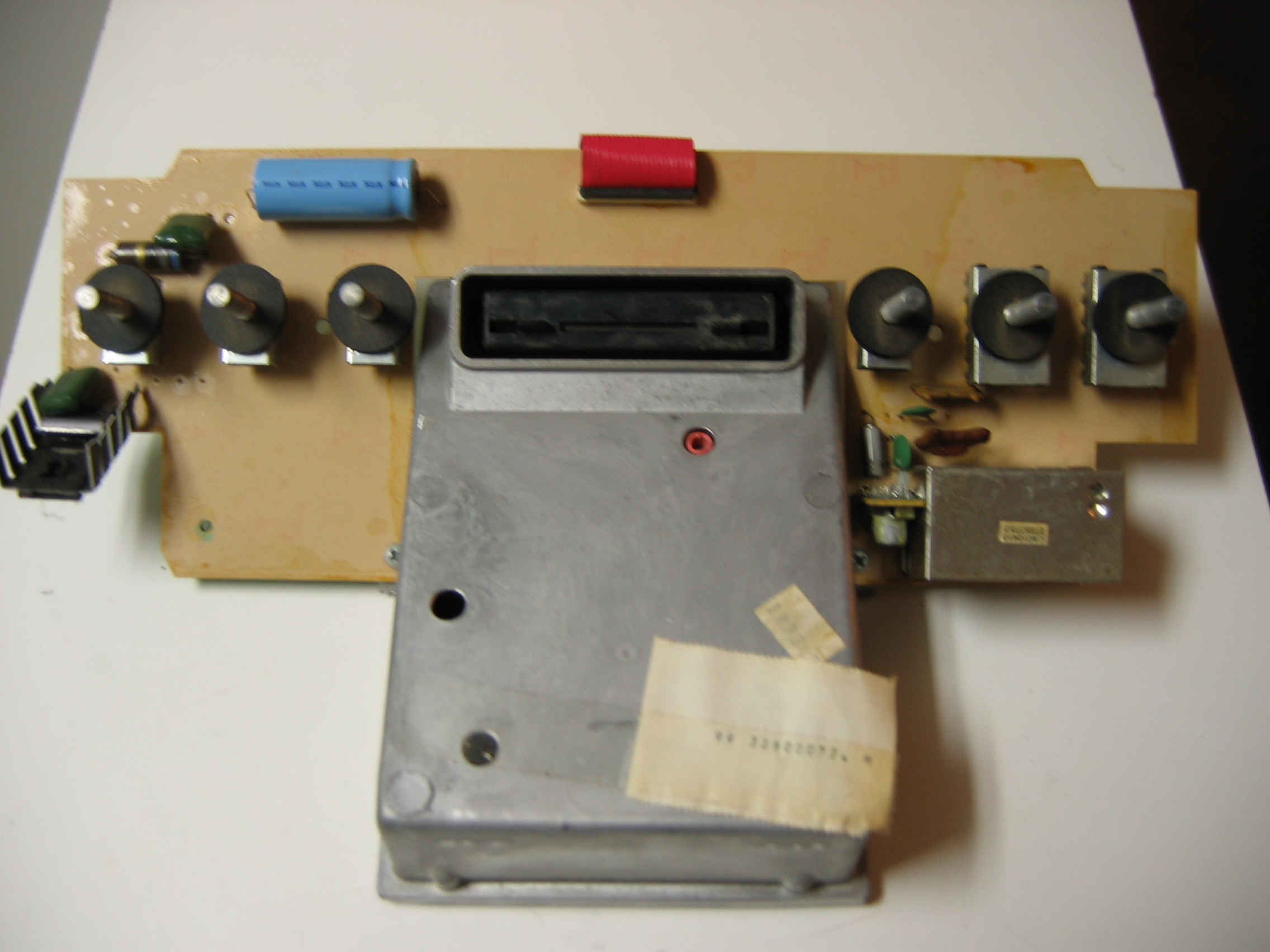
CX2600 Sunnyvale "Heavy Sixer"

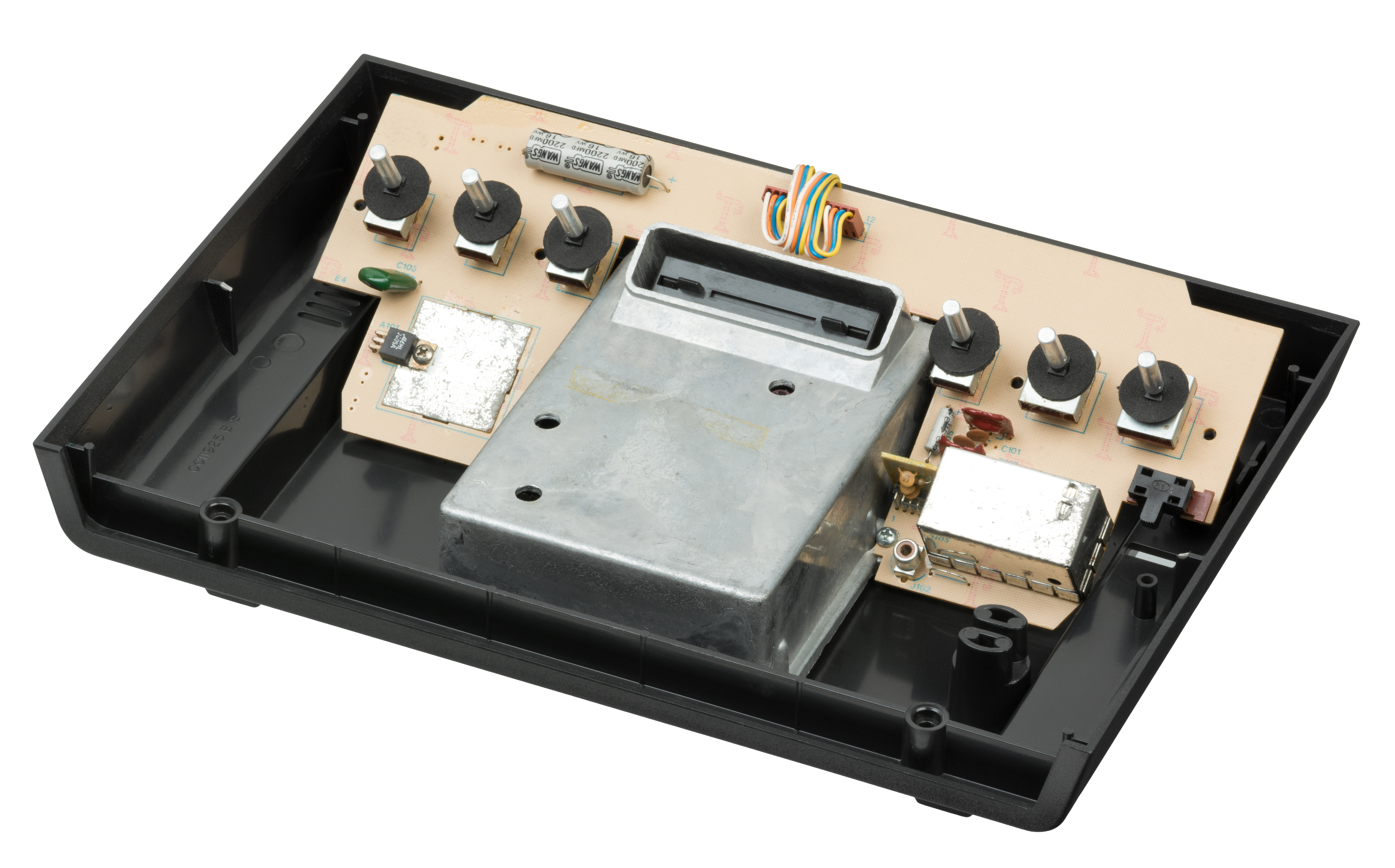
CX2600 "Light Sixer"

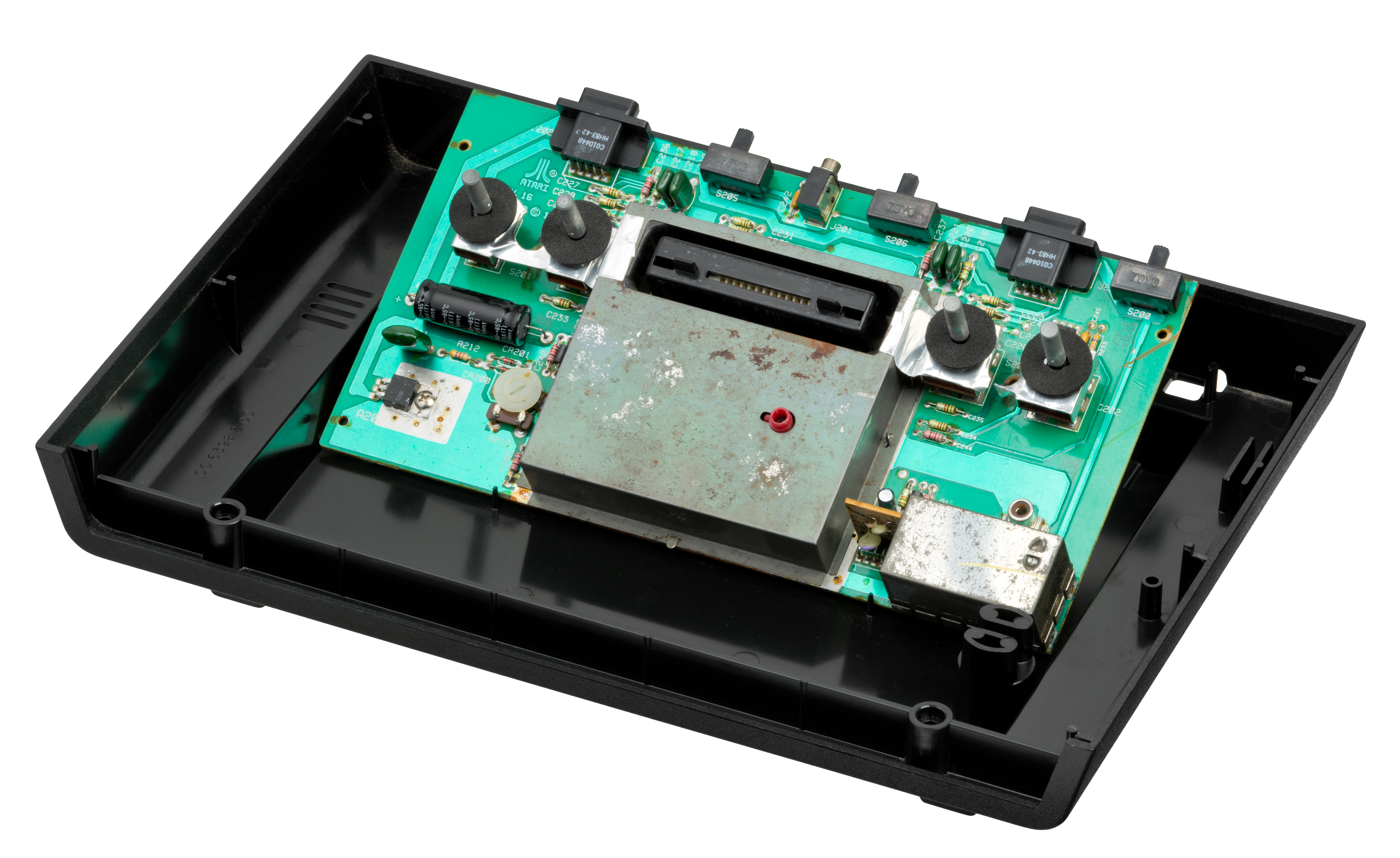
CX2600A "Darth Vader" model

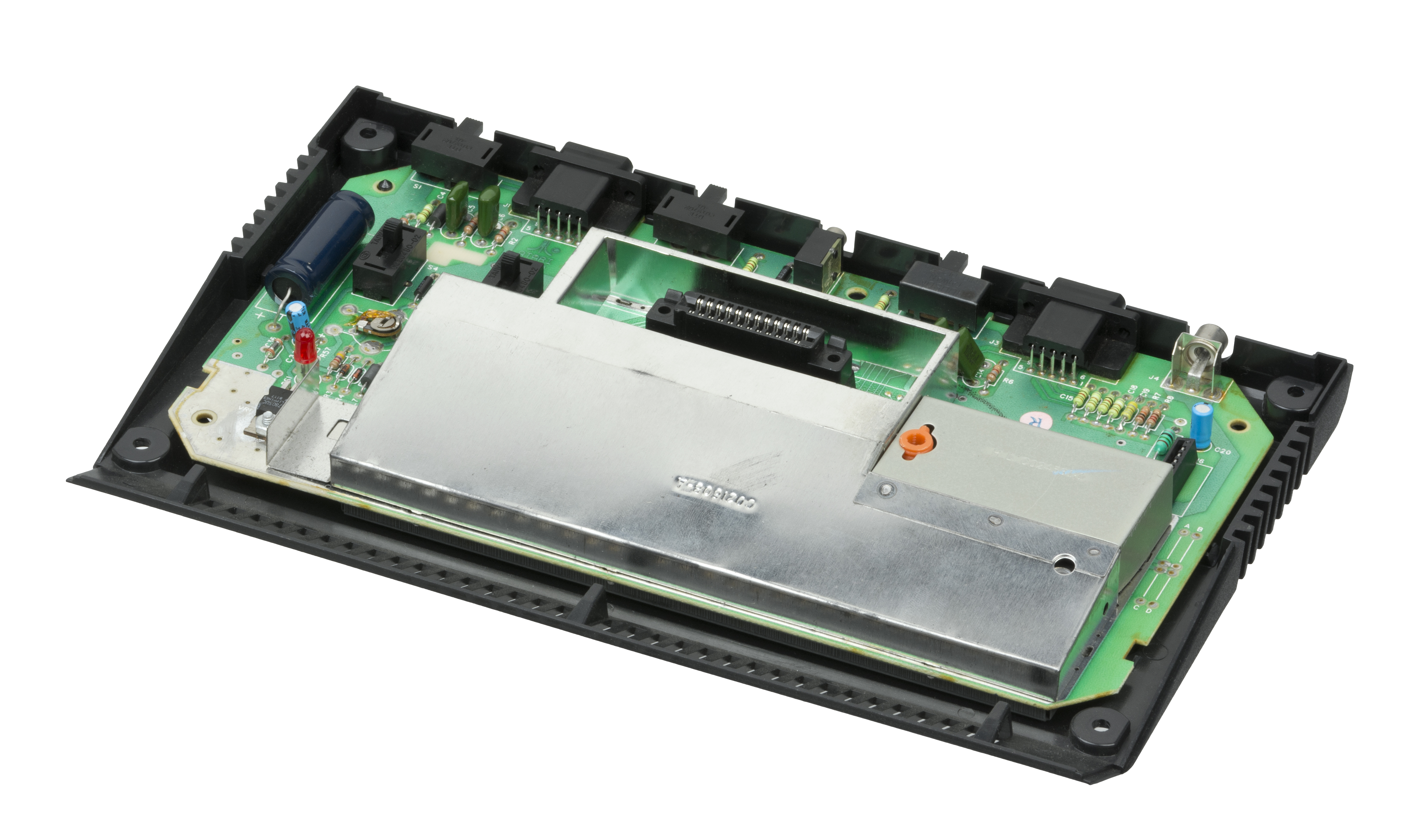
An Atari Jr.

Motherboard flat shots

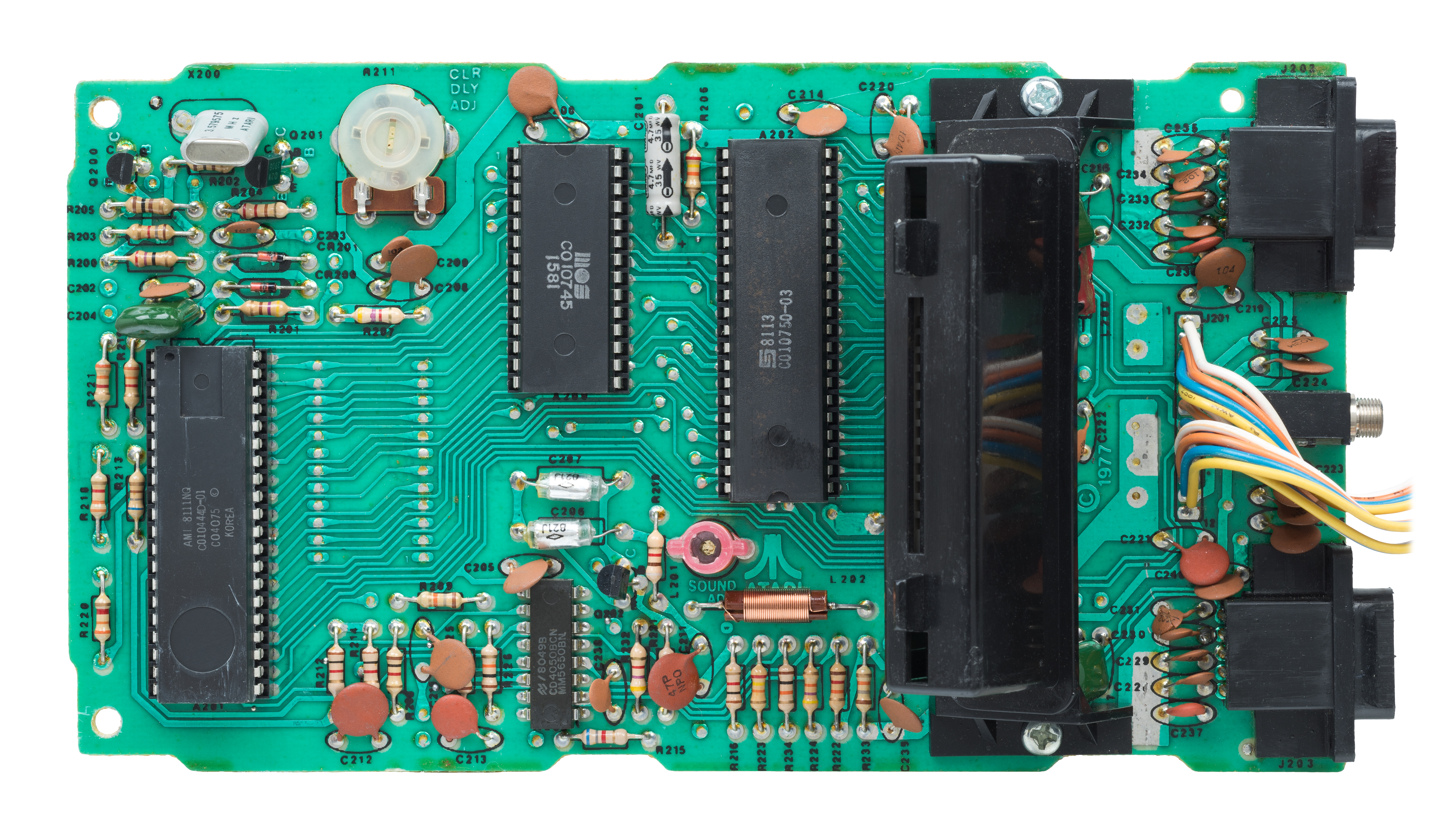
REV B C010433 (CX2600 Light Sixer)

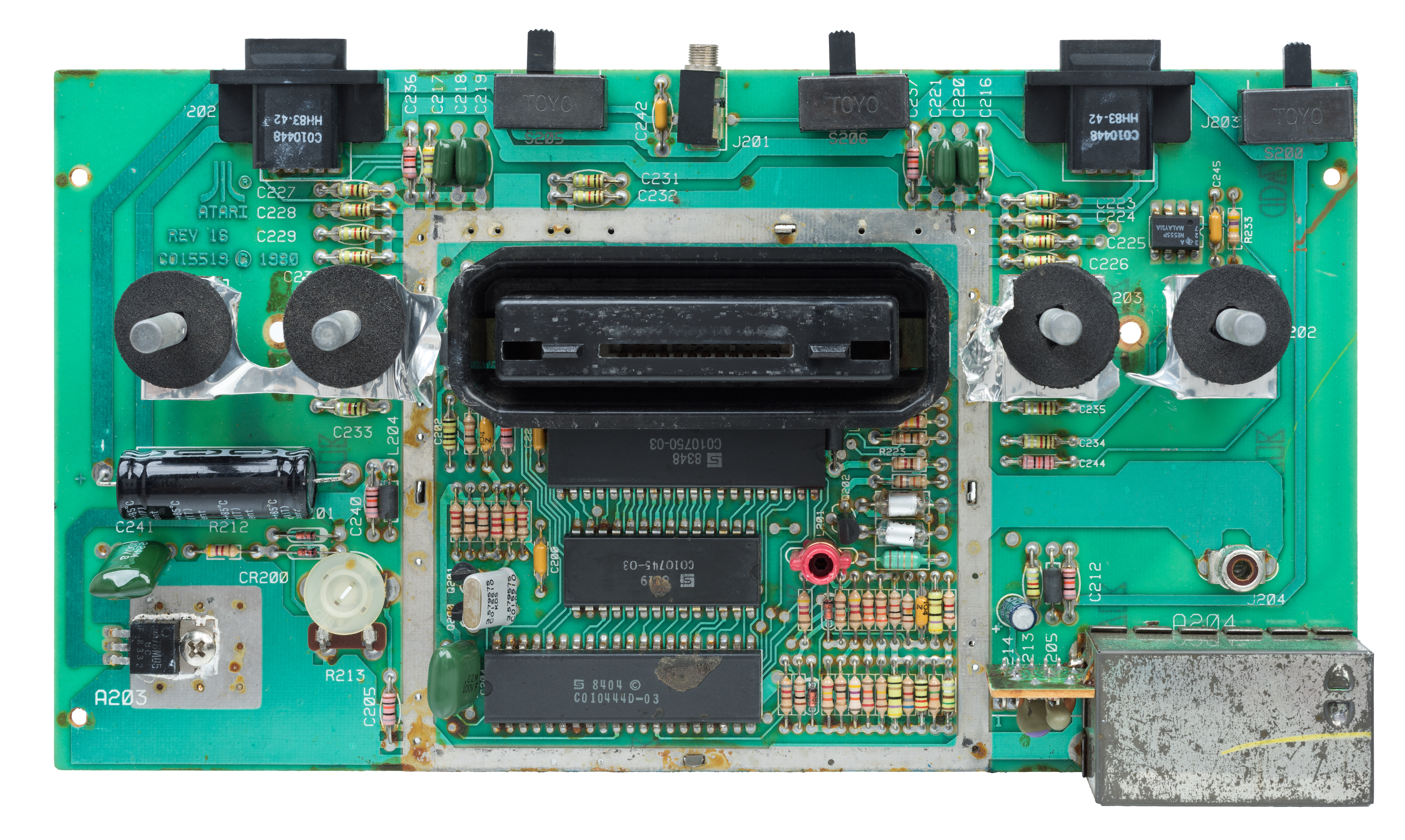
REV 16 C015519 (CX2600A Darth Vader)

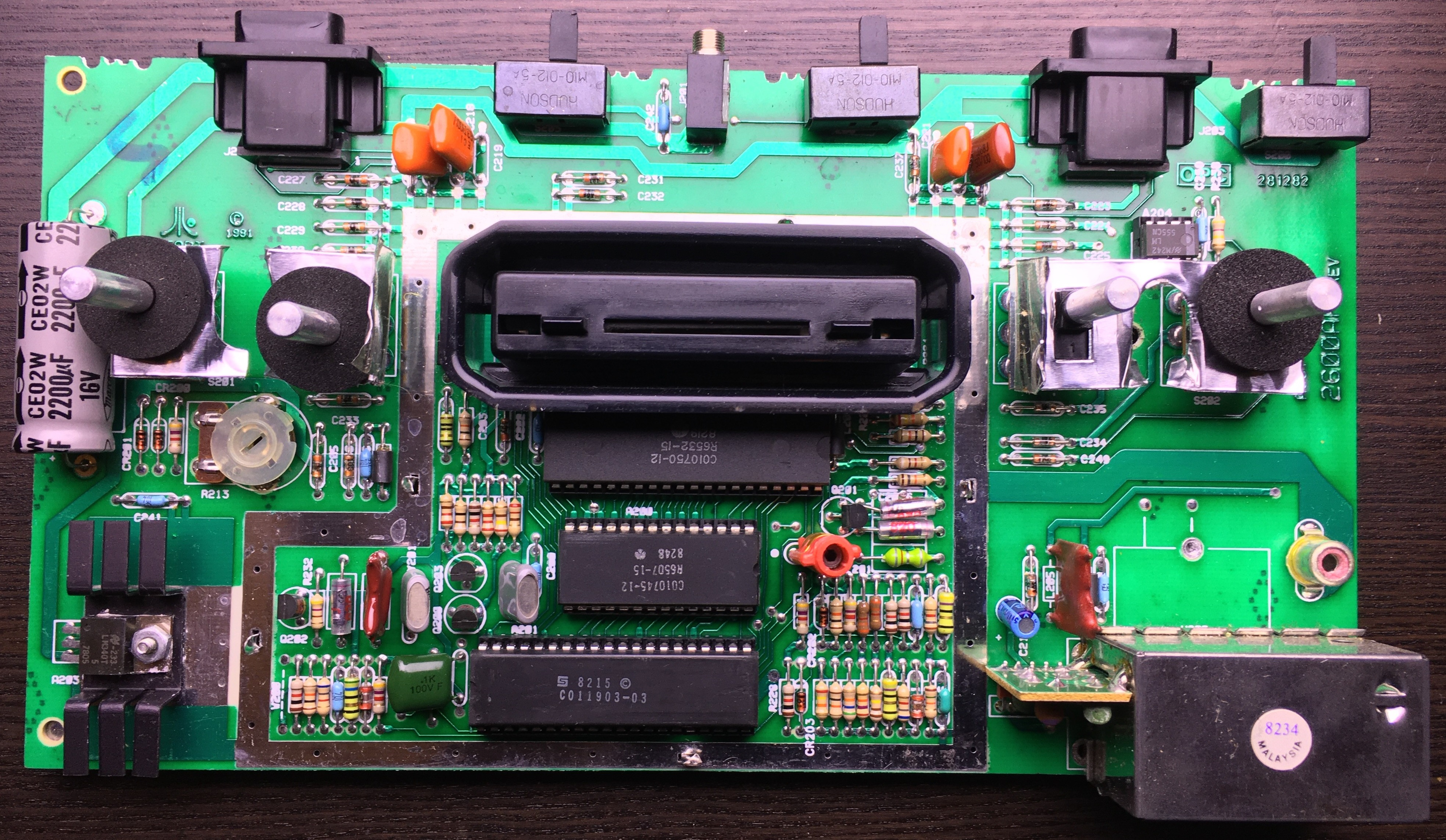
REV 6 C017879 (CX2600AP Darth Vader)

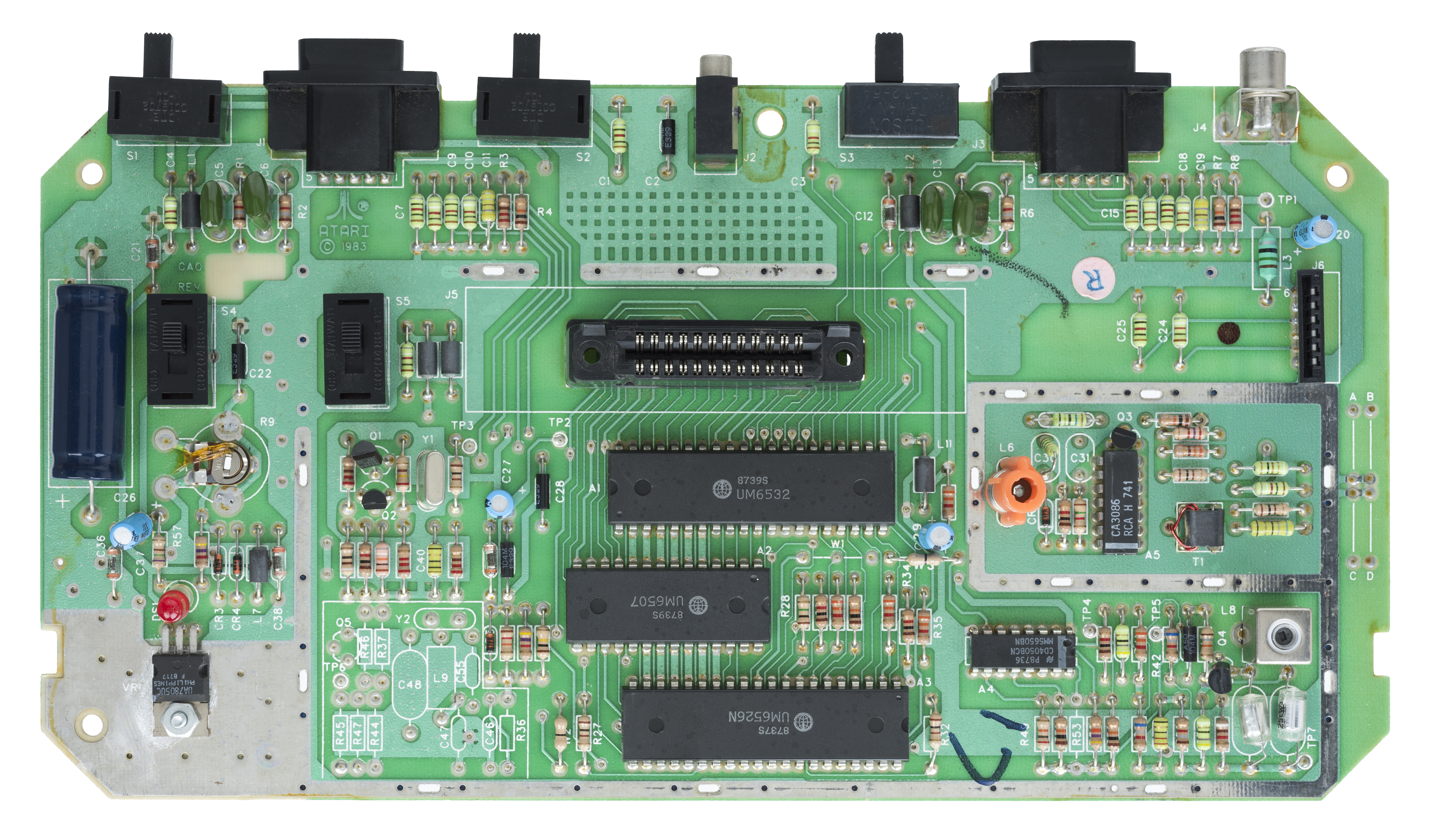
REV F C021503 (Atari Jr.)

== Color palette ==
The Atari 2600 uses different color palettes depending on the television signal format used. With the NTSC format, a 128-color palette is available, while in PAL, only 104 colors are available. Additionally, the SECAM palette consists of only 8 colors.

Only the Television Interface Adaptor (TIA) IC chip (part number CO10444 in NTSC flavor) is different for NTSC and PAL markets. SECAM units use a daughterboard adapter to convert the output. The CPU chip CO10745, and combination Ram+I/O chip CO10750 were used throughout the 2600's production for all regions.

== Third-party peripherals ==
- Starpath Supercharger, a cartridge with a cassette player connector, giving 6 1/8 KB RAM capacity
- GameLine Master Module, a modem allowing downloads of games from an extensive catalog which could be playable for a limited amount of time.
- Yoko Game Copier, a device that allows the user to copy the ROM from a cartridge to a blank cartridge. The Yoko Game Copier was distributed by C.K.B. in Europe.
- Coleco Kid Vid system, a specially adapted cassette recorder that, in a similar manner to the 1984 ZX Spectrum game Deus Ex Machina, automatically synchronized the on-screen gameplay to audio from a cassette tape. Only two games were released using this module: Berenstain Bears and The Smurfs Save the Day.
