= Atari =

Video gaming brand

- One of the variants of the Atari "Fuji" logo
- Product type: Video games; Consumer electronics
- Current owner: Atari Interactive (1998–present) (Note: Known as Hasbro Interactive from 1998 to 2001 and Infogames Interactive from 2001 to 2003)
- Country: United States (Atari, Inc.); Luxembourg (Atari SA)
- Introduced: June 27, 1972; 54 years ago
- Markets: Video gaming
- Previous owners: Atari (1972–1985); Atari Corporation (1984–1998); Atari Games (1985–1999) (Note: For use in arcade business only. Later adopted the Midway Games brand.)
- Website: atari.com

Atari (/əˈtɑːri/) is a brand name that has been owned by several entities since its inception in 1972. It is currently owned by Luxembourgish holding company Atari SA (formerly Infogrames) (Note: Through a subsidiary named Atari Interactive which licenses the brand to its parent and other entities in the group) and its focus is on "video games, consumer hardware, and licensing".

The original Atari, Inc. was founded in Sunnyvale, California, United States, in 1972 by Nolan Bushnell and Ted Dabney. This company was a pioneer in arcade games, home video game consoles, and home computers. The company's products, such as Pong and the Atari 2600, helped define the electronic entertainment industry from the 1970s to the mid-1980s.

After the video game crash of 1983, the assets of the home console and computer divisions of the original Atari Inc. were sold off to Jack Tramiel's Tramel Technology Ltd. in 1984, which then renamed itself to Atari Corporation, while the remaining part of Atari, Inc. was renamed Atari Games Inc. In early 1985, Warner established a new corporation jointly with Namco subsequently named Atari Games Corporation, which took control of Atari's coin-operated games division. The rights to Atari, Inc.'s game properties were shared between the two companies: Atari Corporation receiving the trademarks and the home rights, while Atari Games receiving the rights to use the logo and brand name with appended text "Games" on arcade products. In 1996, Atari Corporation reverse-merged with disk-drive manufacturer JT Storage (JTS) and effectively perished. In 1998, Hasbro Interactive, part of the toy company Hasbro, acquired all Atari Corporation–related properties from JTS, as part of a subsidiary which it then renamed Atari Interactive. Meanwhile, Atari Games was acquired by Midway Games in 1996, and effectively retired the Atari name on arcades by 2000 to avoid public confusion with Hasbro's Atari home releases.

Infogrames Entertainment (IESA) – precursor of the present-day Atari SA – became the new owner of the Atari brand after buying Hasbro Interactive in 2001, renaming it Infogrames Interactive, which intermittently published Atari-branded home titles. In 2003, it renamed the division Atari Interactive. Another IESA division called Infogrames Inc., which was founded as GT Interactive, changed its name to Atari, Inc. the same year, licensing the Atari name and logo from its fellow subsidiary. In 2008, IESA completed its acquisition of Atari, Inc.'s outstanding stock, making it a wholly owned subsidiary. IESA renamed itself Atari SA in 2009 which remains the status quo. It sought bankruptcy protection under French law in 2013. On the other hand, Atari's post-1984 arcade titles are the property of Warner Bros. Games since receiving the assets following Midway's bankruptcy in 2009.

As of March 31, 2025, the Group’s workforce represented 90 people, including 66 in the United States, 23 in India, and 1 in France. At March 31, 2024, the Group's workforce represented 69 people, including 57 in the United States, 11 in India and 1 in France.

== History ==
=== Logotype ===
The name comes from the Japanese term atari, used while playing the ancient board game Go. The word atari means "to hit a target" in Japanese; in Go, it indicates a situation where a player will be able to capture one or more stones of the opponent in the next move.

The Atari logo was designed by George Opperman, who was Atari's first in-house graphic designer, and drawn by Evelyn Seto. The design is known as "Fuji" for its resemblance to the Japanese mountain, although the logo's origins are unrelated to it. Opperman designed the logo intending for the silhouette to look like the letter A as in Atari and for its three "prongs" to resemble players and the midline of the "court" in the company's first hit game, Pong.

=== Atari Inc. (1972–1984) ===
Atari consoles release timeline
1975	Atari-Telegames Home Pong
1976
1977	Atari Ultra Pong Doubles
1977	Atari Stunt Cycle
1977	Atari Video Pinball Model C-380 (Woodgrain)
1977	Atari Video Pinball Model C-380 (Cream)
1977	Atari-Telegames Pinball Breakaway
1977	Atari VCS (CX2600 "Heavy Sixer") (Original version of the Atari 2600)
1978	Atari VCS (CX2600 "Light Sixer")
1979
1980	Atari VCS (CX2600-A)
1981
1982	Atari 2600 (The first Atari VCS model to officially use the '2600' name)
1982	Atari 5200
1983	Atari 5200 (revision)
1983	Atari 2800 (Japanese version of the Atari 2600)
1984–1985
1986	Atari 2600 Jr.
1986	Atari 7800
1987	Atari 7800 (Different design for EU market)
1987	Atari XEGS
1988
1989	Atari Lynx
1990
1991	Atari Lynx II
1992
1993	Atari Jaguar
1994
1995	Atari Jaguar CD
1996–2020
2021	Atari VCS
2022
2023	Atari 2600+
2024	Atari 7800+
2025	Atari 2600+ PAC-MAN Edition

In 1971, Nolan Bushnell and Ted Dabney founded a small engineering company, Syzygy Engineering, that designed Computer Space, the world's first commercially available arcade video game, for Nutting Associates. On June 27, 1972, the two incorporated Atari, Inc. and soon hired Al Alcorn as its first design engineer. Bushnell asked Alcorn to produce an arcade version of the Magnavox Odyssey's Tennis game, which would be named Pong. Before Atari's incorporation, Bushnell considered various terms from the game Go, eventually choosing atari, referencing a position in the game when a group of stones is imminently in danger of being taken by one's opponent. Atari was incorporated in the state of California on June 27, 1972.

In 1973, Atari secretly spawned a competitor called Kee Games, headed by Nolan's next-door neighbor Joe Keenan, to circumvent pinball distributors' insistence on exclusive distribution deals; both Atari and Kee could market nearly the same game to different distributors, each getting an "exclusive" deal. Joe Keenan's management of the subsidiary led to his appointment as president of Atari when Kee was absorbed into the company in 1974.

In 1975, Atari's Grass Valley, California subsidiary Cyan Engineering started the development of a flexible console that was capable of playing the four existing Atari games. The result was the Atari Video Computer System, or VCS (later renamed 2600 when the 5200 was released). The introductory price of $199 (equivalent to $1,126 in 2025) included a console, two joysticks, a pair of paddles, and the Combat game cartridge. Bushnell knew he had another potential hit on his hands but bringing the machine to market would be extremely expensive. Looking for outside investors, Bushnell sold Atari to Warner Communications in 1976 for $28 million. Nolan continued to have disagreements with Warner Management over the direction of the company, the discontinuation of the pinball division, and most importantly, the notion of discontinuing the 2600. In December 1978, Bushnell was fired as chairman and co-CEO following an argument with Manny Gerard. He decided to leave the company rather than take an advisory role.

The development of a successor to the 2600 started as soon as it shipped. The original team estimated the 2600 had a lifespan of about three years; it then set forth to build the most powerful machine possible within that time frame. Mid-way into its effort the home computer revolution took off, leading to the addition of a keyboard and features to produce the Atari 800 and its smaller sibling, the 400. The new machines had some success when they finally became available in quantity in 1980. From this platform Atari released its next-generation game console in 1982, the Atari 5200. It was unsuccessful due to incompatibility with the 2600 game library, a small quantity of dedicated games, and notoriously unreliable controllers. Porting arcade games to home systems with inferior hardware was difficult. The ported version of Pac-Man for Atari 2600 omitted many of the visual features of the original to compensate for the lack of ROM space and the hardware struggled when multiple ghosts appeared on the screen, creating a flickering effect.

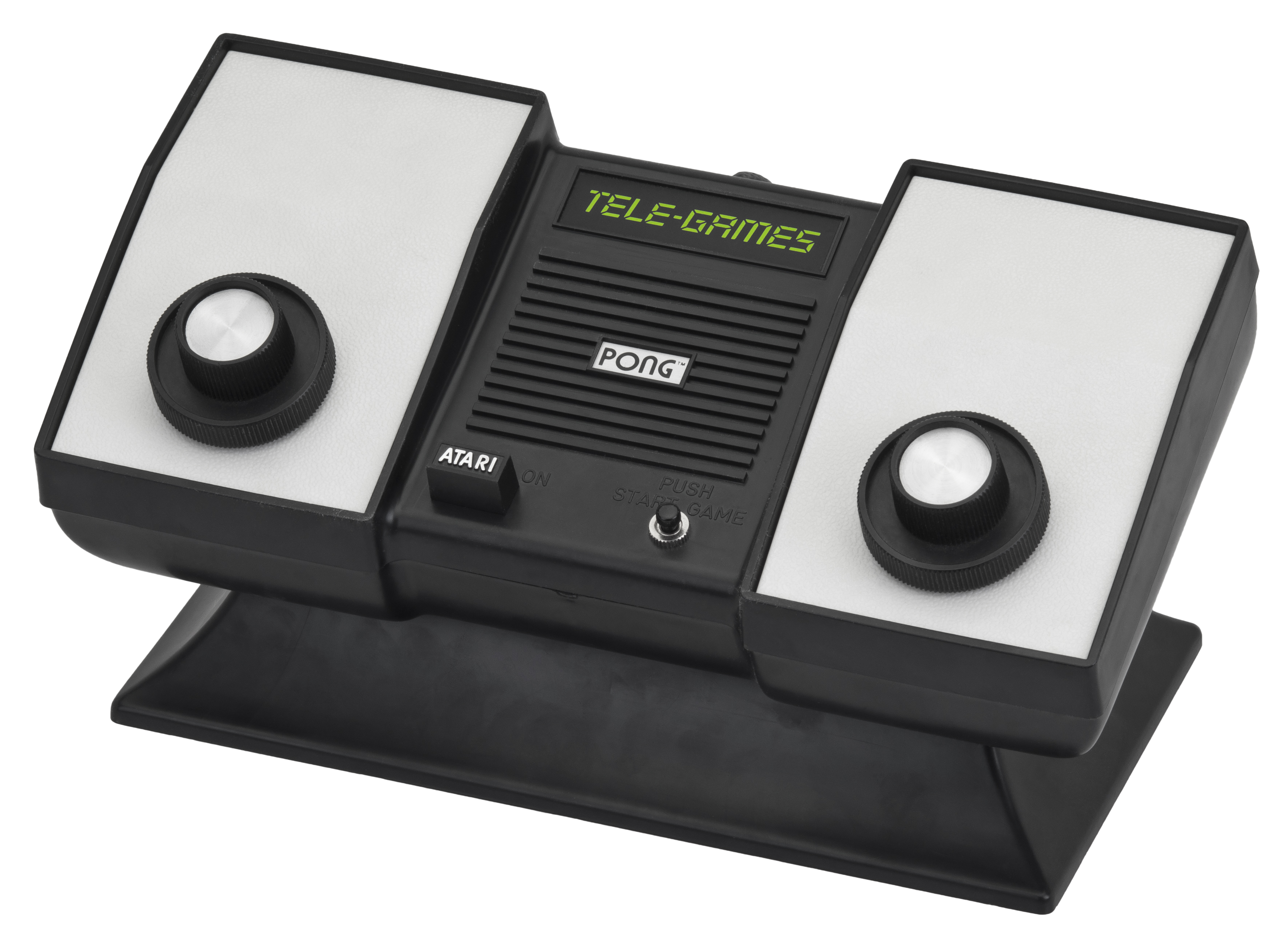
Atari-Telegames Home Pong (1975)

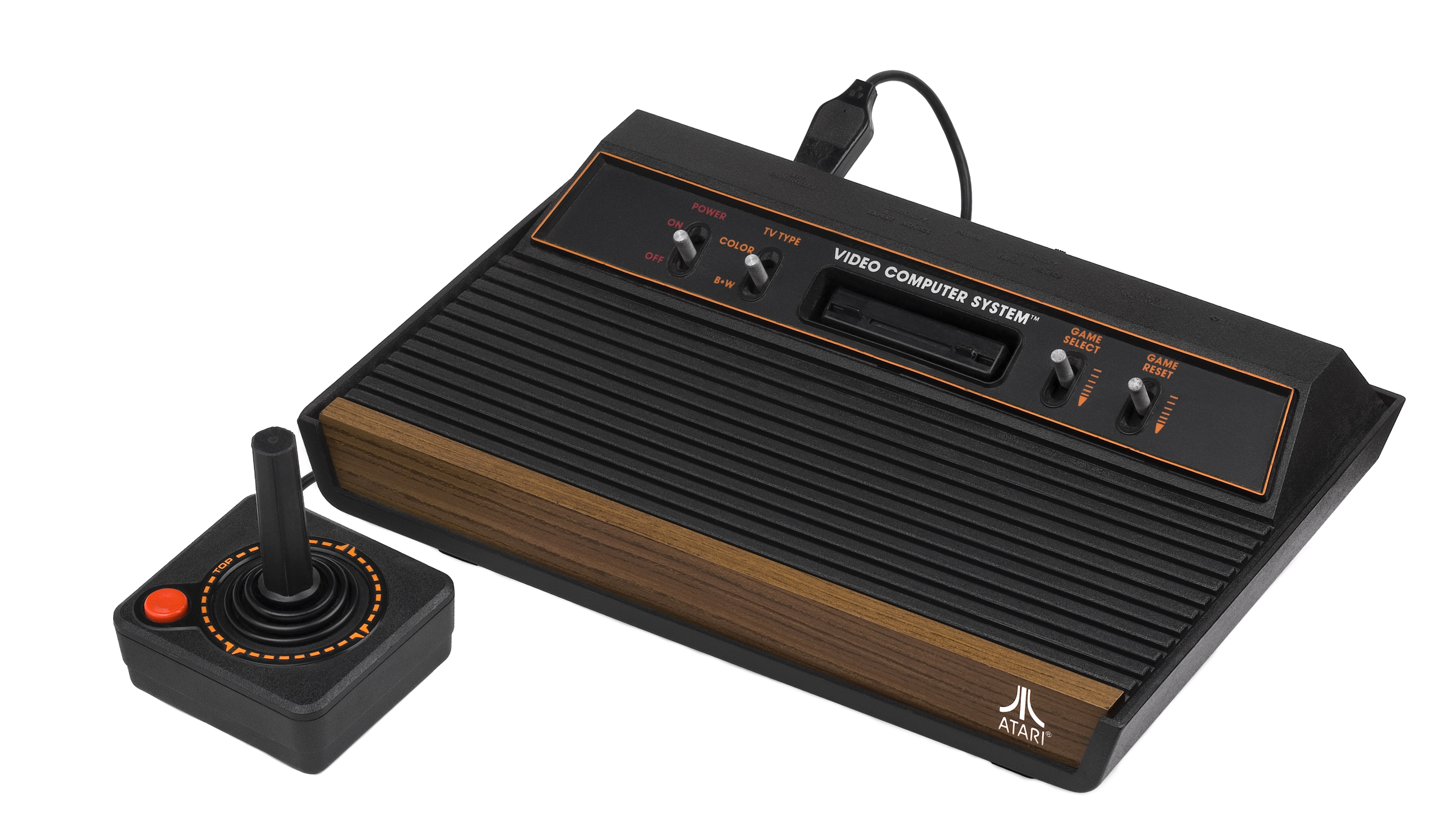
Atari 2600 (1980)

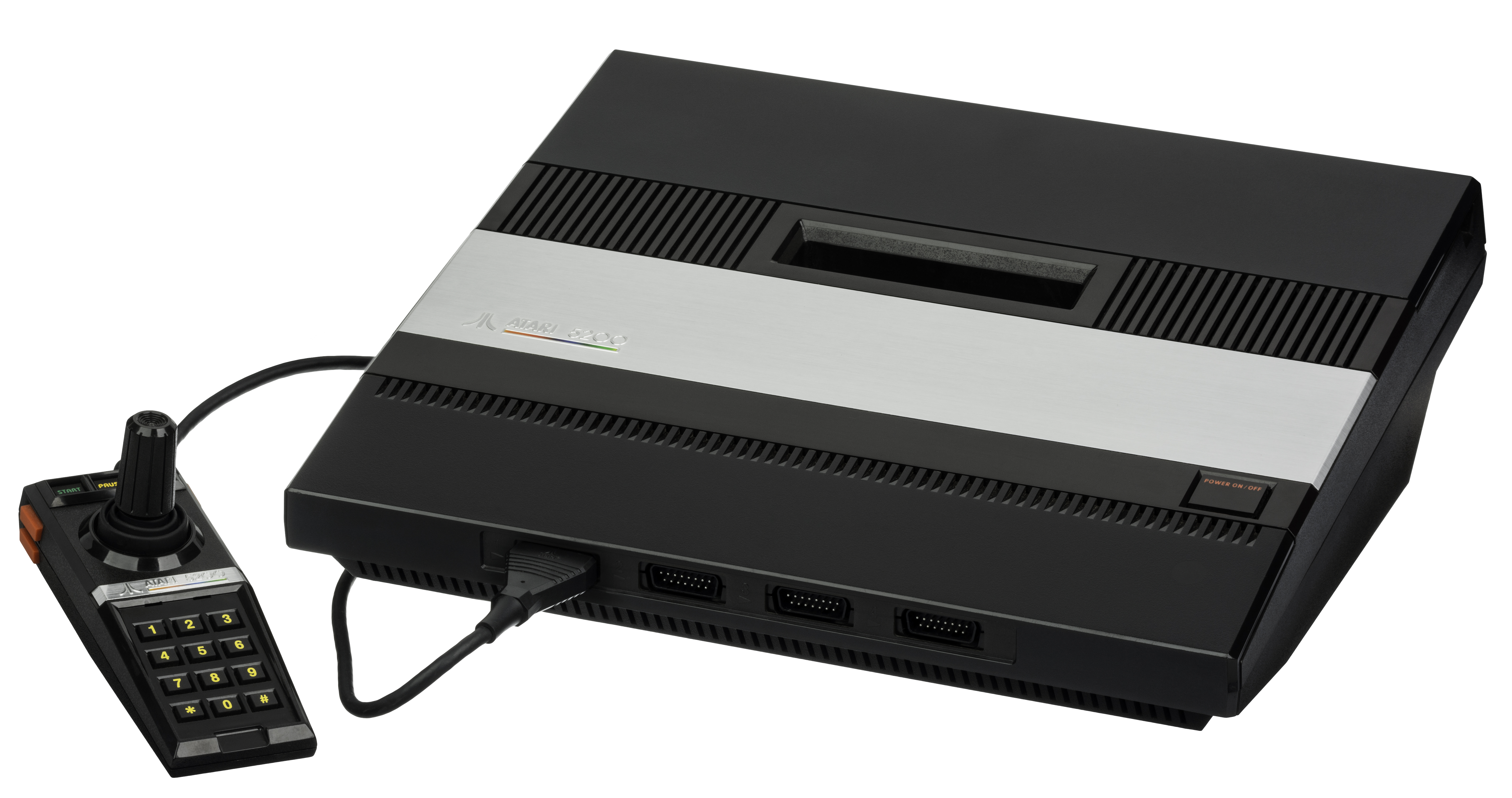
Atari 5200 (1982)

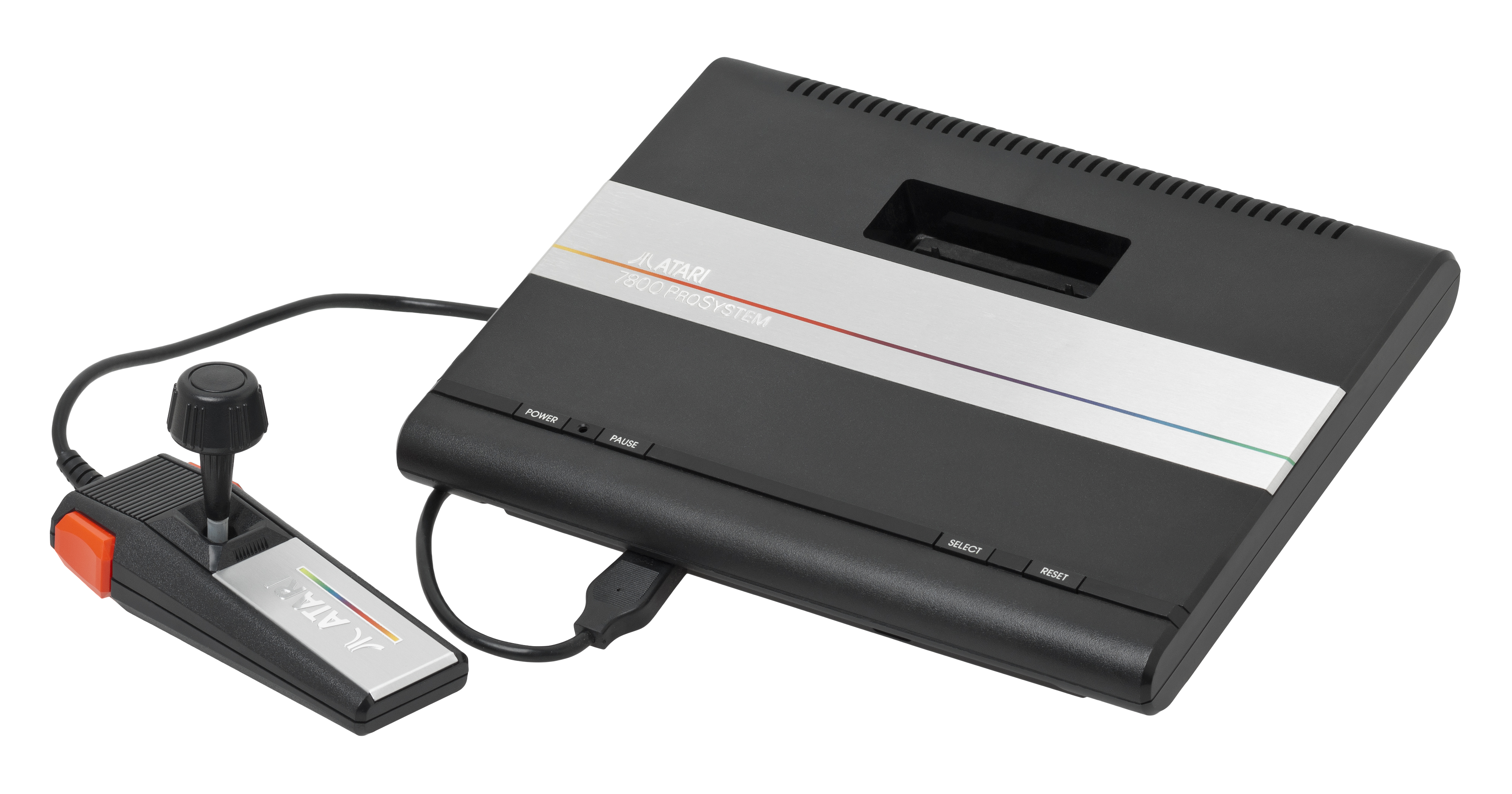
Atari 7800 (1986)

Under Warner and Atari's chairman and CEO, Raymond Kassar, the company achieved its greatest success, selling millions of 2600s and computers. At its peak, Atari accounted for a third of Warner's annual income and was the fastest-growing company in US history at the time. It ran into problems in the early 1980s. Faced with fierce competition and price wars in the game console and home computer markets, Atari was never able to duplicate the success of the 2600.

These problems were followed by the video game crash of 1983, with losses that totaled more than $500 million. Warner's stock price slid from $60 to $20, and the company began searching for a buyer for its troubled division. In 1983, Ray Kassar resigned. Financial problems continued to mount and Kassar's successor, James J. Morgan, had less than a year in which to tackle the company's problems. He began a massive restructuring of the company and worked with Warner Communications in May 1984 to create "NATCO" (an acronym for New Atari Company). NATCO further streamlined the company's facilities, personnel, and spending. Unknown to James Morgan and the senior management of Atari, Warner had been in talks with Tramel Technology to buy assets pertaining to Atari's consumer electronics and home computer businesses. Negotiating until close to midnight on July 1, 1984, Jack Tramiel completed the asset purchase for $240 million in promissory notes and stocks. Warner gained a 20% stake in Tramel Technology, which was renamed Atari Corporation. Warner also sold the Ataritel division to Mitsubishi.

=== Atari Corporation (1984–1996) ===
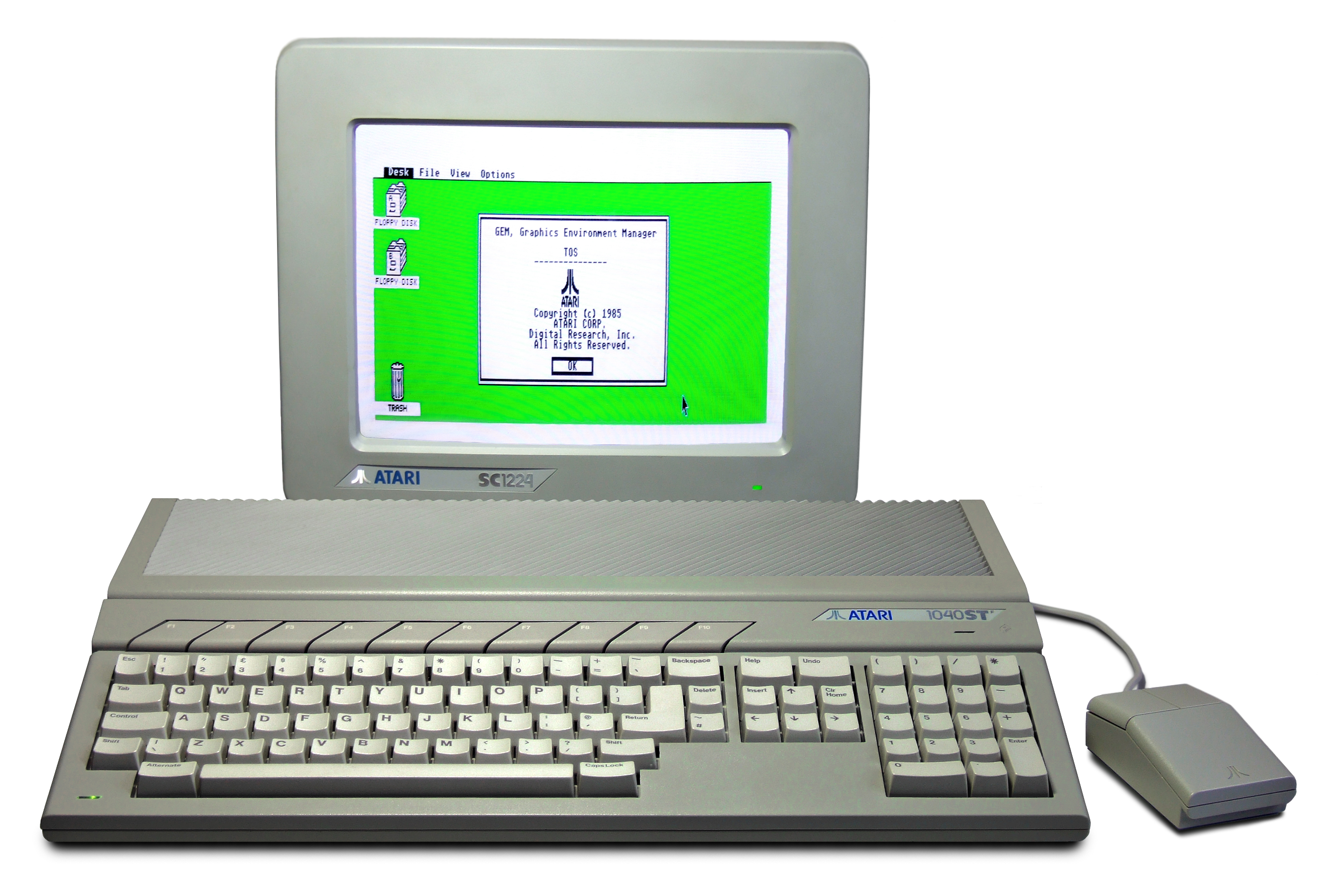
Atari ST (1985)

Under Tramiel's ownership, Atari Corp. used the remaining stock of game console inventory to keep the company afloat while it finished development on a 16/32-bit computer system, the Atari ST. ("ST" stands for "sixteen/thirty-two", referring to the machines' 16-bit bus and 32-bit processor core.) In April 1985, it released an update to the 8-bit computer line, the Atari 65XE, the first in the Atari XE series. June 1985 saw the release of the Atari 130XE; Atari User Groups received early sneak-preview samples of the new Atari 520ST's, and major retailer shipments hit store shelves in September 1985 of Atari's new 32-bit Atari ST computers. In 1986, Atari launched two consoles designed under Warner — the Atari 2600jr and the Atari 7800 console (which saw limited release in 1984). Atari rebounded, earning a $25 million profit that year.

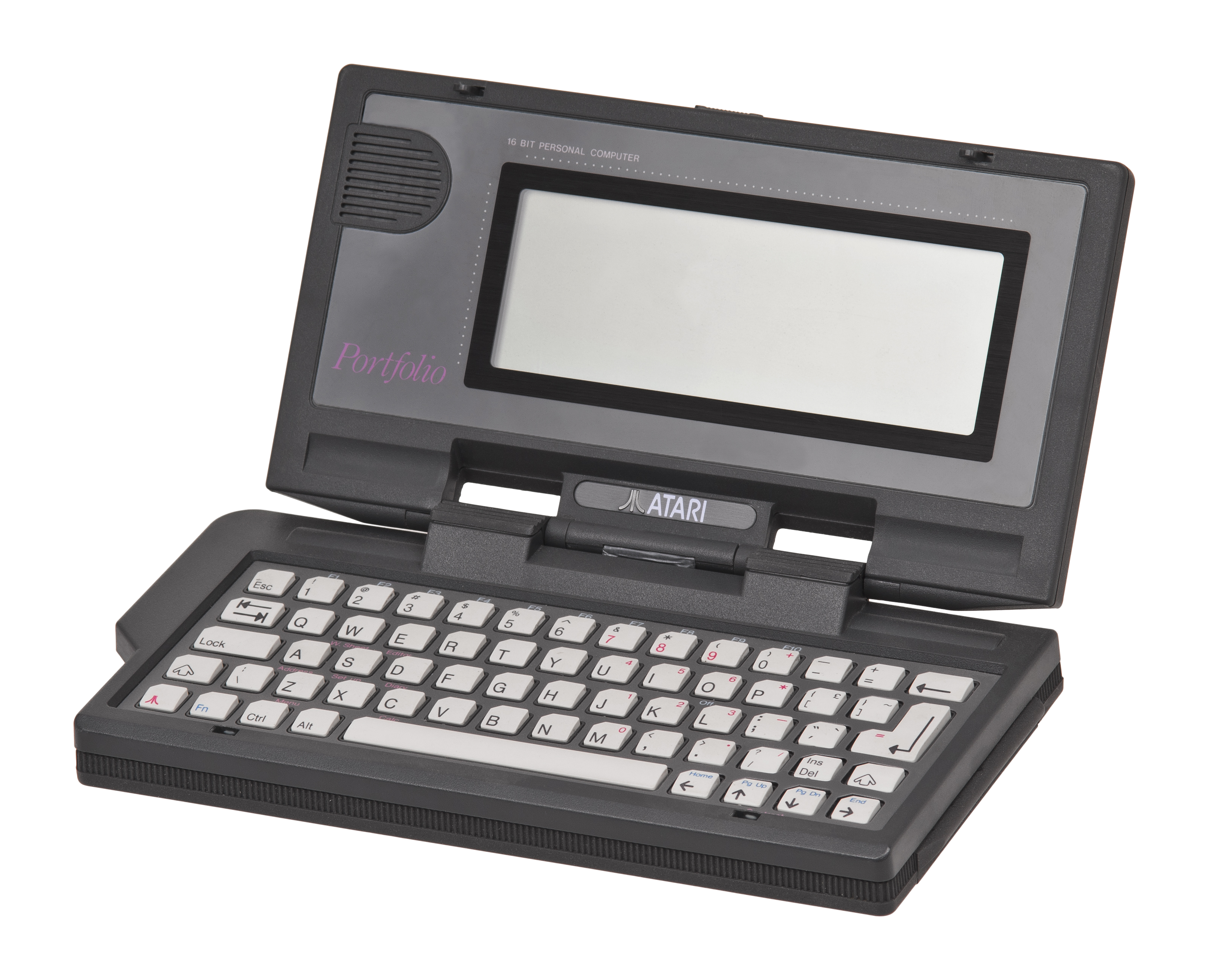
Atari Portfolio (1989)

In 1987, Atari acquired the Federated Group for $67.3 million, securing shelf space in over 60 stores in California, Arizona, Texas and Kansas at a time when major American electronics outlets were reluctant to carry Atari-branded computers, and two-thirds of Atari's PC production was sold in Europe. The Federated Group (not related to Federated Department Stores) was sold to Silo in 1989.

In 1988, the company unveiled the 1040STF and the Mega ST with a bit image manipulator chip, and launched its first parallel computer. The ATW-800 Transputer was based on the Inmos T800 CPU, which had a 32/64-bit architecture, ran at 15 million instructions per second (MIPS) and housed a Charity video chip that supported 16 million colors. The company continued to experiment with parallel computing aiming at B2B customers and graphic designers, but the transputer line failed to achieve commercial success.

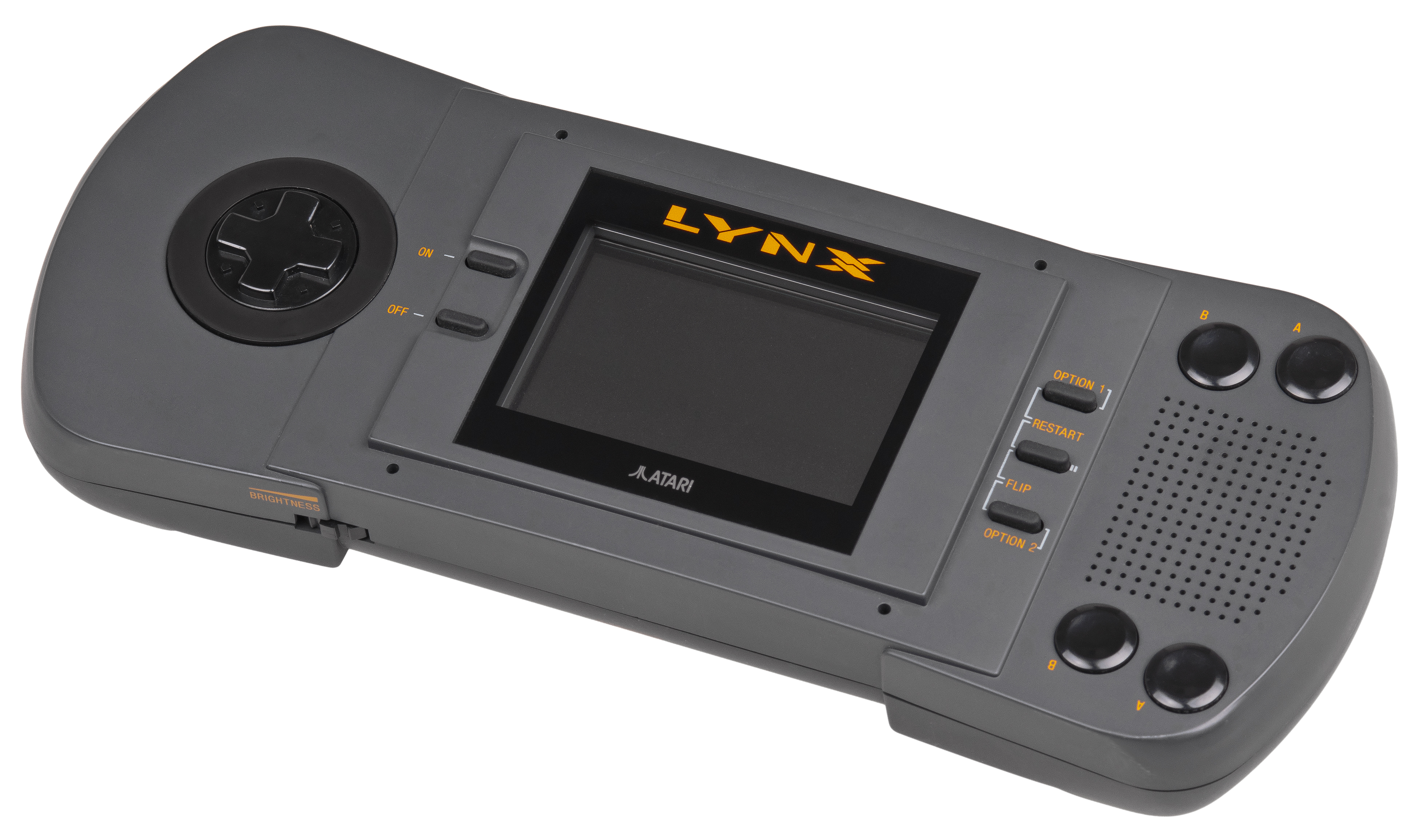
Atari Lynx (1989)

In 1989, Atari released the Atari Lynx, the first ever handheld console with a color display and a backlit screen, to much fanfare. A shortage of parts kept the system from being released nationwide for the 1989 Christmas season, and the Lynx lost market share to Nintendo's Game Boy, which, despite only having a black and white display, was cheaper, had better battery life and had much higher availability. Tramiel emphasized computers over game consoles, but Atari's proprietary computer architecture and operating system fell victim to the success of the Wintel platform while the game market revived. In 1989, Atari Corp. sued Nintendo for $250 million, alleging it had an illegal monopoly. Atari eventually lost the case when it was rejected by a US district court in 1992.

In 1991, Atari released its PCs ABC386SXII and ABC386DXII based on Intel's i386 chip.

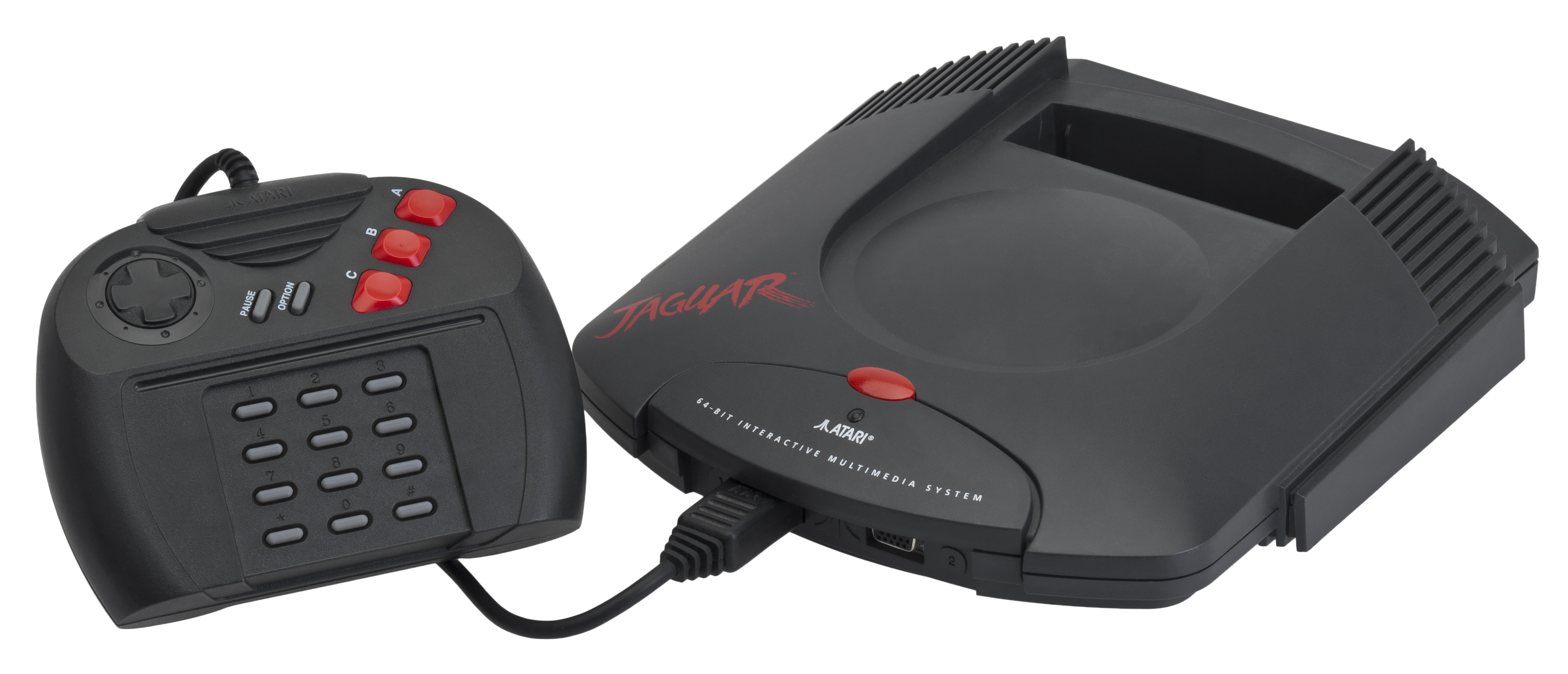
Atari Jaguar (1993)

In 1993, Atari positioned its Jaguar as the only 64-bit interactive media entertainment system available, but it sold poorly. It would be the last home console to be produced by Atari and the last to be produced by an American manufacturer until Microsoft's introduction of the Xbox in 2001.

By 1996, a series of successful lawsuits had left Atari with millions of dollars in the bank, but the failure of the Lynx and Jaguar left Atari without a product to sell. Tramiel and his family also wanted out of the business. The result was a rapid succession of changes in ownership. In July 1996, Atari merged with JTS Inc., a short-lived maker of hard disk drives, to form JTS Corp. Atari's role in the new company largely became that of holder for the Atari properties and minor support, and consequently the name largely disappeared from the market. Video game magazines reported it as Atari exiting the video game business.

The end of an era — Atari's story is one that certainly should never be forgotten by anyone who has ever enjoyed a videogame.

— from Next Generation magazine's special report on Atari, 1996

=== Atari Games Corporation (1985–1999) ===
After the asset sale to Tramel Technology, Atari was renamed Atari Games, Inc. In 1985, Warner established a new corporation called AT Games, Inc. with Namco, which purchased a controlling interest in the new venture. Warner then transferred the coin-operated games division of Atari Games, Inc. to AT Games, Inc., which renamed itself Atari Games Corporation. Warner renamed Atari Games, Inc. to Atari Holdings, which continued as a nonoperating subsidiary until 1992. In 1987, Namco sold 33% of its shares to a group of employees led by then-president Hideyuki Nakajima. He had been the president of Atari Games since 1985. Atari Ireland was a subsidiary of Atari Games that manufactured its games for the European market.

Atari Games continued to manufacture arcade games and units, and starting in 1988, also sold cartridges for the Nintendo Entertainment System under the Tengen brand name, including a version of Tetris. The companies exchanged a number of lawsuits in the late 1980s related to disputes over the rights to Tetris and Tengen's circumvention of Nintendo's lockout chip, which prevented third parties from creating unauthorized games. The suit finally reached a settlement in 1994, with Atari Games paying Nintendo cash damages and the use of several patent licenses.

In April 1996, after an unsuccessful bid by Atari cofounder Nolan Bushnell, the company was sold to WMS Industries, owners of the Williams, Bally, and Midway arcade brands, which restored the use of the Atari Games name. On November 19, 1999, Atari Games Corporation was renamed Midway Games West Inc., resulting in the Atari Games name no longer being used, with San Francisco Rush 2049 being the final Atari-branded arcade release.

=== Hasbro Interactive (1998–2000) ===
On March 13, 1998, JTS sold the Atari name and assets to Hasbro Interactive for $5 million. This transaction primarily involved the brand and intellectual property, which now fell under the Atari Interactive division of Hasbro Interactive. Two years after Atari's "death", the brand made a comeback with Hasbro immediately stating the development of new remakes of Atari classics, starting with Centipede released on Windows PCs later that year.

The brand name changed hands again in December 2000 when French software publisher Infogrames took over Hasbro Interactive.

=== Infogrames and Atari SA (2001–present) ===
Atari logo used by Atari SA from 2003 to 2009

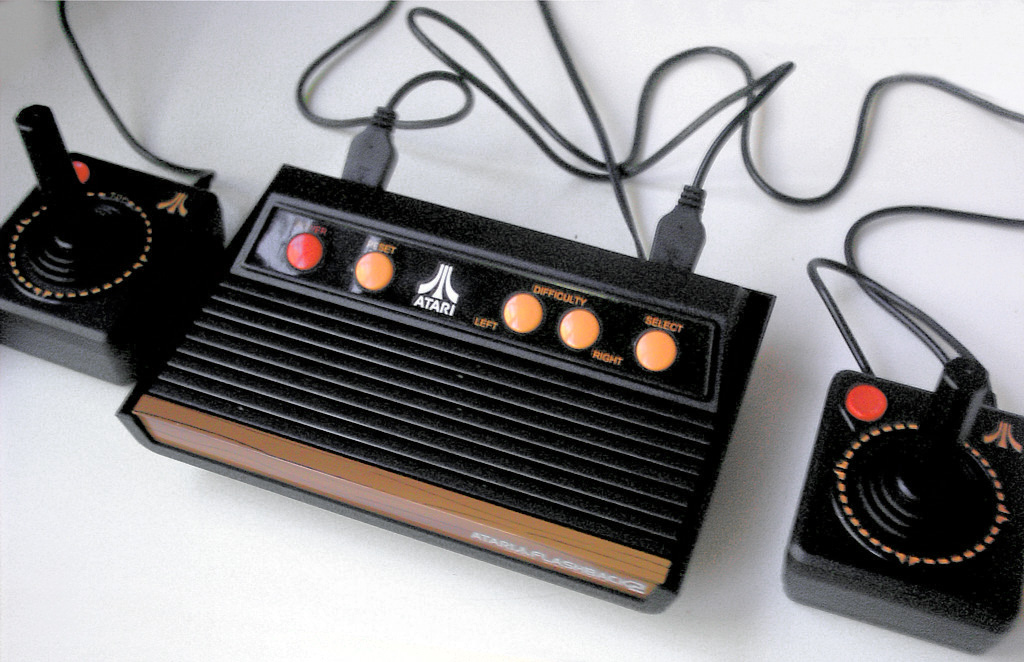
Atari Flashback 2

In October 2001, Infogrames Entertainment SA (IESA, now Atari SA) announced that it was "reinventing" the Atari brand with the launch of three new games featuring a prominent Atari branding on their boxarts: Splashdown, MX Rider and TransWorld Surf. Infogrames used Atari as a brand name for games aimed at 18–34 year olds. Other Infogrames games under the Atari name included V-Rally 3, Neverwinter Nights, Stuntman and Enter the Matrix.

On May 8, 2003, IESA had its majority-owned but discrete US subsidiary Infogrames, Inc. officially renamed Atari, Inc., renamed its European operations to Atari Europe but kept the original name of the main company Infogrames Entertainment. The original Atari holdings division purchased from Hasbro, originally Hasbro Interactive and later Infogrames Interactive, was renamed Atari Interactive.

==== Atari, Inc. buyout and name change to Atari SA ====
On March 6, 2008, IESA made an offer to Atari, Inc. to buy out all remaining public shares for a value of $1.68 per share, or $11 million total. The offer would make IESA sole owner of Atari, Inc., thus making it a privately held company. On April 30, 2008, Atari, Inc. announced its intentions to accept Infogrames' buyout offer and to merge with Infogrames. On October 8, 2008, IESA completed its acquisition of Atari, Inc., making it a wholly owned subsidiary.

On December 9, 2008, Atari announced that it had acquired Cryptic Studios, an MMORPG developer. Namco Bandai purchased a 34% stake in Atari Europe on May 14, 2009, paving the way for its acquisition from IESA. Atari had significant financial issues for several years prior, with losses in the tens of millions since 2005. In May 2009, Infogrames Entertainment SA, the parent company of Atari, and Atari Interactive, announced it would change its name to Atari SA. In April 2010, Atari SA board member and former CEO David Gardner resigned. Original Atari co-founder Nolan Bushnell joined the board as a representative for Blubay holdings. As of March 31, 2011, the board of directors consisted of Frank Dangeard, Jim Wilson, Tom Virden, Gene Davis and Alexandra Fichelson.

On January 21, 2013, the four related companies Atari, Atari Interactive, Humongous, and California US Holdings filed for Chapter 11 bankruptcy in the United States Bankruptcy Court for the Southern District of New York. All three Ataris emerged from bankruptcy one year later and the entering of the social casino gaming industry with Atari Casino. Frederic Chesnais, who now heads all three companies, stated that their entire operations consist of a staff of 10 people.

==== Chesnais era (2013–2021) ====
On June 22, 2014, Atari announced a new corporate strategy that would include a focus on "new audiences", specifically "LGBT, social casinos, real-money gambling, and YouTube".

On June 8, 2017, a short teaser video was released, promoting a new product; and the following week Chesnais confirmed the company was developing a new game console – the hardware was stated to be based on PC technology, and still under development. In mid July 2017 an Atari press release confirmed the existence of the aforementioned new hardware, referred to as the "Ataribox". The box design was derived from early Atari designs (e.g. 2600) with a ribbed top surface, and a rise at the back of the console; two versions were announced: one with a traditional wood veneer front, and the other with a glass front. Connectivity options were revealed, including HDMI, USB (x4), and SD card – the console was said to support both classic and current games. Also, according to an official company statement of June 22, 2017, the product was to be initially launched via a crowdfunding campaign in order to minimize any financial risk to the parent company.

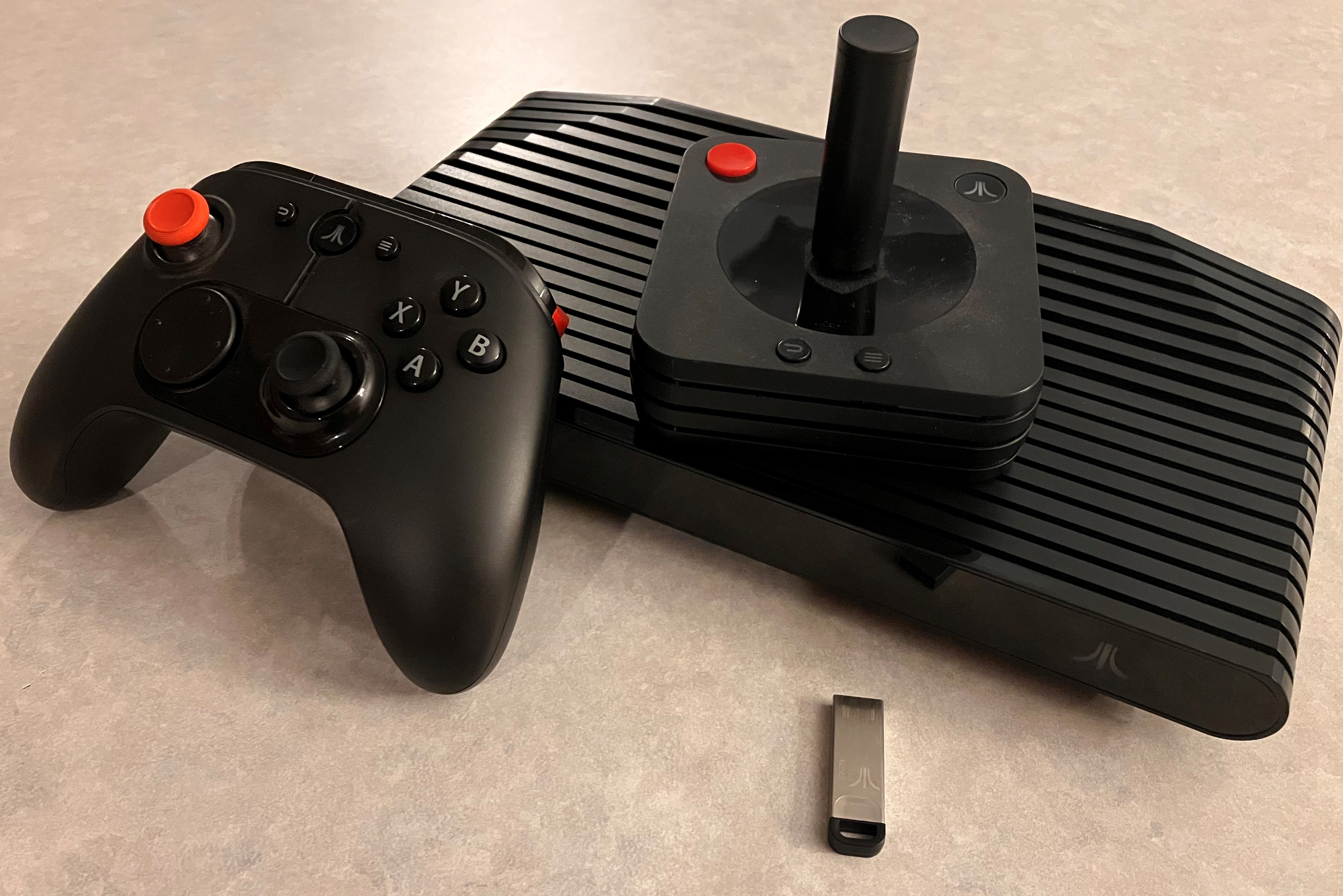
Atari VCS

On September 26, 2017, Atari sent out a press release about the new "Atari VCS", which confirmed more details about the console. It runs a Linux operating system, with full access to the underlying OS, but it has a custom interface designed for the TV.

On January 27, 2020, Atari announced a deal with GSD Group to build Atari Hotels, with the first breaking ground in Phoenix in mid-2020. Additional hotels were also planned in Las Vegas, Denver, Chicago, Austin, Seattle, San Francisco, and San Jose. The company plans to make the hotel experience immersive and accessible to all ages. Hotels are planned to include virtual and augmented reality technologies.

On December 16, 2020, Atari shipped the first units of the Atari VCS exclusive to backers of the systems crowdfunding campaign. Atari urged the backers to give feedback on the system so that the company could make changes to improve the product on its official launch. The consoles only ship to North America, Australia, and New Zealand.

In 2020, Atari launched its decentralized cryptocurrency Atari Token in equal partnership with the ICICB Group. Atari Group announced in March 2020 that it granted ICICB a non-exclusive license to run a cryptocurrency online casino on Atari's website, based on the Atari Token. The group partnering with Atari opened a new company in Gibraltar called Atari Chain LTD. In March 2021, Atari extended its partnership with ICICB Group for the development of Atari branded hotels, and the first hotels will be constructed at selected locations outside the United States, with Dubai, Gibraltar and Spain.

==== Rosen era (2021–present) ====
In late 2021, Wade Rosen became the new CEO of Atari. Unlike his predecessor, Rosen's strategy for Atari is a re-focus on retro gaming and Atari's classic franchises.

On 18 April 2022, Atari announced the termination of all license agreements with ICICB Group and its subsidiaries, including the Atari Chain Limited license and the related licenses including hotel and casino licenses, have been terminated effective 18 April 2022.

In March 2024, Atari announced that it will work with coin-op manufacturer Alan-1 to bring Atari Recharged titles to arcades. This marked the return of the Atari brand in the arcade space after 25 years, when San Francisco Rush 2049 was released.

== See also ==
- Golden age of arcade video games
- History of video games
- PlayStation
- Nintendo
- Xbox
- Sega
- SNK
