= Shovelware =

Poor-quality software collection

Shovelware is a type of video game or software bundle known more for the quantity of what is included than for its quality or usefulness.

The metaphor implies that the creators showed little care for the quality of the original software, as if the new compilation or version had been created by indiscriminately adding titles "by the shovel" in the same way someone would shovel bulk material into a pile. The term "shovelware" is coined by semantic analogy to phrases like shareware and freeware, which describe methods of software distribution. It first appeared in the early 1990s when large amounts of shareware demo programs were copied onto CD-ROMs and advertised in magazines or sold at computer flea markets.

== Shovelware CD-ROMs ==
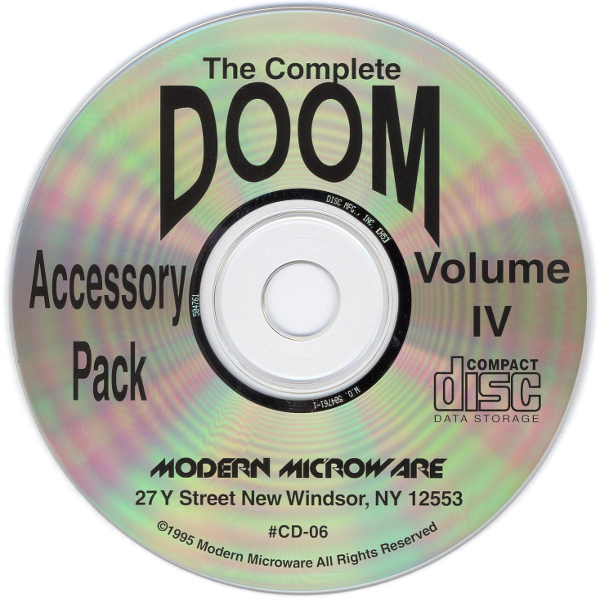
CD-ROM for The Complete Doom Accessory Pack Volume IV, a shovelware collection containing levels for Doom (1993) and Doom II (1994)

Computer Gaming World wrote in 1990 that for "those who do not wish to wait" for software that used the new CD-ROM format, The Software Toolworks and Access Software planned to release "game packs of several classic titles". By 1993 the magazine referred to software repackaged on CD-ROM as "shovelware", describing one collection from Access as having a "rather dusty menu" and another from The Software Toolworks ("the reigning king of software repackaging efforts") as including games that were "mostly mediocre even in their prime"; the one exception, Chessmaster 2000 (1986), used "stunning CGA graphics". In 1994 the magazine described shovelware as "old and/or weak programs shoveled onto a CD to turn a quick buck".

The capacity of a CD-ROM was 450–700 times that of the floppy disk, and 6–16 times larger than the hard disks with which personal computers were commonly outfitted in 1990. This outsized capacity meant that very few users would install the discs' entire contents, encouraging producers to fill them by including as much existing content as possible, often without regard to the quality of the material. Advertising the number of titles on the disc often took precedence over the quality of the content. Software reviewers, displeased with huge collections of inconsistent quality, dubbed this practice "shovelware" in the early 1990s. Additionally, some CD-ROM computer games had software that did not fill the disc to capacity, which enabled game companies to bundle demo versions of other products on the same disc.

The prevalence of this form of shovelware has decreased due to the practice of downloading individual programs from a crowdsourced or curated app store becoming the predominant mode of software distribution. It continues in some cases with bundled or pre-installed software, where many extra programs of dubious quality and functionality are included with a piece of hardware.

== Shovelware video games ==
Low-budget, poor-quality video games, released in the hopes of being purchased by unsuspecting customers, are often referred to as "shovelware". This can lead to discoverability issues when a platform has no type of quality control.

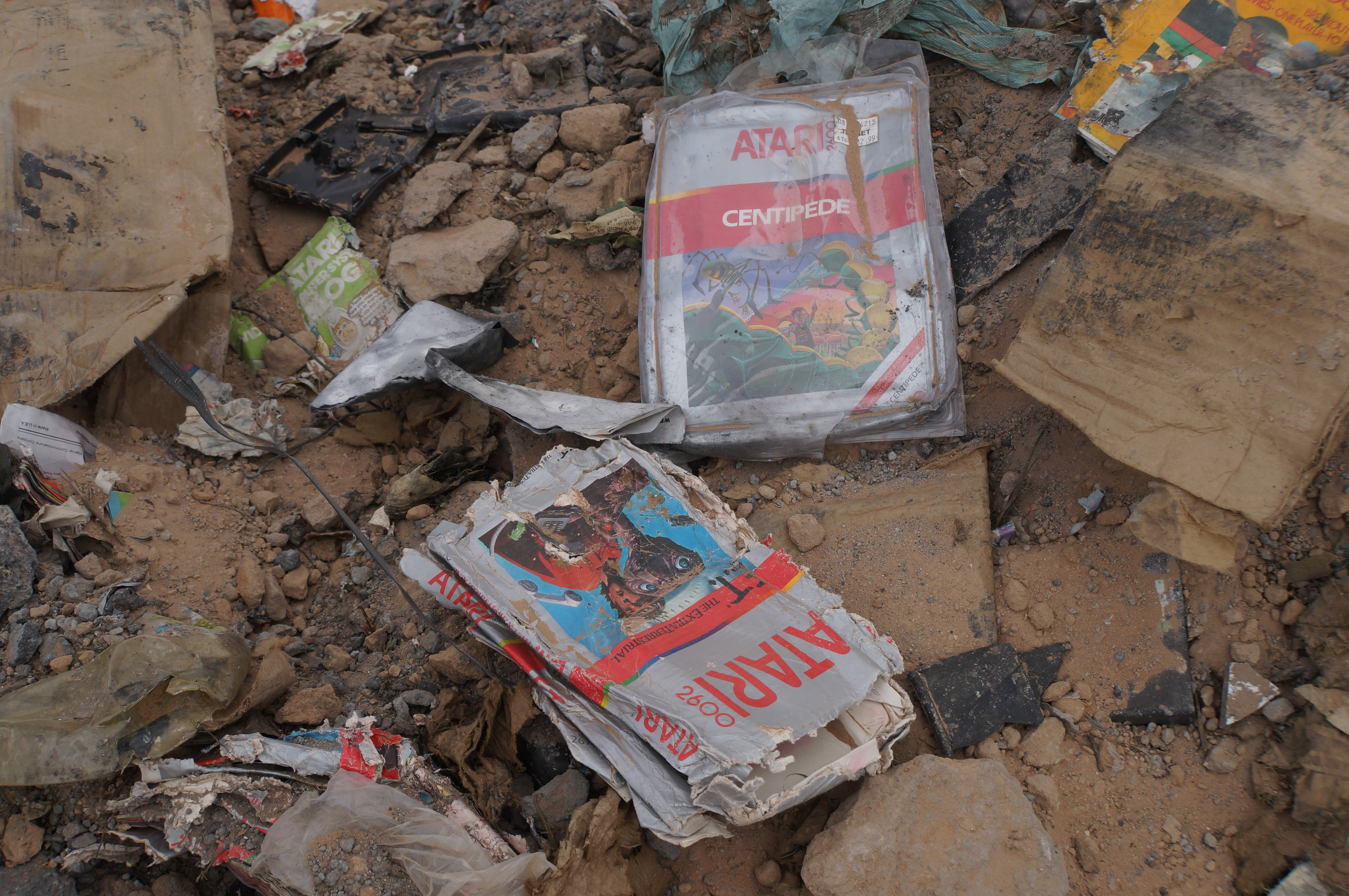
Landfill with the Atari 2600 games E.T. the Extra Terrestrial and Centipede. The quality of E.T. suffered greatly due to hardware limitations of the 2600, combined with a development of less than 6 weeks to produce cartridges in time for the 1982 Christmas shopping season. It was one of the biggest commercial failures in video game history, and is considered one of the worst video games of all time. A lack of quality control in video game publishing was a main cause of the video game crash of 1983 the next year. The crash led Atari to dump millions of unsold 2600 games into this landfill, in Alamogordo New Mexico. E.T. is considered one of the earliest examples of shovelware games, and the 2600 became notorious for third party shovelware.

Some developers and publishers have become well-known as creators of shovelware. Blast! Entertainment, a defunct video game developer and publisher, was known for releasing licensed shovelware games based on movies, television shows and books such as Beverly Hills Cop, Jumanji (both 2006), An American Tail, Little Britain, and Lassie (all 2007), the majority of which received negative reception. Another defunct European publisher, Phoenix Games, was known for its titles for the PlayStation 2, Wii, DS, and PC. A number of their in-house games are adaptations of low-budget animated mockbusters by Aqua Pacific and Dingo Pictures, which largely function as interactive "activity centre" games with minimal actual gameplay. Games made by other studios and published by Phoenix such as those by Mere Mortals have a similarly poor reputation. D3 Publisher, a Japanese video game publisher, was also known for releasing licensed shovelware games based on movies and TV shows, usually games based on Cartoon Network shows.

The Nintendo Wii became known for large amounts of shovelware, including ports of PlayStation 2 games which had previously only been released in Europe. Data Design Interactive became known for creating shovelware for the Wii. Their games Ninjabread Man, Anubis II, Rock 'n' Roll Adventures, and Myth Makers: Trixie in Toyland all used the same gameplay and level layouts, but changed the art and character design to make them appear to be unique properties. The eShop on Nintendo's later console, the Nintendo Switch, has also become notorious for featuring an abundance of low-quality games and software.

Asset flips are a subset of shovelware that largely or entirely use pre-made assets in order to release games en masse. Called fake games by Valve Corporation, 173 were removed from Steam in one 2017 purge that included several sock puppets of Silicon Echo Studios.

By 2025, shovelware games using generative AI, both for art assets and vibe coding, began appearing in various storefronts, leading to actions to remove these, such as with Sony.

== See also ==
- AI slop – Low-quality AI-generated digital content
- Freeware – Software distributed and used at no cost, with other rights still reserved
- Licensed games – Video games based on licensed properties, known to be of generally poor quality
- Potentially unwanted program – Software often described as unwanted
- Pre-installed software – Software already installed and licensed on a computer by OEM
- Product bundling – Offering several products as one
- Software bloat – Situation of degraded computer performance
- Video game crash of 1983 – 1983 US video gaming economic recession
