= List of video games notable for negative reception =

Certain video games often gain negative reception from reviewers perceiving them as having low-quality or outdated graphics, glitches, poor controls for gameplay, or irredeemable game design faults. Such games are identified through overall low review scores including low aggregate scores on sites such as Metacritic, frequent appearances on "worst games of all time" lists from various publications, or otherwise carrying a lasting reputation for low quality in analysis by video game journalists.

== Criteria ==
The list is not comprehensive, but represents the most prominent examples of games principally recognized for their enduring negative reception, or in the case of titles such as Final Fantasy XIV, No Man's Sky, Star Wars Battlefront II, and Cyberpunk 2077, at their original launch before they were reworked to be improved with content updates through patches. The list mostly omits licensed tie-in games for films or television shows, which are generally accepted by the industry as shovelware and not expected to have high production values as they are typically produced by non-AAA development studios. With certain exceptions, the list also omits controversial video games whose negative reception revolves around the controversies they started and is not related to the quality of the game itself, including those that were subject to review bombing by users for non-gameplay related issues. For similar reasons, the list mostly omits indie games, which are developed by smaller teams that typically lack the resources for full quality control of their product, as well as mobile gaming, of which there are countless developers with the ability to self-publish on app stores and frequent copycats of more successful games driven by unpopular microtransactions, as well as extensive use of stock game assets with little to no original artwork used.

Some games that are recognized as notably bad games are also those with poor sales which have impacted the developer and publisher of the games. These are included at List of commercial failures in video and arcade games, though not all games on that list are necessarily considered bad games.

== General classes ==
=== Kusoge ===
Kusoge is a Japanese term applied to video games, roughly translated as "crap game". It emerged in Japan in the mid-1980s in describing games such as Spelunker, Ikki, Takeshi's Challenge, and Hoshi Wo Miru Hito, games which were panned for bad gameplay design and difficulty. Despite this, such games may gain a type of cult status.

=== Movie tie-in games ===
Movie tie-in games are those developed and released to coincide with a major feature film release as part of the movie's larger marketing, similar to toys and other branded products. While the industry has had movie tie-in games as early as Raiders of the Lost Ark and E.T. the Extra-Terrestrial for the Atari 2600 in 1982, those that are generally seen as bad games were made in the 1990s and 2000s, during the period where video games could be rented from rental stores alongside the movies. In general, movie tie-in games during this period typically did not get large development budgets, so they were made by smaller studios under stricter time limits compared to most AAA games. Their design is also usually bound by specific terms in the licensing contract, such as what assets they can use, or what elements from the film's plot they must include. Developers were also limited by console technology of that time period. As such, most movie tie-in games are considered bad games with minimal innovation, often labeled as shovelware. As the cost of video game development increased in the mid-2000s, movie tie-ins started to wane, replaced with licensed games where the developers had time and flexibility to expand beyond just the film itself, and capable of taking advantage of better processing power offered by the sixth generation of video game consoles. Early examples representing this shift include Enter the Matrix (2003) and The Chronicles of Riddick: Escape from Butcher Bay (2004).

=== Asset flips ===
An asset flip is a type of shovelware in which a video game developer purchases pre-made assets and is perceived to use them to create numerous permutations of generic games to sell at low prices. The term asset flip was coined by games journalist James Stephanie Sterling around 2015. Such games tend to be viewed by gamers as uncreative, and as diverting attention from less popular high-quality titles. Asset flips have been noted to be a problem on many online distribution platforms, especially Steam. The Nintendo Switch eShop has also been accused of allowing the sale of asset flips.

== 1980s ==
=== Custer's Revenge (1982) ===
Custer's Revenge is an unlicensed Atari 2600 game made by American Multiple Industries in 1982, loosely based on 19th century American General George Armstrong Custer and the Battle of the Little Bighorn. In addition to being widely considered offensive due to its plot involving the apparent rape of a Native American woman, the game was also poorly received for its quality. It was listed as the most shameful game of all time by GameSpy, as the third-worst game of all time by PC World and GameTrailers, and the ninth-worst game by Seanbaby in Electronic Gaming Monthly.

In 2008, the University of Calgary professor Tom Keenan cited "the hideous Custer's Revenge game", 26 years after its release, in an op-ed piece about current video game violence issues for the Calgary Herald. That same year, the game was credited by Australian PC Magazine as being one of the worst games ever made. In response to the game's criticism, the makers of the game elected to preview the game for women's and Native American groups, an act which some thought was a publicity stunt.

=== Pac-Man, Atari 2600 (1982) ===
Pac-Man, a port of Namco's arcade game of the same name for the Atari 2600, was altered from the original in order to meet the 2600's limitations. Some of these changes included simplified graphics, a modified maze layout, and "flickering" ghosts—a result of the game rendering one ghost per frame on screen, due to the limitations of the Atari 2600 hardware. It was lambasted by critics upon release critical of the poor conversion from the arcade title. Later retrospectives considered it one of the worst products from this period of video games. Next Generation called it the "worst coin-op conversion of all time" in 1998 and attributed the mass dissatisfaction to its poor quality. In 2006, IGN's Craig Harris echoed similar statements and listed Pac-Man among his own list of the worst home console ports of arcade games. Another IGN editor, Levi Buchanan, described it as a "disastrous port", citing the color scheme and flickering ghosts.

Industry analysts often cite Atari's Pac-Man as a major factor in the drop of consumer confidence in the company, which partially contributed to the video game crash of 1983. Bill Loguidice and Matt Barton of Gamasutra stated that the game's poor quality damaged the company's reputation. Buchanan commented that it disappointed millions of fans and diminished confidence in Atari's games. Former Next Generation editor-in-chief Neil West attributes his longtime skepticism of Atari's quality to the disappointment he had from buying the game as a child. Calling the game the top video game disaster, Buchanan credits Pac-Man as a factor to the downfall of Atari and the industry in the 1980s. Author Steven L. Kent also attributes the game, along with E.T. the Extra-Terrestrial, to severely damaging the company's reputation and profitability. Video game industry researchers Nick Montfort and Ian Bogost stated that the game's negative reception seeded mistrust in retailers, which was reinforced by later factors that culminated in the crash.

While Pac-Man was the best-selling title on the Atari 2600, selling about 7.9 million units by the end of 1983, Atari reportedly had expected to sell up to nine million units. After being critically panned, Atari had to deal with the returns of a large volume of unsold games, some which ended up as part of the Atari video game burial in September 1983. On December 7, 1982, Ray Kassar announced that Atari's revenue forecasts for 1982 were cut from a 50 percent increase over 1981 to a 15 percent increase. Following the announcement, then Atari parent Warner Communications' stock value dropped by around 35 percent—from $54 to $35—amounting to a loss of $1.3 billion in the company's market valuation. Atari attempted to regain its market share by licensing popular arcade games for its consoles. The revenue from selling these console games did not reverse Atari's decline and the company went further into debt. Atari ultimately reported a $536 million loss in 1983, and Warner Communications sold off the company's consumer division in 1984 to former Commodore International chief Jack Tramiel.

=== E.T. the Extra-Terrestrial (1982) ===
E.T. the Extra-Terrestrial received significant criticism for its low-quality graphics and redundant and confusing gameplay.

E.T. the Extra-Terrestrial for the Atari 2600 is loosely based on Steven Spielberg's 1982 film of the same name, reputedly coded in just five weeks to be released in time for the 1982 holiday season. The game sold 1.5 million copies and came nowhere near Atari's expectations of five million units. On top of that, a large number of the cartridges sold were sent back to the company, because many consumers found the game to be unenjoyable. Truckloads of these cartridges were buried in a landfill in New Mexico after they failed to sell. E.T. is commonly cited, alongside Pac-Man for the Atari 2600, as the catalyst for a crash of the video game industry in 1983, as Atari had hoped that brand loyalty would help keep consumers buying their games regardless of quality.

E.T. was universally panned by critics, with nearly every aspect of the game facing heavy criticism. Common complaints were focused on the plot, gameplay, and visuals. It was listed as the worst game of all time by PC World in 2006, Electronic Gaming Monthly, and FHM magazine, and was ranked as the second worst movie game on the "Top Ten Worst Movie Games" (first being Charlie's Angels) by GameTrailers. It was also ranked the second-worst game of all time by GameTrailers; the title for absolute worst went to Superman 64. Some considered it so bad that they singled out the title screen as being the only good part of the game. In 2007, GamePro named E.T. one of the 52 most important games of all time due to its roles in the 1983 video game crash and the downfall of the seemingly unstoppable Atari. It is the only game to make the list for having a negative impact on the video game industry.

=== Cassette 50 (1983) ===
Cassette 50 is a compilation of games, originally developed in 1983 by British studio Cascade Games, with different versions released for various 8-bit home computers. Most of the games were developed by Guy Wilhelmy, although some were developed by other authors who responded to anonymous ads in newspapers. These authors submitted their games while agreeing to give up all their rights to them, in return being paid between £10 and £20. In some cases, these developers were not even aware of the subsequent presence of their work on Cassette 50. The compilation became well known in the 1980s microcomputer scene for its aggressive advertising presence in video game magazines from 1983 to 1987. The game was available via mail-in order, and was often bundled with cheap watches or calculators in order to further encourage purchases. Despite providing advertising space to Cassette 50 for five years, none of the magazines ever actually reviewed the game.

The games were written in the BASIC programming language, owing to its simplicity and ease of porting between multiple systems. The compilation became infamous for the extremely poor quality of many of the included titles, with some being borderline unplayable, and others being copies of already existing games, including very old titles such as the 1971 Star Trek video game. Examples of barely functional games include Basketball, a two player game of basketball which cannot be played properly as the computer will only ever register one set of input at a time; Alien Attack, requiring the player to almost totally blindly guess which key to press on the number pad to shoot down an incoming alien ship; and Maze Eater, a Pac-Man clone played at an extremely low speed and with non-functional enemy AI. The poor quality of the graphics and sound effects was also the subject of criticism, and while a few titles in the compilations did receive some praise, the vast majority of them were deemed to be "legendarily awful".

In a later interview, Guy Wilhelmy admitted that the compilation's format ensured a "quantity over quality" approach, with very little work being done on each game due to there being so many of them. Despite the game's very poor quality, it was a commercial success thanks to the ubiquitous advertisement which ensured a steady supply of revenue for Cascade Games, which they used to develop several different games in the 1980s, until the company closed in 1990. In most retrospective analysis, Cassette 50 is generally considered to be one of the worst games ever created for the ZX Spectrum and other microcomputers of the 1980s. The poor quality of the games ended up inspiring the annual Crap Games Competitions starting from 2007, which are still ongoing to this day.

=== Dr. Jekyll and Mr. Hyde (1988) ===
Dr. Jekyll and Mr. Hyde is a 1988 side-scrolling action video game developed by Advance Communications and published by Bandai for the Nintendo Entertainment System (NES) loosely based on Robert Louis Stevenson's 1886 novella Strange Case of Dr Jekyll and Mr Hyde. Gameplay alternates between the characters of Dr. Jekyll and Mr. Hyde based on the player's ability to either avoid or cause damage. While getting decent reviews when released, the game gained largely negative retrospective reviews, with reviewers criticizing bad graphics, confusing gameplay, and poor use of the characters and setting.

Darrell Monti of Nintendo Life called it one of the worst games he got for the NES. In 2004, Game Informer reviewed the game in their Retro Reviews section and gave it a 0.5 out of 10, ending the review by saying "Flawed on every fundamental level, Dr. Jekyll and Mr. Hyde is possibly the most unplayable garbage available on the NES." In 2018, the German branch of Eurogamer placed the game at number eight on their list of top ten worst games of the 1980s. The writers complain that nothing is explained to the player and that some characters harm the players, but some do not. They called it a frustrating and confusing experience and said: "Dr. Jekyll and Mr. Hyde should be played by anyone who wants to learn more about good game design [...] because this title makes everything so perfectly wrong that you could almost think it was deliberately designed that way." The game was the first to be reviewed on the website Something Awful, gaining a score of −37 on a 0 to −50 scale, with −50 being the worst possible score. Brett Alan Weiss of AllGame declared that the "music and graphics are tolerable, but the controls are sluggish and the action is exceedingly dull, rendering Dr. Jekyll and Mr. Hyde almost unplayable".

== 1990s ==
=== Action 52 (1992) ===
Action 52 is an unlicensed multicart developed by Active Enterprises for the Nintendo Entertainment System in 1992. It contains 52 original games covering various genres, from shoot 'em ups to platformers. Action 52 is one of the most infamous NES games for a number of reasons. The game originally retailed for over US$199 (which equates to about four dollars for each game, and is equivalent to ~US$450 today). Many of its games have poor controls and graphics, and are plagued by bizarre glitches and technical problems, with some games being impossible to complete and others that will not load. Kill Screen described all the games as "shit", and Atari HQ called it "really, horribly, incredibly bad." The game frequently appears on lists compiling the worst games ever, and Atari HQ called it the worst game of all time. GameSpy named it the fifth most shameful game ever, summarizing it as an "endless parade of inept programming, repetitive design and outright stupidity." A drastically different version of the game was also developed by FarSight Studios for the Sega Genesis; Hardcore Gaming 101 wrote it was better than the NES version, but "that really isn't saying much."

=== Night Trap (1992) ===
Night Trap is an interactive movie video game originally published by Sega for the Sega CD in 1992. It was the first interactive movie released for the system and had initially received mixed reviews. Critics praised its smooth video animation and humor, but disliked its shallow gameplay. The game became infamous after it was scrutinized during the 1993–94 United States Senate hearings on video games, in which Senator Joe Lieberman claimed Night Trap featured gratuitous violence and promoted sexual aggression against women. The game was removed from store shelves in the United States' two largest toy store chains, Toys "R" Us and KB Toys, after both received numerous complaints. After the controversy subsided, Night Trap was ported to multiple platforms, such as the 32X and 3DO. These ports were reviewed more harshly; critics felt the game had not aged well and considered its gameplay dull. Next Generation gave the 32X version a one-star rating and GameFan called it a "so-so game that got a lot more attention than it deserved." Retrospectively, Night Trap was ranked one of the worst video games of all time by Electronic Gaming Monthly, GamesRadar, and Computer Gaming World. A remastered version of the game was released in April 2017 for the PlayStation 4, and later in August 2017 for the Nintendo Switch. These ports were rated "T" for "Teen", a lower rating than the original "M" for "Mature" it was given upon its initial release.

=== Plumbers Don't Wear Ties (1993) ===
Plumbers Don't Wear Ties was released in 1993 for MS-DOS with a limited number of copies, along with the 3DO version one year later. It was advertised as being an interactive, full-motion video game; besides an opening cutscene, the game's story is presented through static images. The game received negative attention focused on its "surreal" and "sexist" storyline, and poor voice acting. Uproxx's Dan Seitz compared Plumbers Don't Wear Ties to a "Skinemax" movie, and felt that its constant use of still images was the "single saddest attempt to simulate a dream sequence ever". IGN felt that Plumbers Don't Wear Ties was "a symbol for everything that was wrong" with the 3DO's looser licensing program in comparison to the other major consoles (which required publishers to pay a $3 fee per disc), noting that it helped to attract smaller studios whose games "served to strengthen the perception that 3DO's library was riddled with crap", and cited the game as one of the primary reasons for the commercial failure of the 3DO game system. PC Gamer dubbed Plumbers Don't Wear Ties a "shallow, hateful waste of a game, [that] may very well be responsible for having killed the 3DO, interactive fiction, and the whale", naming it number one on its "Must NOT Buy" list in May 2007. A re-release of the game by Limited Run Games for Nintendo Switch, PlayStation 4, PlayStation 5, and Microsoft Windows was announced at E3 2021, and released in March 2024.

=== Philips CD-i The Legend of Zelda releases (1993–1994) ===
Before the canceled plans to release a CD-ROM add-on for the Super Nintendo Entertainment System (SNES), Nintendo granted Philips licenses to use some of their major characters in games for their CD-i system. In addition to Hotel Mario, Philips released three games in The Legend of Zelda franchise: Link: The Faces of Evil; Zelda: The Wand of Gamelon (both 1993); and Zelda's Adventure (1994), all produced with limited involvement from Nintendo. Due to this nature, the games are considered as non-canon to the Zelda franchise, according to series producer Eiji Aonuma.

The first two games, Faces of Evil and Wand of Gamelon, were developed in tandem by Animation Magic (a Russian-American animation company), using the same game engine, and were released on the same day. Both are side-scrollers where the player has to fight enemies and collect treasure to access certain levels. When first released, the games received some positive reviews; critical re-assessment from the 2000s onward has been largely negative. The two games gained notoriety in that decade when attention was brought to their animated cutscenes, which were developed by Animation Magic's Russian studio; in the midst of a review of The Legend of Zelda animated series, an IGN reviewer described the games as being "infamous" and Matthew Castle of Computer and Video Games considered the cutscenes to be "terrifying, rendering Link as a rubbery limbed freak with a face that swims all over his head".

Further criticism was brought to Zelda's Adventure, a third game developed instead by Viridis, which used a top-down approach and shifted to a live-action visual style with digitized sprites instead of a cartoon look. According to Castle, "what [Zelda's Adventure] lacked in hideous toons it made up for with live-action FMV-visits from a beardy wizard (not a professional actor, but the game's music composer) whose shambolic preamble makes Knightmare look like The Lord of the Rings." It also suffered from poor gameplay, and a glitch preventing the game from playing both music and sound effects at the same time.

Beyond the cutscenes (which soon became popular Internet memes alongside Hotel Mario), reviewers at GameTrailers have also ascribed modern negative criticism to "barely functional controls, lackluster gameplay, and numerous bugs". Danny Cowan of 1UP.com noted that Zelda fans "almost universally despise these games". The Wand of Gamelon was ranked the sixth-worst video game of all time by Electronic Gaming Monthly and the fifth-worst by GameTrailers.

=== Hotel Mario (1994) ===
Philips' deal with Nintendo for the three The Legend of Zelda games also gave them the rights to use characters from the Mario series. The company commissioned several games featuring Mario to be made for the CD-i; only one, Hotel Mario, was released. A puzzle game, Hotel Mario features animated cutscenes produced by Ocatillo Pictures. The game received primarily mixed reviews upon release; GamePro called the game fun to play, but believed it would bore players and would only appeal to core Mario fans.

Retrospective reviews of the game have been negative, with the game facing criticism for unresponsive controls, the gameplay of closing doors, and the animation and voice acting of the cutscenes. IGN, while claiming that Hotel Mario was better than the Zelda CD-i games, slammed the game for being "dull", stating that there was "no reason" for anyone to play it. GamesRadar referred to Hotel Mario as "craptastic" and named it the 48th worst game of all time, while The Guardian called Hotel Mario a "horrible attempt to cash in on the full-motion-video capabilities of the useless CD-i console". Eurogamer claimed the game to be "little more than a really rubbish version of Elevator Action". The game's cutscenes have been subject to much ridicule and many Internet memes; IGN compared their quality to that of Microsoft Paint.

=== Shaq Fu (1994) ===
Shaq Fu, a fighting game starring American basketball player Shaquille O'Neal, received mixed reviews by critics upon its release, who praised the game's graphical style, smooth animations, and robust gameplay, but criticized its low difficulty and small character sprites, and also questioned the relevance of O'Neal's presence in the game. Allgame was similarly critical of the game, criticizing its "sluggish" controls, the quality of the in-game sprites making O'Neal "nearly unrecognizable", and a "shallow" story mode with "cheesy" dialogue. Despite these mixed reviews, Shaq Fu has remained "collectively detested" by critics and gamers, and a website also exists that is solely dedicated to the location and destruction of every copy of Shaq Fu.

Levi Buchanan of IGN argued that Shaq Fu had received ridicule from contemporary critics because of its connections to the phenomena surrounding O'Neal, explaining that "[his] ego had reached such critical mass that it developed its own gravitational pull. And when an ego gets that large, the people that fed the ego to begin with love to turn on it." Buchanan acknowledged some positive aspects of Shaq Fu, such as its graphics and animation, its non-linear story progression, and its "charming" simplicity in comparison to other major fighting game franchises such as Soul and Virtua Fighter, but that it had a "goofy" story and "awful" cast. A sequel, Shaq Fu: A Legend Reborn, was released on June 5, 2018, to an even more negative critical reception than the original.

=== Bubsy 3D (1996) ===
Bubsy 3D, a platform game in the Bubsy series for the PlayStation, was negatively received due to its disorienting camera, poor graphics, sluggish controls, and the titular character's voice clips. Upon release Sushi-X of Electronic Gaming Monthly declared it "my first coaster award", and remarked, "Pretend your controller is filled with mud—this is how Bubsy plays." GamesRadar named it as the video game equivalent to poorly-received films such as Plan 9 from Outer Space and Battlefield Earth. GameTrailers named it their eighth worst video game ever made and referred to it as a rip-off of Super Mario 64, which released nearly 2 months prior. Internet reviewer Seanbaby named it his 17th worst game of all time, criticizing its controls, the character's personality and the graphics. Bubsy series creator Michael Berlyn cited the game as his biggest failure.

=== Superman 64 (1999) ===
Based on Superman: The Animated Series, Titus Interactive's Superman: The New Superman Adventures for the Nintendo 64 (often referred to as Superman 64) has the player control Superman as he is challenged by his nemesis Lex Luthor to help save the people of Metropolis. Upon release, the game was heavily panned for its repetitive nature, difficult and confusing objectives, poor controls, numerous glitches that interfere with the gameplay, and poor graphics. Notoriously, the game has an introductory ring maze sequence that the player is given no warning about, with the sequence having a time limit that leaves very little or no room for error. The ring maze section was further exacerbated by the extremely short draw distances covered by distance fog, which is explained in-game as being an aspect of the virtual reality simulation of Metropolis the game is set in, but was previously described as "Kryptonite fog" by developers. Titus was harshly criticized for the poor quality of the game. Titus stated that while they had grander plans for the game, "the licensor killed us", and the final game only represents about 10% of what they wanted to include.

Superman was listed as the worst game of all time by GameTrailers, the worst game on a Nintendo platform by Nintendo Power, and as the worst video game adaptation of a comic book by both GameSpy and GameDaily.

== 2000s ==
=== Mortal Kombat: Special Forces (2000) ===
Mortal Kombat: Special Forces is the second action game in the Mortal Kombat franchise released for the PlayStation in 2000 following Mortal Kombat Mythologies: Sub-Zero. It has received worse reviews than Mythologies, and has an average review score of only 28/100 at Metacritic (which the site characterizes as "generally unfavorable reviews"), including ratings of 2.1/10 from GameSpot and 3/10 from IGN.

Of all the Mortal Kombat games, Special Forces is considered by some to be the worst. Its sales were so low that Midway placed the series on hold in preparation for Mortal Kombat: Deadly Alliance (2002). Ed Boon stated: "The game had a pretty bumpy development ride and the game didn't turn out very good at all." In 2011, GamesRadar ranked it as the second most absurd Mortal Kombat offshoot (behind Mortal Kombat: Live Tour). In 2013, GamesRadar also ranked it as the 41st worst game made.

Conversely, some of the reviews have been more positive. Video Games: The Ultimate Guide gave the game 7 out of 10 and The Electric Playground gave it 7 out of 10.

=== The Simpsons Wrestling (2001) ===
The Simpsons Wrestling is a sports game based on the animated television series The Simpsons. The game was made for the PlayStation console, was developed by Big Ape Productions, published by Electronic Arts in Europe and Activision in North America and distributed by Fox Interactive. The Simpsons Wrestling received widespread negative reviews from critics; primary criticisms for the game were directed at its simplistic, unbalanced gameplay and bad graphics. It holds an aggregated score of 41.21% on GameRankings and 32/100 on Metacritic. IGN gave the game a 1 out of 10, and declared it "the most horrific demolition of a license ever".

=== Mortal Kombat Advance (2001) ===
A port of Ultimate Mortal Kombat 3 for the Game Boy Advance, Mortal Kombat Advance was based on the SNES port of the game. Midway Games handed development of the title to Virtucraft, a short-lived and little-known company that mostly handled ports of established properties to portable devices. They were tasked with porting the game in only two months. This abbreviated development cycle, the lower quality of the original SNES port, and the Game Boy Advance having two fewer buttons than the game required all seriously harmed the game's playability: the release has an aggregated score of 33/100 on Metacritic, and was notable for receiving extremely low scores in Electronic Gaming Monthly, of 0.0 (the first in the magazine's history, given by editor Dan Hsu), 1.5, and 0.5 out of 10. Mortal Kombat Advance is considered one of the series' worst games, with IGN calling it "an absolute embarrassment to the Mortal Kombat franchise."

=== Batman: Dark Tomorrow (2003) ===
Based on the DC Comics character Batman, Batman: Dark Tomorrow received very negative reviews from critics for its confusing gameplay, repetitive mission modes and awkward camera angles. The end of the game was also criticized because there is no direction to the "fulfilling ending" of the story beside using an outside game guide. GameSpot gave the game a score of 2.8 out of 10, while IGN gave it a score of 2.2 out of 10 for the Xbox version and 3.5 out of 10 for the GameCube version. GameRankings gave it a score of 24.06% for the Xbox version and 27.83% for the GameCube version; while Metacritic gave it a score of 25 out of 100 for the Xbox version and 29 out of 100 for the GameCube version. A PlayStation 2 version was planned, but was cancelled due to the game's poor reception. In 2015, GamesRadar named Dark Tomorrow the 18th worst game, claiming the game's camera "makes Epic Mickey's look like cinematography genius".

=== Tomb Raider: The Angel of Darkness (2003) ===
Tomb Raider: The Angel of Darkness, the sixth installment in the Tomb Raider series, which acted as a direct sequel to Tomb Raider: The Last Revelation (1999), and Tomb Raider: Chronicles (2000), received mixed to negative reviews for its poor controls, gameplay, and various bugs, although the graphics and original soundtrack were praised. IGN's Douglas C. Perry praised its "compelling storyline" and "set of intriguing bit characters", but criticized the game stating that those aspects of the game "pale in comparison to 90% of the PlayStation 2's adventure or action-adventure games, and they actually hurt the rest of the game's best qualities", but that the new moves worked smoothly apart from the stealth actions. He also added multiple examples of good level design, smooth character models, surface textures and lightning, while feeling more mixed about Lara's unrealistic figure and hardened appearance.

GameRevolution's A. A. White stated that while the game's darker story was an improvement compared to its predecessors, it never "[managed] to build to a captivating crescendo", while the reviewer for GamesRadar called it "bountiful but confusing and ultimately of GCSE-standard creative writing." Eurogamer called the controls dated and the stealth mechanics and strength upgrade system unnecessary, while the GamesRadar reviewer cited both the gameplay and control layout as dated, citing the difficulty of effectively controlling Lara at multiple points in the game because of these issues. The camera was also criticized, with gaming outlets citing it as awkward to control and sometimes wayward or confusing during its scripted movements. (Note: Attributed to multiple sources:)

In 2010, GameTrailers placed the game 5th in their "Top 10 Worst Sequels" list. The Angel of Darkness caused multiple problems for the Tomb Raider franchise. Paramount Pictures faulted Lara Croft: Tomb Raider – The Cradle of Life's lackluster box office performance on the poor critical reception the video game received from reviewers and fans. The head of Core Design, Jeremy Heath-Smith, resigned after the release of the game, and plans for a sequel called The Lost Dominion, part of a proposed trilogy created using the game's engine, were scrapped. Following the poor performance of both the game and the second movie, Eidos Interactive took the production of Tomb Raider games away from Core Design and assigned them to Crystal Dynamics, noted as the developers of the Legacy of Kain series starting with Legend.

=== Drake of the 99 Dragons (2003) ===
Drake of the 99 Dragons holds an aggregate score of 22 on Metacritic, ranking it as the second-worst game for the original Xbox. In 2009, the game was placed as the eleventh worst received game in the last 15 years by GamesRadar. GameSpot's Alex Navarro felt that the game was a "cacophony of terrible effects and voice acting"—noticing the re-use of stock sounds used in AOL Instant Messenger, and comparing the character's voice to a cross between a game show host and the "Moviefone guy". He also felt that due to the game's "disjointed" cutscenes and narration, the storyline was difficult to understand.

IGN's Aaron Boulding gave the game a 2.9 out of 10; while praising the game's unique visual appearance and presentation, along with the "bullet time" audio effects while slowing down time, he concluded that Drake of the 99 Dragons was "a good idea that went horribly astray and ended up disastrous" and that "there's no need to rent, purchase or entertain the thought of playing this one." GameSpot gave the game a lower score of 1.6, considering it "an out-and-out failure in every single discernable category." The game was rereleased on Steam in 2018, prompting Luke Winkie of PC Gamer to publish a retrospective review, in which he, while discommending the game overall, argued it to be a nostalgic, enjoyable experience despite its overall poor quality as a product.

=== Big Rigs: Over the Road Racing (2003) ===
Big Rigs: Over the Road Racing is a racing game developed by Stellar Stone and published by GameMill Publishing, where the player competes in road races with semi-trailer trucks. Big Rigs was released in a pre-alpha state, and it lacks any type of collision detection, allowing players to drive through other vehicles and obstacles, while its physics system is so problematic that it allows players to drive up a vertical incline or accelerate to a maximum speed of 1.23×10^{37} mph (equivalent to 18 undecillion times the speed of light) while driving in reverse before a floating-point arithmetic overflow occurs, coming to an immediate halt once the accelerator is released. The launch version lacks computer artificial intelligence, meaning computer-controlled vehicles do not move at all during the race, thus making the game impossible to lose. A patch was released in an attempt to solve the last problem, but it only enabled computer-controlled vehicles to race until they reached the finish line, where they simply stopped without crossing it. It also has a number of grammatical and typographical errors, most notably the message to the player on finishing a race, "YOU'RE WINNER !"

Big Rigs was listed as one of the worst games ever made by GameSpot and Computer and Video Games. After declaring it the "worst game ever made" in a "Games You Should Never Buy" segment, X-Play's Morgan Webb refused to rate Big Rigs as their scale went from only 1 to 5. On aggregate reviews, it has the lowest aggregate score of any video game, with a 6/100 on Metacritic, and 3.83% on GameRankings. Big Rigs was split from another game, Midnight Race Club, by GameMill Publishing, which had initially sought to release just one racing game stock keeping unit.

The game was re-released on videogame distribution platform Steam in April of 2025, adding leaderboard support and Steam achievements through a new external launcher application. Announced on April Fool's Day of that year, the marketing for this re-release capitalised on the game's poor reputation; the release trailer drew attention to the game's more infamous elements as well as the game's very low Metacritic score.

=== The Guy Game (2004) ===
The Guy Game is presented in a trivia quiz show format complemented with filmed live-action footage of young women in bikinis on spring break, many of whom would flash their breasts. Its development was led by former Metroid Prime developer Jeff Spangenberg, who sought to create an interactive game with appeal to men inspired by the Girls Gone Wild series of pornographic videos. The objective of The Guy Game is for players to earn points, as well as accumulate bonus points for a meter, titled the Flash-O-Meter, that progressively removes censorship of footage of the women exposing their breasts. The game was both a commercial and critical failure, with many critics lambasting it on the grounds of crassness, slow pace and lack of content. It was subjected to controversy after one of the participants sued the developers Topheavy Studios and publishers as she was revealed to have been underaged at the time of filming. This led to the game being pulled from shelves. In 2015, The Guardian cited The Guy Game as one of the worst games of all time, describing it as a "salacious" and "misogynist" title overshadowed by the circumstances of its censorship. In 2016, Stace Harman of IGN described it as a "lackluster trivia game" with "inane" humor.

=== Lula 3D (2005) ===
The adult adventure game Lula 3D was criticized for its monotonous gameplay, poor puzzle designs, low-quality graphics (including animations, an inconsistent frame rate, and re-use of character models), its voice acting, the quality of its English translation, and low-brow humor that was too childish for its target audience. On Metacritic, the game received an aggregate score of 28% from 14 reviews. In 2013, Polygon cited Lula 3D and other "low-brow" pornographic games as a factor in the mainstream video game industry's general non-acceptance of adult video games. In 2017, GamesRadar+ ranked Lula 3D as the 44th worst game of all time, arguing that "the game's lack of fun is rivalled only by its lack of respectable clothing", and stating that in one part of the game, trying to move the character with both the mouse and keyboard at the same time caused it to crash.

Jolt Online Gaming gave Lula 3D a 1.8 out of 10 for making "every mistake that can possibly be made by the designers of a 3D adventure", criticizing its poorly-implemented controls and camera, tedious gameplay involving "mooching around listening to Lula's terribly voiced and poorly translated descriptions of everything around you, while collecting everything you can lay your hands on", and voice actors compared to people auditioning to be a phone sex operator. In conclusion, Jolt felt that "if you like good games, Lula 3D isn't for you. If you like sexual humour, Lula 3D isn't for you. If you have no qualms about pulling yourself off at the sight of dreadfully rendered computer characters shagging, then you need to check yourself in at your local therapy centre."

Eurogamer gave Lula 3D a 2 out of 10, jokingly declaring that its low quality and immature humor (such as the "Bouncin' Boobs Technology" advertised on its packaging) made the game feel like it was developed by and intended for 12-year-old boys. PC Zone gave the game a 3.1 out of 10, believing that it was "oddly compelling", but "so inexorably, mindbogglingly ignorant of how either real games or real sex works that it spread-eagles itself a fair way into the 'so-bad-it's good' category."

=== Ninjabread Man (2005) ===
Ninjabread Man, a budget game which reportedly started development as a planned third game in the Zool series, was criticized for its poor camera, controls, graphics, and its short length; critics noted that the game could be completed in half an hour. IGN gave Ninjabread Man a 1.5 out of 10, deriding the game for being a "broken mess" and having "just enough character design and gameplay to cover the bullet points on the back of the box", but felt that Ninjabread Man still had a "hilarious concept", and jokingly praised the game for having the best box art of any Wii game. Thunderbolt similarly gave Ninjabread Man a 1 out of 10, also noting that the premise itself had potential, but that the game itself did not have any "glimmer of innovation" and "couldn't be a more of a generic platformer if it tried."

Data Design Interactive was further criticized by both Eurogamer and IGN for releasing several other games, including Anubis II (2005), Myth Makers: Trixie in Toyland and Rock 'n' Roll Adventures (2007), that shared the same overall engine, gameplay, and soundtrack as Ninjabread Man, but with different settings and characters. This, in turn, caused the games to exhibit exactly the same issues as Ninjabread Man. IGN felt that the games were "shovelware at a science" and representative of a bulk, quantity-over-quality approach to video game development. IGN still felt that Ninjabread Man had more "appealing" thematics out of the three. Eurogamer gave all four games, including Ninjabread Man, a 1 out of 10, concluding that the games were "dross of the highest order. Rip offs at budget price. We deserve more than this. I've heard people perking up at Ninjabread Man because of its punny name. Don't be fooled."

On Metacritic, Ninjabread Man has an aggregate score of 20 out of 100 from six critic reviews.

=== Bomberman: Act Zero (2006) ===
A reimagining of the Bomberman series, Bomberman: Act Zero received negative reception from critics for its long loading times, bad collision detection, forgettable soundtrack, use of the same textures and graphics for every stage, tedious and repetitive gameplay, lack of a save feature, unbalanced A.I. and the series' unwelcome shift to a darker and more futuristic setting. The "First-Person Bomberman" mode was criticized for its bad camera angles and the fact that it is played in a third-person perspective. It holds an average score of 34 from Metacritic. Yahoo! Games' Mike Smith felt that the designers did not understand what made Bomberman great. He criticized its "generic, gritty brushed-metal-and-armor heroes". GamePro's Patrick Shaw felt that it should not be used to introduce players to the series, while fans of the games should skip it. Cracked.com named the game among their "6 Most Baffling Video Game Spinoffs" in 2013, commenting that the developers "took everything fun about Bomberman and made it crazy and depressing."

=== Sonic the Hedgehog (2006) ===
Produced to celebrate the Sonic the Hedgehog franchise's 15th anniversary and relaunch the brand for the next generation, Sonic the Hedgehog (often referred to as Sonic '06) was released in late 2006 for the Xbox 360 and PlayStation 3; in the midst of production, publisher Sega pushed the deadline forward to meet the forthcoming holiday season, and split the development team in half, with one half assigned to Sonic '06, and the other developing Sonic and the Secret Rings for the Wii. Sonic '06 received unfavorable reviews from critics and casual gamers alike for its sensitive controls, poor camera angles, numerous glitches, poor storyline riddled with plot holes, voice acting, extremely lengthy loading times, and level design, while its visuals and audio received a more mixed reception. IGN stated that "it offers a few good ideas, and a handful of exciting moments, but none of this helps the game recover from a catastrophic loss in control", while GameSpot lamented the gameplay, the number of glitches, camera problems and the supporting cast, stating "only the most blindly reverent Sonic the Hedgehog fan could possibly squeeze any enjoyment out of Sega's latest adventure". GameTrailers criticized the story as well, by saying that "you might actually be better off reading internet fan fiction." The game was ultimately listed as part of its "Top Ten Disappointments of the Decade" list.

The game has a Metacritic average of 46% for the Xbox 360 version and 43% for the PlayStation 3 version. In 2015, GamesRadar named Sonic the Hedgehog the 43rd worst game of all time, noting its "terrible" camera and "downright creepy" story.

GameTrailers and GamesRadar considered Sonic the Hedgehog one of the most disappointing games of 2006. GamesTM singled out the game when it ranked the Sonic franchise at the top of their list of "Video Game Franchises That Lost Their Way". The A.V. Club, Kotaku, Game Informer, and USgamer called the game the worst in the Sonic series, and the staff of GamesRadar named it among the worst video games of all time. The game remains popular for "Let's Play" walkthroughs, with players showing off its glitches. The official Sonic Twitter account also mocks the game. The failure of Sonic the Hedgehog led to the direction of the series being rethought. The next main Sonic game, 2008's Sonic Unleashed, ignored the gritty and realistic tone of its predecessor. With Unleashed's sequel Sonic Colors (2010), The A.V. Club wrote, "the series rediscovered its strength for whimsical tales with light tones."

=== Leisure Suit Larry: Box Office Bust (2009) ===
Leisure Suit Larry: Box Office Bust, the eighth installment in the Leisure Suit Larry adult-oriented adventure game franchise, was developed by Team17, and published by Codemasters—who acquired the franchise's intellectual property from Activision Blizzard. Box Office Bust was criticized for its poor gameplay and dated graphics, incoherent story, audio and technical issues, voice acting, and poor attempts at adult humor. On Metacritic, the game's PC version holds an aggregate score of 20/100 from 17 critic reviews; its PlayStation 3 port scored lower, with 17/100 based on 11 critic reviews.

IGN declared Box Office Bust to be "frustratingly unpolished, devoid of any kind of wit or charm, and packed with tiring, at times infuriating challenges", also featuring "uncomfortably unfunny dialogue spewed from the lips of entirely unlikable characters". In conclusion, it was explained that "the lowest rating numbers here at IGN are reserved for games with nearly no redeeming qualities or interesting ideas, with next to nothing enjoyable to offer players, and which under no circumstances should be purchased by anyone. Leisure Suit Larry: Box Office Bust is, without a doubt, one of those games."

ScrewAttack, Giant Bomb, and Australian television show Good Game named Leisure Suit Larry: Box Office Bust the worst game of 2009. Al Lowe, creator of Leisure Suit Larry, publicly thanked VU Games on his website for keeping him away from what he called "the latest disaster".

=== Stalin vs. Martians (2009) ===
Stalin vs. Martians is a parody real-time strategy video game developed by Black Wing Foundation, Dreamlore and N-Game, released on April 29, 2009. Described as "trashy and over-the-top" by its creators, the game mocks World War II strategy games and utilizes Pythonesque humor. The developers state that Stalin vs. Martians is "obviously a parody, which sometimes gets close to being a satire" and is "halfway to becoming a trash icon of gaming industry for years". In some interviews the lead designer of the game compares Stalin vs. Martians to the Troma films.

Stalin vs. Martians received scathing reviews from critics. It has an average score of 23.41% on GameRankings as well as 25% on Metacritic. GameSpot named it 2009's "Flat-Out Worst Game", awarding it a rating of 1.5/10 and calling it "perhaps the worst RTS game ever created." IGN, which rated the game a 2/10, noted the game's total lack of any RTS-related elements and asked whether it was "made in 1994 and sealed into a vault until 2009" given how dated the visuals looked. Resolution, awarding the game 35%, warned readers not to purchase the game, but conceded that it is occasionally "incredibly amusing".

=== Rogue Warrior (2009) ===
Rogue Warrior was initially developed by Zombie Studios under the title Rogue Warrior: Black Razor, and would have been an Unreal Engine 3-based game with drop-in four-player cooperative play, and 24-player competitive multiplayer using randomly generated maps based on a unique tiling system. Its publisher Bethesda Softworks was unsatisfied with the direction Zombie Studios was taking with the game, among other issues, citing the lack of emphasis on the personality of its protagonist Richard Marcinko. Bethesda rebooted the project with Rebellion Developments taking over development. The game was re-built from the ground up, scrapping Zombie Studios' work.

Upon its release, Rogue Warrior was panned by critics for its poor gameplay, controls, frequent use of profanity, short length, limited multiplayer, and broken combat techniques. GameSpot's Kevin VanOrd awarded Rogue Warrior a 2.0 out of 10, calling it "an absolute rip-off" and finding that Richard Marcinko "doesn't just drop an F-bomb—he drops an entire nuclear warhead of repulsive language." IGN's Jeff Hayes stated that "players should stay far away from this title at all costs" and rated it a 1.4 out of 10, criticizing its "laughable and barely existent" plot. Eurogamer's Richard Leadbetter called it "the worst game I've played on [PlayStation 3 or Xbox 360] for a long, long time."

In 2019, PC Gamer listed Rogue Warrior as being among "the worst PC games of all time", considering it "truly one of the worst first-person shooters in living memory", and akin to "one of those straight-to-video action movies you'd see on a DVD rack in a garage, but somehow dumber."

== 2010s ==
=== Final Fantasy XIV (2010) ===
Final Fantasy XIV is a massively multiplayer online role-playing game (MMORPG) in Square Enix's Final Fantasy series, developed as a spiritual successor to Final Fantasy XI. The game was released for Microsoft Windows on September 30, 2010, with plans for a PlayStation 3 port. The initial release of the game was met with poor reviews, with critics describing grind-heavy gameplay, poor controls, and a confusing user interface. The game holds a Metacritic score of 49/100. According to Naoki Yoshida, who took on overseeing the game's remake, the original version of Final Fantasy XIV suffered in production as there had been too much focus on the graphics quality, and little understanding of the fundamentals of a good MMORPG with the expectation that problems could be fixed with updates and patches later.

Shortly after release, then-CEO of Square Enix Yoichi Wada issued an official apology for the quality of the game at the 2011 Tokyo Game Show in December 2011, saying that "the Final Fantasy brand [had] been greatly damaged". The PlayStation 3 port was cancelled, and Square Enix eventually shut off the game's servers on November 11, 2012, as to redevelop the game from scratch into Final Fantasy XIV: A Realm Reborn. Yoshida stated that they felt it was necessary to rebuild the game from the ground up to regain the trust that they lost from fans of the series for the original game, and not strictly as a business decision. The new version was released in August 2013, and was received much more positively, with an 83/100 score for the PC version on Metacritic. Since then, the game continues to be supported with expansions and new content for players, and ports for Xbox and Nintendo consoles.

=== Power Gig: Rise of the SixString (2010) ===
Released in a market that had already been saturated by rock music-oriented music video games simulating guitar and drums, Power Gig: Rise of the SixString—developed by Seven45 Studios, a subsidiary of mass-market instrument manufacturer First Act—attempted to differentiate itself from competitors such as the Rock Band and Guitar Hero franchises by shipping with an actual electric guitar that could be used in-game, rather than a simplified plastic analog (although existing guitar and drum controllers designed for the franchises could still be used with the game). As opposed to an electronic drum set with physical pads, the game offered an "AirStrike" drum controller, which utilized motion sensors placed on the ground.

Upon its release, Power Gig received negative reviews from critics. The game's guitar was considered low-quality—not performing well as either a controller or standalone instrument, while the AirStrike drum controller was criticized for its poor hit detection, a reliance on proprietary, sensor-equipped drum sticks, and the lack of physical feedback contradicting the game's promoted focus on realism. The gameplay of Power Gig was criticized for being nearly identical to its competitors, even with its dedicated guitar (which only enabled the addition of basic, two-note power chords to songs), and for making little effort in providing any education on the instrument's fundamentals (in contrast to the similar "Pro Guitar" modes of its launch competitor Rock Band 3). Griffin McElroy of Joystiq pointed out that, ironically, despite "[centering] itself around a peripheral which is a real guitar", Power Gig "[settled] for using a new toy to manipulate an old game—but still manages to categorically fail at both." The game was also criticized for its storyline—which IGN declared to be "laughably bad", the exclusion of bass guitar modes, and poor-quality graphics and character animations.

Power Gig holds an aggregate score of 36/100 on Metacritic, and was named the worst game of 2010 by Giant Bomb.

=== Postal III (2011) ===
Development of Postal III was subcontracted by Running with Scissors due to the 2008 financial crisis to Russian publisher Akella, who hired the developer Trashmasters. Neither Trashmasters nor Akella had the resources to develop the game to the design that the series' creators intended. The game ultimately received poor reviews from critics, scoring an average review score on Metacritic of 24/100. Running with Scissors pulled Postal III from its own online store, calling it an "unfinished mess" and recommending earlier installments of the franchise instead. In 2015, the Paradise Lost DLC for Postal 2 retconned the events of Postal III as being a dream experienced by the Postal Dude while he was in an 11-year coma after being involved in a car accident. Postal 4: No Regerts (2022) was billed by Running with Scissors as being the "true" sequel to Postal 2, with the studio also stating that "no third [Postal] game is known to exist".

PC Gamer gave Postal III a 21/100, joking that "suck and blow" were "two things that Postal III will continue to do for some hours", criticizing its lack of an open world design like Postal 2, poor AI, and poor attempts at being offensive (drawing comparisons to the quality of Uwe Boll's film adaptation). IGN felt that the game's technical and gameplay issues (including long loading times) were more offensive than the game's content, and criticized the lack of variety or openness in its missions. The game's humor, wide variety of weapons (despite most of the unique weapons not being as useful in-game as their conventional counterparts), and relatively better graphical quality than Postal 2 were regarded as positive aspects, but not enough to save the game from a 5.5/10 rating. Game Informer gave the game a 1/10, criticizing its "barely cobbled-together series of mostly linear levels", lazily using self-awareness to point out bugs that should have been fixed before release (such as a warning that an escort would "frustratingly disappear" if left behind), and concluding that there was "nothing redeeming about Postal III's frustrating, buggy gameplay." In 2013, Computer and Video Games deemed it one of the 12 worst video games of all time.

=== FlatOut 3: Chaos & Destruction (2011) ===
FlatOut 3: Chaos & Destruction is a sequel of the FlatOut franchise, a vehicular combat series originally developed by Bugbear Entertainment and published by Empire Interactive, that features realistic destruction of cars and track obstacles. After releasing FlatOut 2, Bugbear had been tapped by Bandai Namco to develop Ridge Racer Unbounded, and for the third FlatOut game, publisher Strategy First gave development duties to Team6 Game Studios. While Team6 had done numerous racing games prior, their approach to FlatOut 3 was significantly different from how Bugbear approached the title, and FlatOut 3: Chaos & Destruction was universally panned by critics and fans alike.

The game received generally unfavorable reviews according to the review aggregation website Metacritic. with a score of 23/100. Metacritic lists the game as the lowest scoring game of 2011. FlatOut 3 is one of the two games Edge has ever given a score of one out of ten to in its history (the other being Kabuki Warriors). Eurogamer also gave it a one out of ten score and criticised all aspects of the game, especially the controls and the AI. It also lamented the fall from grace of the FlatOut series as a whole and summed up the review by saying, "You could go mad trying to rationalise Flatout 3. It is not bad in the way that a game like Boiling Point is bad, where things coalesce into a kind of awful greatness. This is a tacky and technically incompetent production with no redeeming features whatsoever, devoid of fun and an insult to the name it bears. Flatout once burned bright, but now is gone – and if there is a driving hell, this is surely it." GamesMaster also gave the game one out of ten and said, "Some games are so bad they're good (for a laugh, at least). FlatOut 3 is just plain bad." GameSpot gave the game its highest score by giving it five out of ten, praising the Demolition mode and the wide range of game modes, but like in other reviews the AI, controls and the bad collision detection were criticised.

=== Infestation: Survivor Stories (2012) ===
Infestation: Survivor Stories, an open world multiplayer survival horror game, was publicly released as a "foundation release" in December 2012 under the name The War Z. The game received negative reception from various publications for its poor gameplay experience, and for its use of microtransactions for purchasing items and reviving characters without waiting four hours, despite the game not being a freemium "free-to-play" game. GameSpy gave The War Z a half-star out of five and considered it "a bad game that deserves all the controversy it's drawn", criticizing the broken state of the game and its use of microtransactions, but complimenting its overall atmosphere and far draw distance. IGN gave the game a 3.0 out of 10, citing that "the high spawn rate of weapons, as well as fear of hackers, makes the majority of player interaction in The War Z overly punishing and one-dimensional", and further criticized its missing features, the ability to lose purchased items, and its lack of a balance between ranged and melee weaponry.

Its developer, Hammerpoint Interactive, was also accused of false advertising by players; since the game's promotional material on Steam at the time highlighted certain features that were not yet present in the game, such as multiple large game worlds varying in size (only one was available), a skill point-based leveling system (which was not yet implemented), servers supporting up to 100 players (that were actually capped at 50), and private servers. Despite this information being corrected to consider them "upcoming" features, the flood of criticism prompted Valve to pull the game from sale on Steam and offer refunds, stating that the game was accidentally made available for purchase prematurely. In an interview with PC Gamer, executive producer Sergey Titov (who was also listed as a producer for Big Rigs: Over the Road Racing) claimed that its servers were temporarily capped at 50 due to player feedback and that its marketing team had misinterpreted information about the current state of the game. Due to its similar themes, gameplay, and title, some also felt that The War Z was a clone of the popular Arma 2: Operation Arrowhead mod DayZ (of which a standalone version was in development); on June 20, 2013, Hammerpoint announced that the game would be renamed Infestation: Survivor Stories, "primarily as a result of some confusion and trademark issues with a similarly titled property" (a statement which also factored in a conflict with the film World War Z). (Note: Attributed to multiple sources:)

=== SimCity (2013) ===
SimCity, developed by Maxis and Electronic Arts (EA), was aimed to augment the normally single-player city-building game with online features that would allow players' cities to interact with one another, building a software platform rather than a single game. The game was released in March 2013, but there was no offline mode, and the servers for online connectivity were over capacity, requiring players to wait upwards of thirty minutes to play for several weeks following launch. According to Maxis staff, EA and Maxis drastically underestimated the server requirements for the player base size, and found several "pinch points" through the process that they had to resolve one at a time. EA and Maxis eventually resolved server issues by expanding capacity and disabling certain "non-critical" features. Users also found that promised improvements to the artificial intelligence were not present, and that the available land for city building was much more restrictive than previous iterations. Users were further critical when it was found that the game could be run in an offline mode using special debugging commands, to which Maxis responded saying that they opted against an offline mode as "it didn't fit with our vision". By October 2013, EA and Maxis were discussing the possibility of adding an offline mode, and a year after release, the game was updated to support this.

The game received lukewarm reviews from critics, with an aggregate score of 64/100 from Metacritic, but was hit hard with many negative user reviews. The initial server issues created enough negative user reviews at retailer Amazon that the retailer temporarily halted sales of the game for a few days. While some users that purchased retail editions of the game were able to get refunds, those that had purchased it digitally through EA's Origin service could not get refunds, and instead EA offered users a choice of one free game from eight offerings as to make up for the server issues. EA was named as the "Worst Company in America" in a 2013 Consumerist user-voted poll, with the debacle over SimCity's service launch as part of the reason some voted this way.

As a result of the poor reception to the game, Electronic Arts had shuttered Maxis' main Emeryville, California studio by 2015, transferring Maxis' other franchises like The Sims to other EA studios. Separately, Colossal Order, a studio under Paradox Interactive, had been wanting to make a city simulator for some time, but Paradox had been hesitant of SimCity's influence on the market. Following the failure of SimCity, Paradox greenlit Colossal Order's Cities: Skylines, which was released in 2015. By contrast, Cities: Skylines was critically acclaimed and commercially successful, with some outlets considering the game to have succeeded SimCity as the game most representative of the genre. (Note: Attributed to multiple sources:)

=== Aliens: Colonial Marines (2013) ===
Aliens: Colonial Marines, a first-person shooter developed by Gearbox Software and set in the universe of the Alien franchise, was criticized at launch for containing bugs, poorly-implemented AI, unbalanced gameplay, low-quality graphics, and a poorly-implemented co-op mode. The game's story also drew criticism for its lack of a consistent continuity with the Alien films, despite claims from the developers that the events of the game were supposed to be canon to the film series. (Note: Attributed to multiple sources:)

Particular criticism was directed towards discrepancies in the game's quality between pre-release builds demonstrated at events and in promotional materials—the former purporting to feature "actual gameplay", and the final product, including lower graphics quality, missing levels, and other regressions. Shortly after the game's release and the discovery of these regressions, Gearbox CEO Randy Pitchford acknowledged the issues and stated that the studio would look into them. It was reported that, as is common practice, the demo was optimized for high-end PC hardware, and that after the game was returned from its subcontractor TimeGate Studios to Gearbox, the studio made changes to optimize the game's performance for consoles.

In April 2013, a class action lawsuit was filed against Gearbox Software and the game's publisher, Sega. The suit argued that these differences, along with a press embargo on publishing reviews of the final product until its release date, deceived those who pre-ordered the game based on the pre-release promotional materials, amounting to false advertising. In September 2014, Sega agreed to pay a tentative settlement of $1.25 million. Gearbox, as a result of the fallout from Aliens: Colonial Marines, made it a company policy to avoid talking in depth about any future game until it was in the late stages of development (such as not announcing Borderlands 3 until it had reached the beta testing stage) to avoid a similar misstep.

In October 2017, a mod developer reviewing the game's code found that a typo in its configuration files resulted in the poor artificial intelligence shown by the game's enemies observed at its original release; manually correcting the error led to the enemies having more consistent behavior with press material as well as the Aliens from the film franchise.

=== Ride to Hell: Retribution (2013) ===
Announced in 2008 as a Grand Theft Auto-styled game set during the late 1960s, the eventual release of Ride to Hell: Retribution in June 2013 was universally panned by critics. In particular, the game was criticized for its largely broken gameplay, poorly-implemented controls, poor voice acting and story, negative portrayal of women, and dropping the originally announced open-world format in favor of a linear structure. Daniel Starkey of GameSpot considered Ride to Hell: Retribution to be "painfully insubstantial" and broken all-around, criticizing its plot for showing a "pathetic, out-of-touch approach to sex, violence, and masculinity", and believing that its developers were showing a lack of respect towards players due to the game's abysmal quality. Describing it as the newest candidate for "Worst Game of All Time", Starkey gave Ride to Hell a 1.0 out of 10, making it only the second game (behind Big Rigs) to receive GameSpot's lowest possible rating.

EGM described Ride to Hell as being "a linear, insultingly underdeveloped mess" with "endlessly clunky gameplay" and numerous bugs and glitches, concluding that "other games may have offered less content for more money or come up shorter in specific, individual areas, but I don't think there's ever been a game that does so many things so universally poorly", giving the game 0.5 out of 10. Escapist writer Yahtzee Croshaw described Ride to Hell as "congealed failure" and the single worst game he ever reviewed at the time, giving it the "lifetime achievement award for total abhorrence" to distinguish it from the top five worst games he regularly names for each year.

The game has a Metacritic score of 19 out of 100, based on 14 reviews of the Xbox 360 version. It is the third lowest scoring game on the Xbox 360, and the lowest scoring retail Xbox 360 game. It received a 13 out of 100 score from Metacritic for the PS3 version, making it the lowest-scoring PS3 game.

=== Double Dragon II: Wander of the Dragons (2013) ===
Double Dragon II: Wander of the Dragons is a 3D beat 'em up game loosely based on the arcade version of Double Dragon II: The Revenge, developed by Korean game studio GRAVITY and published by Barunson Creative Co. Ltd. The title was first announced in 2011, but was shelved for release for two years. It was eventually released on April 5, 2013, as a digital download for the Xbox 360 via the Xbox Live Arcade service. It received extremely negative reviews, holding a score of 15.83% on GameRankings (making it the third-worst reviewed game on the site only behind Big Rigs: Over the Road Racing and Ride to Hell: Retribution) and a score of 17 on Metacritic, indicating "overwhelming dislike". GamesRadar ranked it as the 42nd worst game ever made, comparing it unfavorably to the previous Double Dragon Neon. Metro gave it a 1/10 score and called it the "worst game ever".

=== Fighter Within (2013) ===
Fighter Within is a Kinect-based fighting game published by Ubisoft in 2013 and sequel to the similarly Kinect-based, and similarly maligned, Fighters Uncaged. It was an Xbox One launch title, with Kinect bundled with new systems, and the only Kinect-required exclusive title at its launch. The game promised "the most immersive total-body combat experience ever" but was met with overwhelmingly negative reviews from both users and reviewers and had an aggregate score of 23% on Metacritic.

One of the game's main criticisms was its inability to comprehend motion control and how movement is limited to the person playing, making said player uncomfortable and embarrassed. Another criticism towards the game was the cast of characters mocked for having racist stereotypes, frustratingly similar fighting styles, stiff dialogue and boring character design. It was noted as having slightly better motion control than Fighters Uncaged but it was still said that "you can't do anything you want to". While not the sole reason, Fighter Within did not make a strong showing of Kinect on the Xbox One, and coupled with other factors, soon led to Microsoft removing Kinect from Xbox One bundles and slowly deprecating the hardware for gaming purposes.

=== Assassin's Creed Unity (2014) ===
Assassin's Creed Unity, the eighth major installment of Ubisoft's action-adventure franchise Assassin's Creed, was released in November 2014 for Microsoft Windows, PlayStation 4, and Xbox One. Ubisoft had been releasing a main Assassin's Creed annually since 2009, and alongside Unity, simultaneously released Assassin's Creed Rogue for the PlayStation 3 and Xbox 360. Concerns were raised in the industry that this release schedule could impact the quality of the games.

Unity received mixed reviews from critics, due to its widespread game-breaking bugs, glitches, degraded graphic performance, and online connectivity issues. (Note: Attributed to multiple sources:) Ubisoft did provide extensive patches to correct the bugs, but the complaints from players prompted the company to issue an apology and offer compensation in the form of a free expansion, Dead Kings, which acts as an epilogue to the base game's story. Players who had bought the game's season pass (which was later made unavailable for purchase in response to the controversy) additionally received a free copy of another Ubisoft title of their choice. Ubisoft Montreal CEO Yannis Mallat apologized on behalf of the studio with regard to the poor launch of Unity, stating that the "overall quality of the game was diminished by bugs and unexpected technical issues", and prevented users from "experiencing the game at its fullest potential".

The patches and additional content somewhat improved Unity's reception among players, but caused damage to both Ubisoft's and the brand's reputation. The 2015 game, Assassin's Creed Syndicate, while also receiving generally positive reviews from critics, saw lower-than-expected sales compared to previous Assassin's Creed titles, according to Ubisoft, attributed to the impact of Unity on their brand. Ubisoft did not release an Assassin's Creed title in 2016, instead spending extra time to "evolve the game mechanics" and reposition the series as a "premier open-world franchise", leading to the more successful Assassin's Creed Origins in 2017.

=== Dungeon Keeper (2014) ===
Dungeon Keeper was a freemium MMO strategy video game developed by Mythic Entertainment and published by Electronic Arts for the iOS and Android platforms. It was intended to serve as a reboot of the Dungeon Keeper series directed and designed by Peter Molyneux. The game was heavily panned due to its monetization practices. For example, critics condemned the time the Gem Veins take to dig, which forces players to either wait for varying amounts of time or purchase Gems with real money, practices that were not present in the original Dungeon Keeper games. The Metacritic score for the iOS version is a 42/100. IGN rewarded the game a 3/10, Eurogamer rewarded the game a 1/10, and Metro rewarded the game a 0/10. The game was deemed "unplayable" by some critics. Molyneux criticized the game's monetization implementations as well, describing them as "ridiculous".

The criticisms of the game were exacerbated when Electronic Arts was accused of censoring in-game user ratings lower than five stars by making those players fill out a "feedback form" instead of directly completing a Google Play review. The British Advertising Standards Authority soon ruled that Electronic Arts' advertising of the "free" nature of the game misled customers, ordered the creation of fine print explaining the in-app purchases, and banned the original adverts. The game was shut down in 2022.

=== Sonic Boom: Rise of Lyric (2014) ===
Sonic Boom: Rise of Lyric is a 2014 spin-off from the Sonic the Hedgehog franchise developed by Big Red Button Entertainment—a studio co-founded by Naughty Dog alumni E. Daniel Arey and Bob Rafei—and published by Sega for the Wii U. The game was released alongside a tie-in game titled Sonic Boom: Shattered Crystal developed by Sanzaru Games for the Nintendo 3DS. Although both games received generally negative reviews from critics, Rise of Lyric was especially derided for its numerous bugs and glitches, poor graphics and level design, over-simplistic gameplay, and bad writing. On Metacritic, the game holds an aggregate score of 32/100 from 28 critic reviews.

Don Saas of GameSpot noted that "through a combination of unwieldy controls, a broken camera system, and a total lack of responsiveness, the platforming and exploration elements of Rise of Lyric are totally unworkable." GameCentral considered Rise of Lyric to be "definitely the worst game of 2014", citing "a terrible camera, awful controls, unspeakably dull combat, insipid level design, ugly character art, broken graphics, serious bugs, and the terrible feeling that Sega hates both you and Sonic." Both Metro and Nintendo World Report referred to it as potentially the worst Sonic game of all time.

Both games were commercial failures. In February 2015, Sega announced that Rise of Lyric and Shattered Crystal had moved 490,000 units combined, indicating that Rise of Lyric sold less copies than any other major entry into the franchise.

=== Alone in the Dark: Illumination (2015) ===
The sixth installment in the Alone in the Dark franchise was published by Atari in 2015 centering around a team of four cooperative characters investigating a mysterious figure in a haunted house. Alone in the Dark: Illumination received universally negative reviews. It received an aggregated score of 19% on GameRankings based on five reviews and 19% on Metacritic based on 12 reviews, indicating "overwhelming dislike", and was ranked as the worst game of 2015. James Stephanie Sterling stated that Illumination was "ugly in every sense of the word, not just visually – though it is about as attractive as an anus in an eye socket", while criticizing its cooperative play and the mechanic of using light sources to defeat enemies.

=== Tony Hawk's Pro Skater 5 (2015) ===
A revival of the Tony Hawk's franchise developed by Robomodo, Tony Hawk's Pro Skater 5 was panned for its poor quality, especially in comparison to its predecessors, with reviews citing various performance issues, environmental clipping, and physics issues. The game's environments were criticized for their poor aesthetics, unmemorable level themes, small size, dull challenge tasks, lack of NPCs, and for not containing as many hidden secrets as those in previous Tony Hawk games. Before the game was released, the licensing deal between Activision and Tony Hawk was set to expire at the end of 2015. As a result, the game was hastily developed within a few months and released unfinished with little promotion. The physical game disk contained only the tutorial and park creator; players needed to download a day one patch to access the rest of the game. The nature of the game's online modes were criticized for providing little incentive to players and exacerbating the game's performance issues. Pro Skater 5 would be the last major game in the series until the release of Tony Hawk's Pro Skater 1 + 2, a remaster of the first two games, in 2020.

IGN gave the game a 3.5 out of 10, concluding that "Tony Hawk's Pro Skater 5's rare moments of nostalgic joy are drowned out by its abundance of poorly thought out levels, control problems, bugs, and its glaring lack of attitude. It boggles the mind that a $60 game in 2015 can be riddled with so many technical issues." Giving Tony Hawk's Pro Skater 5 a 3 out of 10, GameSpot argued that "within THPS5 lies a basic skating game that's difficult to enjoy, because you have to jump over numerous hoops and ignore a plethora of obvious issues to find the smallest amount of fun." Polygon named Tony Hawk's Pro Skater 5 one of the worst games of 2015, stating that it was "so broken, so garish and so grim that reformed Tony Hawk lovers rue the day they first laid eyes on the franchise. Sometimes, it's better to leave what's past in the past."

=== Umbrella Corps (2016) ===
Umbrella Corps is a tactical shooter spin-off of the Resident Evil franchise released for the PlayStation 4 and PC and has been panned for its poor gameplay mechanics. IGN's Brian Albert rated the game 3.8 out of 10: "[The] balance is absurd, controls are clumsy, and it fails to pull anything meaningful from the Resident Evil universe". Peter Brown of GameSpot rated it 3/10: "Umbrella Corps is a forgettable game dominated by bland action and half-baked mechanics." Zach Furniss of Destructoid lambasted the game as "a broken sludgy mess that fails in just about every way." Game Rant's John Jacques wrote in his review, "The game doesn't know what it wants to be, and as a result, this is another lackluster spinoff from Capcom—one we're eager to forget." Ben Reeves of Game Informer commented, "Thanks to all of its flaws, Umbrella Corps feels like a grotesque online oddity that everyone should just ignore—which everyone is already doing." Cade Onder of GameZone labeled the game "the worst entry in the Resident Evil franchise since 6," citing its "clumsy and even confusing" gameplay. Russ Frushtick of Polygon remarked that "the controls feel like you're walking on ice skates. It's abysmal." In 2017, The Telegraph's Olivia White rated it the worst game in the Resident Evil series, while PC Gamer ranked it the second-worst game in the franchise behind Operation Raccoon City for its "straight up broken" controls, which they deemed "unforgivable". Umbrella Corps holds a rating of 38 out of 100 on Metacritic, based on 55 reviews.

=== No Man's Sky (2016) ===
No Man's Sky was announced in 2013 as a space exploration game that features over 18 quintillion planets in its virtual universe each with its own set of flora and fauna, all formed in-game through procedural generation. The game, developed by a small team from Hello Games, quickly gained significant attention and media hype across the gaming media due to its expansive goals, which was boosted further when Sony announced it would help to publish the game for the PlayStation 4 alongside a Microsoft Windows version. Sean Murray, a co-founder of Hello Games and the lead developer for No Man's Sky, gave numerous interviews over the following years during development, announcing the game's features, including multiplayer.

Just prior to No Man's Sky's August 2016 release, early-released copies revealed that some of the expected gameplay features did not appear present in the game, and were still missing following a day-zero patch. Specifically, there appeared to be no multiplayer, and other features demonstrated in promotional videos and Murray's interviews were absent. Atop this, players found the game lacked a quality of procedural uniqueness (in that there was little overall variation in the planets relative to the scale of the game), and the gameplay elements necessary to explore were tedious. Though Murray had tried to set expectations prior to release, the game received a wide range of reviews and generally negative reviews from players. Negative player reception was compounded by the apparent lack of communication from Hello Games towards these issues, with the team only reporting on bug fixes and performance improvements that they released. Murray later admitted that their initial silence post-release had come about due to drastically underestimating the player size they had to support at the start.

Hello Games has since released several free, major updates to the game in the ten years after release to incorporate most of these missing features, including multiplayer modes, as well as other significant additions, such as virtual reality support, which have been met with praise, being described as bringing the game's quality up to and beyond the state expected prior to its launch. By the time of its five-year anniversary, No Man's Sky's user reviews on Steam had swung to "mostly positive" after initially starting at "overwhelmingly negative" at the time of its release. The game is considered a key reminder of what to avoid in marketing a game, with many commentators discussing the proper means to generate interest in games "in a post-No Man's Sky world". (Note: Attributed to multiple sources:)

=== Star Wars Battlefront II (2017) ===
Star Wars Battlefront II, primarily an online multiplayer shooter, was developed by EA DICE as a sequel to the 2015 game. One element that EA had sought to change was how microtransactions would be handled; the first game offered additional characters and settings through downloadable content, but EA found that this segmented the player community between those who had purchased the additional content and those who had not.

Instead, EA opted to use loot box mechanics (called Star Crates in-game) believing this would help maintain its player community; players could earn Star Crates, containing a random collection of in-game items distributed by rarity, over time by playing the game, but could also spend real-world funds to acquire these. While such loot crates were an established mechanism in video games, the approach used by Battlefront II during its pre-launch beta period was found to be problematic to players. Star Crates not only contained gameplay-altering elements, thus seen as "pay-to-win", but were the fastest way to unlock the more popular Star Wars characters rather than acquiring them through hours of gameplay. Players and some journalists were vocal about these concerns, which were coupled with general negative attention drawn to loot box mechanics in 2017 from other video games. Just prior to the game's planned launch in November 2017, Disney (who owned the rights to Star Wars) contacted EA over the situation, leading EA to disable all of the game's microtransaction processes indefinitely until they could work out a solution. The new system was put in place by March 2018, addressing both key concerns.

While Battlefront II received mixed reviews from critics, the negative perception of the game by the player base troubled EA's stockholders, and within a week of its November 2017 release, EA's stock market value dropped by US$3 billion, attributed to the Battlefront II loot box backlash. In its Q4 2017 quarterly financials, EA stated that Battlefront II had missed their sales expectation by at least 10%, which EA's CFO Blake Jorgensen attributed to the player base reaction to how EA had implemented and handled the loot box issue. The attention generated by Battlefront II's loot crates also drew worldwide government and industry responses in late 2017 and beyond to evaluate whether loot box mechanics in video games were a form of gambling particularly to minors and the potential need for regulations.

=== Fallout 76 (2018) ===
Fallout 76 is an online action role-playing game in the Fallout series. Developed by Bethesda Game Studios, Fallout 76 represented the studio's first foray for a fully online game, as well as the first time multiplayer is included in a Fallout game developed by Bethesda Studios. Fallout 76's initial Metacritic scores across PC, PlayStation 4, and Xbox One platforms had an average of about 51/100, with user reviews being even more critical of the game.

A 2022 report from Kotaku based on interviews with former developers and QA testers on the game asserted that a number of issues in management led to the game having a problematic start, even with added crunch time to make it ready for the scheduled launch. The game shipped with a large number of bugs and glitches, and Bethesda's early patches to fix these were large and at times, reintroduced bugs that had previously been fixed. Other complaints from players focused on the expensive pricing of in-game cosmetics, as well as introducing items that gave gameplay advantages which could similarly be bought with real money. Additionally, there was criticism for Bethesda's attitude towards players using mods, regardless of whether their intentions were harmful or not, as well as the game's lack of sufficient anti-cheat protection due to large-scale examples of hacking. (Note: Attributed to multiple sources:) Like No Man's Sky, Bethesda had not been as communicative of its efforts to improve the game following release, leading to further consternation within the player base. Todd Howard, executive producer at Bethesda, said in 2021 "When [Fallout 76] launched, the litany of issues we had, we let a lot of people down. There was very little we didn't screw up, honestly."

The choice to include a premium subscription service in October 2019 was met with criticism as players had expected some of the exclusive features to have been provided for free. (Note: Attributed to multiple sources:) The service was also hampered by bugs upon release, including one that deleted all items from the Scrapbox, an item "Fallout 1st" players receive that allows unlimited storage of building materials. Bethesda has since addressed those bugs and gave any players thought to be affected by the Scrapbox bug free in-game materials as an apology. (Note: Attributed to multiple sources:)

Several promotional facets of Fallout 76 failed to meet original expectations. As part of the game's premium physical content, the promotional canvas bag and an alcoholic beverage bottle were found to not match the original products' descriptions as shipped, while thousands of Fallout-themed helmets were recalled due to containing dangerous levels of mold.

By 2020, Bethesda's work to improve the game has garnered praise from its users. On its release to Steam in April of that year, its users worked to fight a review bomb by posting positive reviews and experiences of the game since release. As of December 2022, Fallout 76 had 13.5 million total players and was considered by Eurogamer to have turned around from its initial poor launch.

=== WWE 2K20 (2019) ===
WWE 2K20 is a professional wrestling video game developed by Visual Concepts and published by 2K Sports in 2019, part of the ongoing WWE series of video games based on the WWE sporting franchise. The series had traditionally been developed by Yuke's and published by THQ. THQ went bankrupt in 2012, and 2K acquired the WWE property then. 2K kept Yuke's on as the lead developer and had assigned Visual Concepts, an internal studio with several years of experience in sports simulation games, to assist. Yuke's role in development was gradually diminished over the years, and they were removed as the lead developers for WWE 2K20, though affirmed they would provide Visual Concepts and 2K with support for the game's engine while they pursued a new wrestling IP (which in 2020 would be revealed to be an All Elite Wrestling game). Visual Concepts considered this gave them freedom to explore new options for the game that they felt Yuke's had been holding them back on.

The game received "generally unfavorable" reviews on all platforms according to Metacritic. Reviewers and players alike found numerous glitches resulting from the game engine which were attributed to the removal of Yuke's from the development of the title, and the hashtag #FixWWE2K20 began trending across social media. At the start of 2020, the game was rendered almost unplayable due to a "Y2k20" bug.

As a result, plans for a WWE 2K21 game were cancelled in March 2020 according to WWE. Justin Leeper, a former writer for the series, stated that a combination of development problems with Visual Studios without Yuke's and poor sales, in addition to issues from the COVID-19 pandemic, led 2K to put the series on hold, but in favor of a different style of WWE game as a replacement from a different studio. 2K announced the spin-off title, WWE 2K Battlegrounds, which was developed by Saber Interactive, as an arcade-action, "over-the-top" game. The game was released in September 2020 to mixed reviews. WWE 2K22 was officially announced through a teaser trailer which aired before the main event of WrestleMania 37 in Tampa, Florida. (Note: Attributed to multiple sources:) WWE 2K22 received "generally favorable reviews" for the PlayStation 4, PlayStation 5, and Xbox Series X/S versions and "mixed or average reviews" for the Microsoft Windows version according to Metacritic based on five, 58, 27, and 11 reviews respectively. (Note: Attributed to multiple sources:)

== 2020s ==
=== Warcraft III: Reforged (2020) ===
Warcraft III: Reforged is a remastered edition of the 2002 real-time strategy video game Warcraft III: Reign of Chaos and its expansion Warcraft III: The Frozen Throne, and was developed and published by Blizzard Entertainment and released on January 28, 2020. The game was released as an update to the existing Warcraft III product on Battle.net; this provided new character models and other improved graphic features, but most other engine changes were patched over the original Warcraft III for all owners of this product. The game received aggregated mixed reviews from critics and as of 2021 is the lowest rated Blizzard game on Metacritic. Additionally, the game received a very negative reaction from players; it is "overwhelmingly disliked" according to user reviews on Metacritic, and received the lowest user score of any video game on the site shortly after its launch. Users complained of the lack of promised features as well as losing features that were in the current Warcraft III product, lack of updated cutscenes with the updated character models, and other issues related to the confusion whether the product was to be a remaster or a remake. The game has also been compared unfavorably to EA Games' Command & Conquer Remastered Collection, which was better received for its improvements over the source material. According to a report from Bloomberg News, the remaster had a troubled history from the start due to Activision pressuring Blizzard to move away from these remasters and staying to new games, along with internal management problems that hampered development. The game was only decided to be released to fulfill pre-orders and avoid having to refund those orders. Additionally, Blizzard's internal Classic Games team was disbanded about eight months after release, making resolving issues with the game difficult.

By February 2020, Blizzard offered a no-questions-asked refund policy for users disappointed with the updates and promised that they would work to address player issues. Sam Machkovech from Ars Technica stated in January 2021 that Warcraft III: Reforged stood out as the "most staggering and baffling disappointment" of 2020 in video games, and argued that unlike other games released in the same year, it had a "full 12 months of opportunity to right its own ship" without any forthcoming improvements. In addition to committing to continued updates to Reforged as part of an announcement in February 2021, Blizzard's president J. Allen Brack said they learned several lessons in how they developed Reforged that they will avoid in their next remaster, Diablo II: Resurrected.

=== Cyberpunk 2077 (2020) ===
Cyberpunk 2077 is an action role-playing game developed by CD Projekt, based on the Cyberpunk tabletop role-playing game. The game was first announced to be in development in 2012, and following a major showcase for the game at E3 2019, won many awards prior to release. At the presentation, the game was scheduled for release in April 2020. At the onset of the COVID-19 pandemic, CD Projekt announced the game was being delayed until December 10, 2020, shortly after the launch of the latest home consoles – the PlayStation 5 and the Xbox Series X/S. The game was also set for release on Microsoft Windows, Google Stadia and the PlayStation 4 and Xbox One consoles.

Critical scores were favorable upon release based on the Windows version; later reports indicated that the console versions of the game had been withheld from journalists. In response, CD Projekt CEO Marcin Iwiński apologized and explained that they had hoped to be able to fix them ahead of the game's launch. Twelve days after release, the Metacritic score for the Windows version was at 86 out of 100, while the PlayStation 4 and Xbox One versions were scored at 55 and 54, respectively. Numerous glitches and game-breaking software bugs were documented. Players began asking for refunds for the game through retailers and digital storefronts. Both Sony and Microsoft eventually agreed to allow refunds. After a discussion with CD Projekt, Sony also recalled Cyberpunk 2077 from their online store for about six months while CD Projekt worked to remove bugs and improve performance to Sony's standards, with the game returning to sale in June 2021.

According to CD Projekt developers, management was aware that the game was not ready for release but refused to listen to their warnings. The game's launch has been described as "a shambles", and the company's stock fell by 9.4%. CD Projekt has also been subject to at least one lawsuit for fraudulent claims made to investors related to the state of the game. In a January 2021 open message outlining the company's plans to patch and improve the game, CD Projekt's co-CEO Marcin Iwiński stated that they had "underestimated the task" of taking a game that was optimized for personal computers to work well on the older consoles, and their testing had not revealed the problems that players had seen on release; he further affirmed it was the management's decision to release the game and not the developers' fault. As CD Projekt began releasing major patches for the game in March 2021, the company stated that in future games, they will avoid announcing any new titles until they are "much closer" to a launch state.

CD Projekt continued to patch and improve the game through 2022 and, in partnership with Netflix, released a limited anime series called Cyberpunk: Edgerunners in September 2022. The series was well-received, and the game itself saw a resurgence in players and new purchases; its concurrent player count on Steam exceeded one million users within weeks of the series' launch, and surpassed records set by The Witcher 3: Wild Hunt, another CD Projekt title. One developer, who had intended to quit after the initial launch of the game due to the poor reception, said in light of the Edgerunners boost, "So to have this moment, of people liking something that we did, it's really feeling a bit unreal. That finally people are appreciating it." In September 2023, CD Projekt released a major free update, known as Cyberpunk 2.0, which reconfigured several of the game's mechanics in a favorable way, as well as the paid expansion Phantom Liberty, which received "generally favorable reviews" according to Metacritic.

=== Balan Wonderworld (2021) ===
Balan Wonderworld is a platform game co-developed by Balan Company (a subsidiary of Square Enix) and Arzest, and published by Square Enix, released in March 2021 for Windows, Nintendo Switch, PlayStation 4, PlayStation 5, Xbox One, and Xbox Series X/S. The development was led by veteran Sega developers Yuji Naka and Naoto Ohshima, who co-created the Sonic the Hedgehog franchise and worked on other critically acclaimed games like Nights into Dreams (1996) at Sonic Team in the 1990s. Prior to the game's release, Naka stated it was his "one chance" to make a platform game at Square Enix.

Initial impressions of Balan Wonderworld at its announcement in July 2020 were positive and led to anticipation. Reception turned negative when a demo was released in January 2021, with critics considering the themes weird and unclear, and the gameplay as lacking any depth. Square Enix created a day-one patch that attempted to address some complaints, though producer Noriyoshi Fujimoto stated it was too late to make major adjustments. Square Enix did not provide advance copies for critics, generally taken as a sign by the gaming press that the publisher has concerns about the state of the game.

Balan Wonderworld received strongly negative reviews. Critics panned the presentation, story, gameplay, controls, level design, and technical issues. An aspect of particular criticism was the decision to use a one-button control scheme, which reviewers decried as limiting and foolish, with some power-ups preventing the player character from being able to jump. Critics called the game outdated, with Chris Scullion of Video Games Chronicle likening it to an early-2000s PlayStation 2 platformer. Balan Wonderworld also attracted controversy as it shipped with a bug in the final boss that contained flashing lights, raising concerns about epileptic seizures; this caused Square Enix to warn players to install the patch before playing.

Balan Wonderworld was a commercial failure: it sold fewer than 2,100 copies in its opening week in Japan, and failed to make multiple sales charts. In April 2021, shortly after the game's release, Square Enix delisted the demo and Naka departed from Square Enix, announcing two months later that he was considering retirement. Kieran Harris of Gamereactor characterized Balan Wonderworld as a disastrous launch and "a pretty sad end to [Naka's] otherwise legendary career." Chris Carter of Destructoid wrote that the game's failure was sad, as he felt there was a lack of mascot platformers in the video game industry and that a high-profile one like Balan Wonderworld failing "can deter others from creating more". In 2022, Naka revealed that he filed a lawsuit against Square Enix after it fired him six months before Balan Wonderworld's release and published the game in an unfinished state. He criticized Square Enix and Arzest's decisions during the development and apologized to disappointed fans.

=== eFootball 2022 (2021) ===
eFootball 2022 is the first game in the eFootball football simulation video game series developed and published by Konami. It is a free-to-play rebranding of the long-running Pro Evolution Soccer series.

At launch, eFootball 2022 was panned by critics and players, who criticized the "atrocious" graphics, lack of content, laggy performance and finicky controls. With 92% negative reviews, it became the worst-rated game on Steam a day after launch, and the lowest-rated game of 2021 on the review aggregator Metacritic. Konami later apologised for the game's many issues and said they would work on improving it. Ahead of planned improvement patches in April 2022, Konami stated the game had been launched "incomplete" on release which they attributed to "a result of multiple factors including the transition to a new football game engine, the support of next generation consoles such as PS5 and Xbox Series X|S, the change of play style to free to play and furthermore, we tried to deliver new eFootball 2022 for players as soon as possible." Konami said they took the negative criticism of eFootball 2022 "very seriously" with regards to its planned upcoming improvements for the game.

=== Grand Theft Auto: The Trilogy – The Definitive Edition (2021) ===
Grand Theft Auto: The Trilogy – The Definitive Edition is a compilation of three action-adventure games in the Grand Theft Auto series: Grand Theft Auto III (2001), Grand Theft Auto: Vice City (2002), and Grand Theft Auto: San Andreas (2004). It was developed by Grove Street Games and published by Rockstar Games. All three games are remastered, with visual enhancements and gameplay upgrades supporting modern computers and consoles.

Beside intended visual improvements, Grove Street Games also converted the games to use Unreal Engine 4 instead of the original RenderWare when the games were first released. Prior to release, Rockstar removed the three individual games and the original compilation from sale on digital storefronts, intending the remaster to be the replacement for these titles. This was criticized by audiences and journalists, citing concerns with video game preservation, a lack of choice between versions, and the potential removal of music due to expired licences, which had occurred with previous re-releases. (Note: Attributed to multiple sources:) At release, the game had various visual and technical flaws, and while some improvements made to gameplay were appreciated, critics were generally disappointed with the treatment of these influential games by the remaster. (Note: Attributed to multiple sources:) The Definitive Edition received "mixed or average reviews" for PlayStation 5 and Xbox Series X/S, based on 44 and 11 reviews, respectively, and "generally unfavorable reviews" for Microsoft Windows and Nintendo Switch based on eight and twelve critics, according to Metacritic. It was the sixth lowest-scoring game on Metacritic in 2021; the Switch version specifically received the lowest score among the platforms with 47/100.

Further troubling its launch, the Rockstar Games Launcher went offline for a period of roughly 28 hours for "maintenance" following the game's launch, rendering the game unplayable and unpurchaseable on Windows; the game remained unavailable after the launcher was restored, while Rockstar "remove[d] files unintentionally included" in the game. Based on information discovered by data miners, it was suggested that those files included the removed radio station songs, hidden notes from the developers, and San Andreas's controversial Hot Coffee minigame. Following three days of unavailability, the Windows version was restored on November 14.

The game was the subject of review bombing on Metacritic, resulting in a user review score of 0.4/10 at its nadir, among the lowest on the site. Reporters noted that some user reviews cited a dislike of the game's art style and the lack of advance copies sent to press, with several demanding refunds. Journalists noted a general backlash from players due to the unusual look of some updated character models, textual errors on in-game surfaces, issues related to draw distance increase, and model and physics glitches. On November 19, 2021, Rockstar apologized for the technical problems, admitting that the games "did not launch in a state that meets our own standards of quality, or the standards our fans have come to expect" and said it would work to fix and improve the game through updates. The same day, they announced that the original versions of the games would be released as a bundle on the Rockstar Store; they were delivered for free to owners of The Definitive Edition on December 3, and remained available with all purchases of the game until June 30, 2022. Additionally, customers who bought The Definitive Edition through the Rockstar Games Launcher were eligible to receive one free Rockstar game.

In November 2024, Rockstar released a major patch that added "classic lighting" to the games, which is toggled by default. Grove Street Games was also removed from the opening credits. Finally, the update fixes many of the bugs seen in its original release. After its launch, Rockstar's official support page acknowledges that the game still contains bugs, and will release another patch to address them.

=== Battlefield 2042 (2021) ===
Battlefield 2042 is a first-person shooter game and the twelfth main installment in the Battlefield series. It was developed by DICE and published by Electronic Arts.

Initial impressions of Battlefield 2042 were positive since its announcement on June 9, 2021, and anticipation was high to the point that the player count for previous Battlefield titles jumped. Opinions began to sour over the coming months when DICE announced multiple changes from the standard Battlefield formula, including the removal of a single-player campaign, and replacing the series staple class system with a "Specialist" system more akin to currently existing games. Concerns continued to mount when the open beta began on October 6, 2021, citing multiple bugs, glitches, and connectivity issues.

The game received negative reviews from players at launch. Criticism focused on bugs, certain changes to gameplay, and a removal of features included in older Battlefield games. It became one of the worst-reviewed games on Steam, with player numbers rapidly decreasing over time. Online harassment and abuse from players ensued after EA's global director of integrated communications, Andy McNamara, called their expectations "brutal", leading to moderators threatening to close the game's official subreddit. A Change.org petition advocating for all buyers of Battlefield 2042 to be refunded reached more than 200,000 signatures in a month. (Note: Attributed to multiple sources:) In April 2022, DICE released an update which brought over 400 changes to the game, including bug fixes and improvements to game balancing. The following month, DICE announced Battlefield 2042's first season of content, which would introduce various changes to the game, new items, and a focus on smaller player-counts.

=== Babylon's Fall (2022) ===
Babylon's Fall, an action role-playing game developed by PlatinumGames and published by Square Enix, was panned for its confusing gameplay and arena format as well as its outdated visuals. It received "generally unfavorable" reviews according to Metacritic. Metacritic listed Babylon's Fall as the third-worst game of 2022. On launch, the game only reached a concurrent player count of less than 1,200 on release day and declined sharply afterwards to the point where there was only one player left playing the game. The servers for the game were officially shut down in February 2023, as was initially announced in September 2022 by Square Enix.

=== The Lord of the Rings: Gollum (2023) ===
The Lord of the Rings: Gollum is an action-adventure game developed by Daedalic Entertainment, who co-published the game with Nacon. The game takes place in the fictional world of Middle-earth created by J. R. R. Tolkien, where the player controls Gollum from a third-person perspective where stealth is heavily utilized.

At release in May 2023, The Lord of the Rings: Gollum received "generally unfavorable reviews", according to Metacritic. At its release, it was one of the lowest-rated games in 2023. Particular criticisms were given for the game's premise, having the player control Gollum, and also for the game's graphics, sluggish gameplay, technical issues, stability, and pacing. Some video game review publication sites, especially Digital Trends, were unable to initially score the game due to persistent crashes, and had to wait for a day-one patch that still failed to address the many persistent issues that plagued the game. Daedalic publicly apologized to players shortly after release, stating that the game "did not meet the expectations we set for ourselves", and that "we would like to sincerely apologise for the underwhelming experience many of you have had" with the game.

Following release, Daedalic had been reported to be working on another Middle-earth title. At the end of June 2023, Daedalic announced that the company was leaving game development to solely focus on publishing, cancelling the second Middle-earth game. Daedalic employees stated in a later report that the game's development was hampered by their own limited experience in genres other than point-and-click adventure games, the limited budget (about the tenth of the cost of a triple-A game) that made it difficult to hire the right talent, and management's practices including forced crunch.

=== The Day Before (2023) ===
The Day Before was announced by developer Fntastic in January 2021 as a new take on "the MMO survival genre" game set in a zombie apocalypse, with initial gameplay footage demonstrating these elements. Additional videos continued to showcase these features, including the release date announcement trailer in October 2021, targeting release in June 2022. In May 2022, Fntastic decided to delay the game by a year as to switch to Unreal Engine 5, and began asking for volunteers to help test the game. This sequence of events fueled hype for the game, such that by July 2022, it ranked among the most wishlisted games on Steam. By January 2023, new trailers for the game led to questions about changes in the game's approach. In addition, Fntastic claimed that there had been trademark issues surrounding the game's title, and pushed the release out another seven months as to resolve this.

By November 2023, Fntastic claimed they had resolved all the issues, and planned an early access release of the game in December 2023 while delaying planned console versions until after the early access period was completed. Once the early access version was released, players reported numerous bugs and technical glitches; the gameplay no longer matched what was initially shown, and instead resembled an extraction shooter. The game lost 90% of its players within four days of release and became one of the most negatively-reviewed games on Steam, while the few media outlets that reviewed it rated it very low, with IGN scoring it 1 out of 10. It would become IGN's lowest rated game in 2023, being the only game to be scored a "1" that year.

The game was pulled from sale five days after it launched, and Fntastic announced that they were shutting down, as poor sales of the game would not be sufficient to pay back immediate debt they had. Fntastic would close the servers for the game in January 2024, only 45 days after first release, and their publisher provided refunds to all buyers. Those that had followed the game brought up the question of whether the endeavour was a scam by Fntastic. Interviews from Fntastic developers after the game's servers were closed indicated that a harsh development environment was kept at the studio, and the game suffered from frequent changes-of-whim, based on what other games were popular at different stages of development, by the studio's founders who had since vanished following the release.

=== MindsEye (2025) ===
MindsEye was developed by Build a Rocket Boy (BARB), a studio created by former Rockstar Games developer Leslie Benzies, who had been a major figure in the Grand Theft Auto (GTA) series. The studio had been set up in 2016, and by 2024 had two additional locations in addition to its main Leith, Edinburgh, Scotland, studio, with nearly 450 employees and over £233 million in investments. At the start, the studio had started working on Everywhere, a multiplayer, open-ended role-playing game, but as of 2025, it had not been released, with BARB staffers saying Benzies did not give any direction towards the game's end goals. Due to the lack of product, BARB posted multiple years of losses. To try to make revenue, Benzies had the studio start work on the action-adventure game MindsEye around 2023, which initially was planned as an experience within Everywhere. Though senior management was focused on pushing MindsEye to release, employees said that the management made knee-jerk decisions on the direction the game should take, ignored suggestions from the developers, and made immediate demands of the developers that were to take priority over any other task, which the employees named "Leslie tickets" due to their frequency. With the game's release set for June 2025 through IO Interactive, the studio also forced crunch on the staff from February to May 2025 to assure the game was in a state for release.

No pre-release copies were sent out for the reviewers. By release, the game was critically panned, receiving a Metacritic aggregate scores between 28 and 37 out of 100 across various platforms. Many reviewers described the game and world as dull and lifeless, with one reviewer stating the missions were a "reminder of the worst GTA missions". Numerous bugs were found with the game, requiring BARB to spend the first two weeks after release pushing out hot-fixes. Many players requested refunds for the game, which both Steam and PlayStation users received even if they had exceeded the normal two-hour playtime window allowed for refunds. BARB co-CEO Mark Gerhard claimed that external forces were responsible for engineering a campaign against the game, though this was dismissed by IO Interactive CEO Hakan Abrak.

Management sent 300 employees notices of potential redundancies in July 2025, and by October 2025, between 250 and 300 of the BARB staff were let go, primarily from the Edinburgh studio. Nearly 100 workers represented by the Independent Workers' Union of Great Britain asserted that BARB management mishandled the layoffs and had created a toxic workplace. BARB management claimed they approached the layoffs appropriately, but did state that due to a combination of "internal and external" forces, "Leslie and the entire senior management team take full responsibility for the initial launch [of MindsEye]. The version of the game that was released did not reflect the experience our community deserved." By September 2026, BARB announced the studio's closure.

== See also ==
- List of best-selling video games
- List of commercial failures in video games
- List of video games considered the best
- List of controversial video games
- Video game controversies
