= Fighter Within =

2013 video game

- Developer: Daoka
- Publisher: Ubisoft
- Composer: Winifred Phillips
- Platform: Xbox One
- Release: November 22, 2013
- Genre: Fighting
- Mode: Single-player

Fighter Within is a Kinect-based fighting game developed by Belgian studio Daoka and published by Ubisoft. It was released on November 22, 2013 as an exclusive launch title for the Xbox One and a sequel to Fighters Uncaged (2010).

Fighter Within is panned by critics, with many considering it to be one of the worst video games of all time. X-One Magazine referred to it as one of the worst games in general.

== Reception ==
Reception

Aggregate score
Aggregator	Score
Metacritic	23/100

Review scores
Publication	Score
Destructoid	3/10
Edge	2/10
Electronic Gaming Monthly	2.5/10
Eurogamer	1/10
Game Informer	1/10
GameRevolution	2/10
GameSpot	2/10
GamesRadar+	2/5
GameZone	2.5/10
Hardcore Gamer	1.5/5
IGN	2.7/10
Official Xbox Magazine (US)	2/10
Polygon	2/10
The Digital Fix	1/10
Digital Spy	1/5

Fighter Within received "generally unfavorable reviews" according to the review aggregation website Metacritic. It became notable for its negative reception. The Kinect controls were criticized, with several reviews suggesting problems were just as prevalent as the Kinect for Xbox 360. Game Informer said, "Fighter Within is garbage." GameZone's Mike Splechta said, "Fighter Within really showcases the larger problem with Kinect only games: they just don't work." IGN said that the game was only able to adequately detect basic punches, describing the game as a "disjointed", "haphazard mess" due to its unpredictable motion detection, and considered its storyline to be "laughably bad" and a "flimsy excuse" to "fight [against] a long stream of AI opponents who look just as dumb as they fight." GameSpot described its gameplay as requiring players to "stand like a lemon in front of the TV for what seems like an eternity as you feel your life ebb away during the excruciatingly long loading times; punch at thin air as fast as humanly possible until you trigger a combo; watch the lifeless combo animation; repeat these steps until your opponent is defeated."

Digital Spy gave the game a score of one star out of five, saying, "Perhaps as a tech demo and nothing more, Fighter Within would have raised a smile, but as a full-priced, next-generation it really isn't worth the time or money." Metro similarly gave it a score of two out of ten, calling it "A bad game and a very poor start for next generation Kinect games, even if there is still some small cause for optimism beneath the bland fighting action." The Digital Fix gave it a score of one out of ten, saying, "Fighter Within on the Xbox 360 would be a disaster reduced to a footnote, ignored and left to wither. As a launch title for the new generation it's worse: a parasite, feeding off the goodwill and desperation of early-adopters. Avoid, avoid, avoid."

== See also ==
- Fighters Uncaged
- List of video games notable for negative reception
