= Hoshi Wo Miru Hito =

1987 video game

- Developer: Another
- Publisher: HOT-B
- Platform: Family Computer
- Release: JP: October 27, 1987
- Genre: Role-playing game

Hoshi Wo Miru Hito (Note: Japanese: 星をみるひと, Hepburn: Hoshi Wo Miru Hito; "Stargazer") is a 1987 role-playing video game developed by Another and published by HOT-B for the Family Computer. It is based on the 1984 video game Psychic City. The game is a science fiction RPG where players use psychic powers to fight enemies.

Reviewers noted the often confusing and highly difficult gameplay, leading to the game being considered one of the worst video games ever made. Japanese gamers have dubbed it "Densetsu no Kusoge" (伝説のクソゲー, lit. '"Legendary Shitty Game').

== Development ==
The game is developed by game developer Another and is based on the earlier 1984 cyberpunk-themed computer role-playing game Psychic City, a 1984 PC-8801 role-playing game set in New York where everyone had psychic powers.

The game's copyright is owned by City Connection Co., Ltd. as of 2016.

== Story ==
The game is set in a cyberpunk-style future world in which the supercomputer Crew III has brainwashed Earth's population into driving themselves to extinction. The only ones who can resist Crew III are those with extrasensory perception, whom Crew III has sent a team of bounty hunters to wipe out. By the time the game begins, only four psychics --- who, incidentally, are the four player characters --- are known to remain: the children Minami, Shiba, Misa, and Aine. The four must journey to Ark City, and eventually, outer space, in order to defeat Crew III.

In the end, however, the party learns that Crew III didn't exist; rather, the humans were being brainwashed by a race of sapient dolphins who, depending on the player's choices, want to either annihilate or befriend the human race.

== Gameplay ==
Hoshi wo Miru Hito is a science fiction RPG infamous for its difficult gameplay and elements that make the game confusing and cryptic. For example, at the beginning of the game, the player is put into the field map without any explanation on any goals, and the entrance to the first town the player needs to visit is not displayed on the field map at all. There is no "escape" command; the player needs to learn a specific ESP skill by levelling up in order to escape from battles.

In the early part of the game, there is only a single way to restore health, which is a single spot within the first town.

Game over occurs when all the players characters reach zero hit points. Early in the game, it is easy to die due to poor balancing, powerful enemies, and inability to escape from battles, but later in the game the player's characters become strong enough that it is difficult to kill the entire party.

== Release ==
The game was published on October 27, 1987, for the Famicom home console, and published by HOT-B. The game was only released in Japan. In 2004, a free fan game remake was created, titled STARGAZER.

In February 2013, the soundtrack was released on the CD Rom Cassette Disc In HOT-B. The four disc album is a compilation of music from HOT-B's games. The soundtrack was released by City Connection through the "Claris Disk" label. In October 2015, the album was made available for download.

City Connection published the game for the Nintendo Switch, developed by Empty Clip Studios using the Arsenal emulation software engine. It was released in Japan on July 30, 2020 but was never released elsewhere.

== Reception ==
Reviewers complained about the balance of the game's systems but praised the science fiction scenario. Due to these issues, the game has been listed as a Kusoge game.

Upon release, in the "Cross Review" section of Weekly Famitsu, four reviewers gave it a scores of 4, 5, 6, 4 for a total of 19 out of 40. Readers of Family Computer Magazine voted to score the game 16.08 out of 30 points.

The 2016 mook Nostalgic Famicom Perfect Guide ranked the game as #5 for in its "Impossible Game Ranking" of Famicom games. It suggested the game was impossible without a strategy guide, and when facing the strongest enemies in the game will lead to complete destruction of the player and there's little the player can do to prevent this.
