= Fighters Uncaged =

2010 video game

- Developer(s): AMA Studios
- Publisher(s): Ubisoft
- Platform(s): Xbox 360
- Release: NA: November 4, 2010; EU: November 10, 2010; AU: November 18, 2010
- Genre(s): Fighting
- Mode(s): Single-player

Fighters Uncaged is a fighting video game for the Xbox 360 Kinect system. It was developed by AMA Studios and published by Ubisoft in November 2010. Fighters Uncaged was one of the first twelve games released for the Kinect. The game has the player control Simon, a man who is attempting to win an illegal fighting tournament to help get his father out of trouble with a crime lord. It has one game mode and features many different fighting moves and different settings and opponents. Simon is able to go up in leagues by obtaining certain numbers of points, which in turn unlock more scenarios and opponents. Following its release, Zuffa filed a lawsuit against Ubisoft for the usage of a trademarked term. Fighters Uncaged received poor reviews from critics, with many criticizing the tutorial and visuals, and citing its motion control system as the biggest issue they had with the game, which many considered to be broken.

== Gameplay ==
Screenshot of the gameplay in Fighters Uncaged

Fighters Uncaged is a single-player-only fighting game controlled using the Kinect, a motion sensing input device. The player controls the protagonist of the game, Simon, through his attempts to win an illegal fighting tournament to help get his father out of trouble with a crime lord. The game features one gamemode called "Fight" which is only accessible after completing the tutorial. Fighters Uncaged is played in an over-the-shoulder perspective, with the opponent being on the opposite side. Simon is able to do a range of different actions, including short and long punches, kicks, blocks, dodges, and headbutts. The player can execute special moves via shouting in the direction of the Kinect, once the corresponding bar is full. Fighting consists of looking for telegraphs in the movements of one's opponents to figure out when to dodge or block attacks, then hitting them while they are vulnerable. In the early stages of Fighters Uncaged, it is made less difficult to read the telegraphs of the opponent, but as the player progresses, they become increasingly imperceptible. The moves Simon can complete depend on where the opponent is at the time, and therefore only certain moves will land hits at particular moments. Fighters Uncaged features different leagues, with higher leagues being reached by having a certain number of points. Points are obtained by defeating the opponent, while having a good score. Good scores are attained by accomplishing counterattacks, exploiting the enemies' weak spots, and correctly completing combos. If a good score is not secured at the end of the fight, no points are rewarded.

== Development and release ==
Fighters Uncaged was announced by Ubisoft at Gamescom 2010, three months before its official release. There, people were allowed to preview the game. The game was developed by AMA Studios and published by Ubisoft exclusively for the Xbox 360 Kinect. Because the announcement came suddenly and close to the release date, video game journalists such as Christopher Grant of Engadget and Jamin Smith of VideoGamer.com were not intrigued. Grant was unimpressed by the game's announcement, criticizing the concept and its character designs and noted a misspelling in the preview. The game was originally planned to feature a multiplayer mode, though this was cut later on in development.

The game was released in November 2010, and was one of the twelve games released on day one of the Kinect's launch. In December, Ultimate Fighting Championship's parent company Zuffa filed a lawsuit against Ubisoft based on the usage of the phrase "ULTIMATE FIGHTING", a term which Zuffa had trademarked, on the back of the game's box. Zuffa claimed that the "use of the ULTIMATE FIGHTING name and mark is identical or confusingly similar to the use of the UFC marks, including the ULTIMATE FIGHTING name". Zuffa wanted Ubisoft to be prevented from using the term in the future as well as having all uses of it destroyed, and sought all of Ubisoft's profits off the game, along with triple the normal fees for trademark violation. Zuffa also wanted Ubisoft to pay for their attorneys, exemplary damages and compensatory damages. Ubisoft did not publicly comment on the issue.

== Reception ==
Reception

Aggregate score
Aggregator	Score
Metacritic	32/100

Review scores
Publication	Score
Edge	3/10
Eurogamer	2/10
Famitsu	(X360) 27/40; 24/40
Game Informer	4.5/10
GameRevolution	D
GameSpot	2/10
GameTrailers	4.4/10
GameZone	2.5/10
IGN	3/10
Official Xbox Magazine (US)	6/10
The Telegraph	1/10
Metro	1/10

The game received "unfavorable" reviews according to the review aggregation website Metacritic. In Japan, where the game was ported and published by Microsoft Game Studios on May 26, 2011, Famitsu gave it a score of 24 out of 40, while Famitsu X360 gave it a score of three sevens and one six for a total of 27 out of 40.

The tutorial was criticized by reviewers for different reasons. Tom Hoggins of The Daily Telegraph described the tutorial as being "mind-numbing". David Jenkins of Metro wrote that the tutorial was the most notable part of the game, though ultimately nonessential. He wrote that because of its length it may have been an "attempt to protect [the player] from the awful reality of the real game". Ellie Gibson of Eurogamer described it as being "the most boring tutorial sequence in the history of the world". Jamin Smith of VideoGamer.com criticized the tutorial for "insisting on explaining each and every move in the game before forcing you to repeat it three times".

Critics believed that the motion control system in Fighters Uncaged did not work and that the fighting mechanic was poorly made. Mark Walton of GameSpot wrote that he found it to be "immensely frustrating", saying that the controls were "simply broken". Smith compared the combat to that of the luck in rock, paper, scissors, noting that "90% of the time" the attack will be avoided or blocked, while for the other 10%, the character "just stands there like a lemon, refusing to acknowledge the command". Jack DeVries thought that when in a fight, the moves become a "series of desperate flails" in an attempt for the game to notice the player's actions.

The visuals were disliked by reviewers, with Smith saying the game was "plagued with bizarre design choices and lacklustre visuals" and attributed this to the rush of the development. Walton wrote that the game was a good example for how to not make fighting games for the Kinect, continuing on to say that the presentation was sub-par. Gibson believed that "everything about this game is incorrect". She said that her enthusiasm for the game diminished with the intro movie, and criticized the "static images of ugly men with stupid names rolling across the screen". DeVries described the game as being rushed, hence the static and unflattering visuals.

== See also ==
- The Fight: Lights Out
- Fighter Within, the game's successor
