= Licensed game =

Video game adaptation

A licensed game is a video game developed as a tie-in for a franchise in a different media format, such as a book, film or television show. Like other types of tie-ins, they are generally intended as a form of cross-promotion in order to generate additional revenue and visibility. The poor quality of licensed games, which were rushed to meet unrealistic deadlines, nearly caused the collapse of the video game industry during the video game crash of 1983, and they have historically been regarded as inferior to original IPs. Nevertheless, there are numerous examples of well-regarded licensed games, and the rise of video games as a cultural force in their own right have resulted in tie-in titles of significantly higher production values and quality.

== History ==
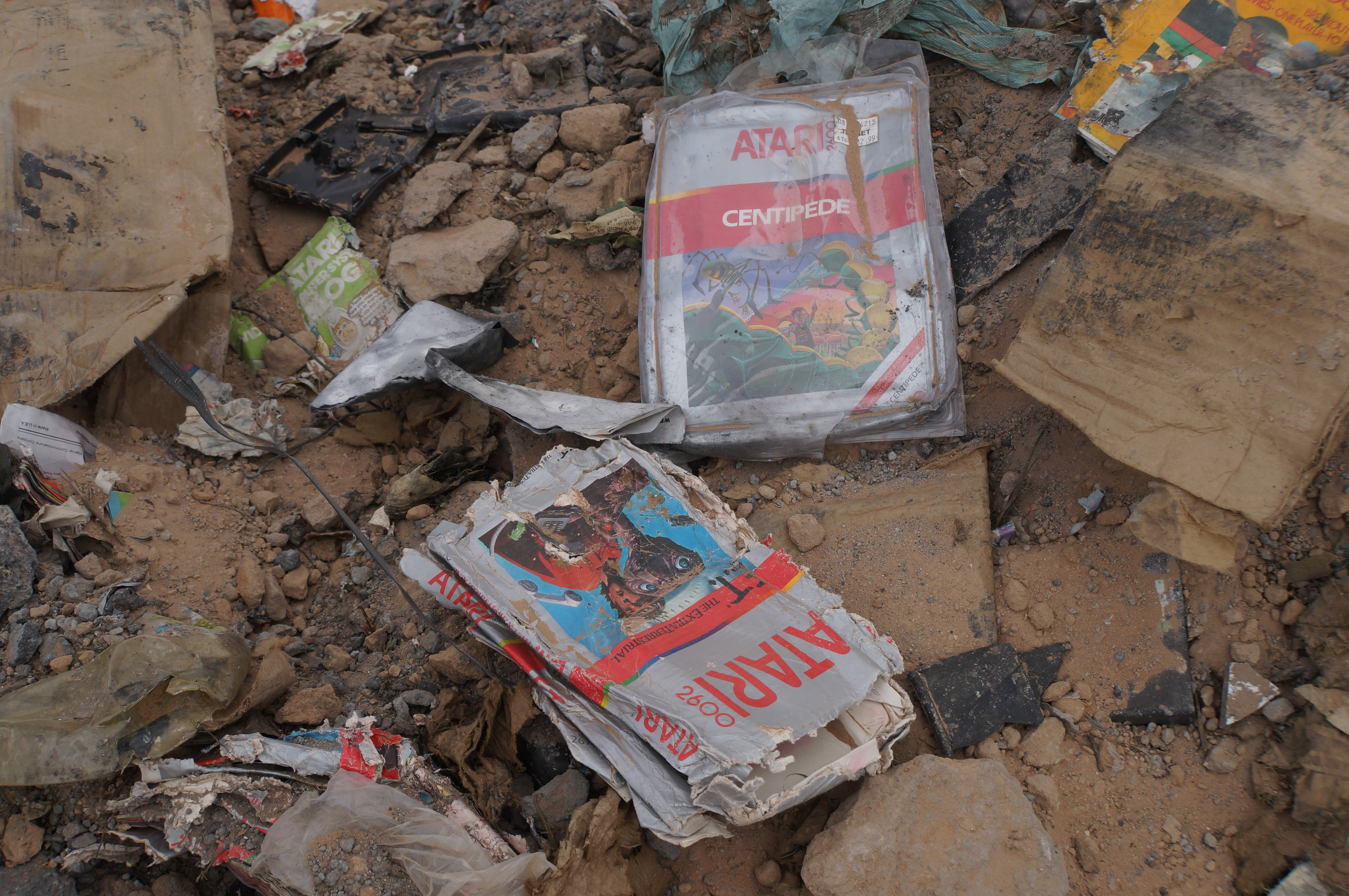
E.T. the Extra-Terrestrial (1982), a licensed game and notorious commercial failure, was one of numerous games in the Atari video game burial.

Licensed games were common since the very start of the video game industry, but were rarely a hallmark of a high-quality product. Atari's Shark Jaws was possibly the first tie-in video game to a film, Jaws, however because Nolan Bushnell was unable to secure an official license from Universal Pictures, the game was not fully titled after the film and was an unofficial tie-in game based on the film. For decades, games based on a non-sports-related license were poor commercial performers, and many, such as Superman 64, were considered some of the worst games of all time. Most of the licenses were movie licenses, tied to big-budget films that were due to release in a much shorter time than a quality video game needed to develop, causing the game's development to be rushed to meet the film's release, and resulting in numerous bugs and glitches in the final product. Notably, the 1982 E.T. the Extra-Terrestrial was rushed to release in five weeks to meet the Christmas shopping season, becoming one of the largest commercial failures ever and causing the downfall of Atari. Atari's failure triggered the video game crash of 1983, until the Nintendo Entertainment System revitalized the industry. Alternatively, the game released long after the movie and was unable to profit from the movie's release hype, also causing poor sales.

Initially, studios refused to divulge many details about their films to game developers, even going so far as to prevent them from reading the script more than once. Studios interfered heavily with a game's development, such as requesting numerous minor changes to appease actors. Over time, communication increased between movie studios and game developers. Studios send over clips and plot outlines to ensure the game meshes properly with the film it is based on, as well as allowing developers to use the same actors and soundtrack. Studios became less worried about matching a game's release date to a certain film's as brand strategies became larger in scope, more about keeping a franchise front-of-mind for audiences, allowing developers to work at their own pace, usually slower than a film's.

In the modern day, fewer AAA games are licensed titles, and the industry shifted towards creating original IP. Licensed games are more commonly on mobile platforms and oriented towards a casual audience, with a low development budget and time. Games created in months can more easily meet the deadlines for a movie marketing campaign. Genres such as idle games are simple to play for a wide array of fans, resulting in high revenue.

Some indie games have also started becoming licensed tie-ins. Examples include John Wick Hex, a turn-based strategy game developed by Mike Bithell after he pitched the idea to Lionsgate.

== Notable examples ==
DuckTales, a 1989 platformer and one of Disney's earliest licensed games, received critical renown for its unique gameplay, and is known as one of the best NES games. Aspects lauded by fans include its pogo stick ability, non-linearity, and its soundtrack, composed by Capcom's Yoshihiro Sakaguchi, including its well-known Moon theme.

GoldenEye 007, a 1997 Nintendo 64 first-person shooter based on the film of the same name, is considered one of the best video games of all time, and marked a significant change in the genre towards more cinematic games. It used open level design based on exact blueprints and photos of the film sets, allowing players to explore the film's spaces at their own leisure. Allowing players to "inhabit" the role of James Bond and complete levels using their own gameplay style, it let them control an expanded version of the movie. The A.V. Club called it an "anomaly" in an "era when licensed games were almost universally terrible".

The Batman: Arkham action-adventure series, beginning in 2009 with Arkham Asylum, attained commercial success, with the 2011 Arkham City becoming the single most critically acclaimed superhero game, also being declared the best licensed game ever made by Game Informer upon its release. Particular aspects that were singled out by reviewers include the games' combat against multiple enemies, Batman's ability to glide through the game's world, and its Detective Vision system.

The Walking Dead, a 2012 episodic adventure game series by Telltale Games, told a standalone story in the established fictional world of The Walking Dead. It was praised for its emphasis on player choice and its more story-driven gameplay than a typical zombie game, achieving widespread commercial success and becoming a widely cited example of successful transmedia storytelling, despite the company's later collapse.

== See also ==
- List of video games based on films
- List of video games based on anime or manga
- List of video games based on comics
