= Advanced Mobile Applications =

Software company

AMA Corporation plc
- Company type: Public
- Traded as: ALAMA
- Industry: Software development
- Founded: 2004
- Headquarters: Rennes, France
- Key people: Christian Guillemot (Chairman and CEO)
- Owner: Guillemot family

Advanced Mobile Applications, also known as AMA Studios or simply AMA, is an international software developer founded in 2004 by Christian Guillemot. It is a sister company of Ubisoft and Gameloft.

In 2017, video game studio Playwing was created by AMA.

== History ==
The company was founded on 21 January 2004 in London by Christian Guillemot. In 2005 AMA released its first JAVA products, mainly life-style applications.

Between 2006 and 2008, AMA negotiated contracts with carriers in more than 40 countries.

In 2012, the Stars vs Paparazzi and Panic Flight games reached one million downloads. That year, during the Google IO, AMA became a member of the new Google program the «Explorer».

During Gamescom 2013, AMA introduced its first "Google Glass" game. After that, the French surgeon Dr. Philippe Collin invited AMA's team to make video conferencing tests and see what this kind of solution could bring to his discipline.

On 14 February 2014 the company managed the World Premiere of live retransmission of surgery between France (Dr. Collin, CHP Saint-Grégoire, Rennes) and Japan (Dr. Goto, Nagoya).

On 21 October 2014, Google chose AMA as a "Google Glass at Work Partner".

In 2015, AMA launched Xpert Eye P1, its mobile videoconference solution based on smartglasses. Today AMA has about 50 employees in offices all around the world:

- Rennes (France)
- Boston (USA)
- London (UK)
- Bucharest (Romania)
- Cologne (Germany)

In January 2016, AMA unveiled Xpert Eye Mobility M1 as well as its "VAR" (Value Added Resellers) partnership with ODG (Osterhout Design Group) during the Consumer Electronics Show (CES) in Las Vegas.

in 2017, AMA opened its subsidiaries in Germany and United Kingdom.
