= Ninjabread Man =

2005 video game

- North American boxart, Wii version
- Developer: Data Design Interactive
- Publishers: EU: Metro3D Europe (PlayStation 2/Windows); EU: Data Design Interactive (Wii); NA: Conspiracy Entertainment
- Engine: RenderWare, GODS Engine, Havok
- Platforms: Wii, PlayStation 2, Microsoft Windows
- Release: PlayStation 2; EU: 13 July 2005; Microsoft Windows; EU: 23 July 2005; Wii; EU: 21 September 2007; AU: 27 September 2007; NA: 3 October 2007
- Genres: Platform, action-adventure
- Mode: Single-player

Ninjabread Man is a 2005 platform game developed and published by Data Design Interactive for the PlayStation 2 and Microsoft Windows. A port for the Wii was released in September 2007 in Europe and Australia, and on 3 October 2007 in North America. Ninjabread Man was later published as part of Data Design Interactive's 'Popcorn Arcade' brand of Wii games.

Upon release, Ninjabread Man received universally negative reviews from critics and was criticized for its camera system, graphics, lack of story, short length, and controls; the Wii version received even lower reviews for its use of motion controls and has been listed as one of the worst games of all time.

== Gameplay ==
An upwards motion on the Nunchuk or press of the Z Button allows the player to jump.

Ninjabread Man is an action-adventure platformer. There are three levels in the game, plus a tutorial level. In order to proceed to the next level, players must collect eight power rods to activate a teleporter. The Ninjabread Man can attack enemies directly with a samurai sword via a shake of the Wii Remote, as well as throw shurikens from a distance using the Wii Remote's infrared functionality to aim. When the player completes a level and plays it again, a menu appears with a second mode available, 'Score Pickups'. If the level is completed again in this mode, the player will unlock 'Time Attack' mode. Completion of this mode unlocks the 'Hidden Pickups!' mode, in which the player must find pickups.

== Development ==
Ninjabread Man reportedly started development as a planned third entry in the Zool series, a 2D platforming series released for the Amiga. Not much is known about the pitch, though it is believed that Zoo Digital Publishing (Zool's rights owners) weren't impressed by the tech demo and pulled the license. As such, DDI released the game as a standalone original game. Despite this, evidence for the game originally being a Zool game are still present; such as leftover Zool-themed levels and items, and a since-leaked intro that shows Zool crashing onto a planet that closely resembles the one used in the game. The data indicates that each of the other four games DDI made with the same assets were originally worlds in the Zool demo, with Ninjabread Man being Sweet World, Rock 'n' Roll Adventures being Music World, Myth Makers: Trixie in Toyland being Toy World, and Anubis II being Tooting Common from Zool 2.

The game was first announced in November 2004 as Myth Makers: The Ninjabread Man, originally intended to be part of the company's Myth Makers series before having the suffix removed during release. A PlayStation Portable version was listed in Metro3D's 2005 product portfolio, but such a version never materialised.

On 27 April 2007, Data Design Interactive announced that they had gained a publishing and developer status from Nintendo to release games for the Wii. With this, DDI announced that they would port their titles to the system, including Ninjabread Man which would be one of six titles available as part of a lineup of budget titles. In April, DDI announced that they would self-publish the games. In June, it was announced that Ninjabread Man was the first of the planned thirty titles to go gold while Conspiracy Entertainment announced that they would publish the game and select others in North America and Asia. In August 2007, DDI secured Koch Media as their UK distributor and announced that the title would release in the United Kingdom in September alongside three other titles.

== Reception ==
Reception

Aggregate scores
Aggregator	Score
GameRankings	31% (PS2); 17.5% (Wii)
Metacritic	20/100 (Wii)

Review scores
Publication	Score
Eurogamer	1/10 (Wii)
IGN	1.5/10 (Wii)
Jeuxvideo.com	5/20 (Wii)
Nintendo Life	2/10 (Wii)
Thunderbolt	1/10

Ninjabread Man received unanimously negative reviews upon release. The PlayStation 2 version of the game has a 31% average rating on GameRankings, while the Wii version has an average of 17.5%. On Metacritic, the Wii version of the game has an average score of 20/100, based on 6 reviews. The PC version of the game was not reviewed by any major publication.

IGN gave the Wii version a score of 1.5/10, saying: "It's buggy, often completely broken, somehow manages to have frame issues in tiny levels, and is completely ruthless if (and when) younger players die." Thunderbolt gave it 1/10, criticizing the game's length and the unimaginative use of the character as key flaws.

== Cancelled sequel ==
On 23 January 2008, a sequel titled Ninjabread Man – Blades of Fury was announced. It was never released, and Data Design Interactive went out of business in 2012.

== Rock 'n' Roll Adventures ==
Rock 'n' Roll Adventures
- Developer: Data Design Interactive
- Publishers: EU: Data Design Interactive; NA: Conspiracy Entertainment
- Engine: GODS Engine, Havok, RenderWare
- Platforms: PlayStation 2, Wii, Windows
- Release: 17 September 2007: Wii; EU: 17 September 2007; NA: 11 October 2007 PlayStation 2; EU: 2007 Windows; EU: 2007
- Genre: Platform
- Mode: Single-player

Rock 'n' Roll Adventures is a platform video game developed and published by Data Design Interactive and Conspiracy Entertainment. The game was released in Europe on Microsoft Windows, PlayStation 2, and Wii on 17 September 2007 and in North America on 11 October 2007. The game is considered an asset flip of Ninjabread Man.

=== Gameplay ===
Like Ninjabread Man, there are three levels, plus a tutorial. In the tutorial level, the game will show the player what controls to use. For the rest of the levels, the player must collect all eight Power Rods. The enemies of the game are drum parts like cymbals.

The game uses the Wii Remote and Nunchuk. Flicking the Nunchuk upwards allows the player to jump. Swinging the Wii Remote swings the player's guitar.

=== Reception ===
The game has been poorly received. IGN gave the game a 3.0/10, criticizing it for non-interesting graphics, sloppy gameplay, recycled content from Ninjabread Man, and bad controls.

== See also ==
- Anubis II, a similar Data Design Interactive game
- List of video games notable for negative reception
