= Anubis II =

2005 video game

- North American Wii cover art
- Developer: Data Design Interactive
- Publishers: Europe; Metro3D Europe (PlayStation 2 and PC); Data Design Interactive (Wii); North America; Conspiracy Entertainment
- Programmer: Adrian Fox
- Artist: Michael Rooker
- Platforms: Wii, PlayStation 2, Microsoft Windows
- Release: PS2: EU: 14 July 2005; Windows: EU: July 2005; Wii: EU: 21 September 2007; NA: 25 September 2007
- Genre: Platform
- Mode: Single-player

Anubis II (Note: A predecessor with involvement from either the developer or publisher does not exist. Otherwise, the title is pronounced Anubis the Second.) is a 2005 platform game by British developer Data Design Interactive. It was published by Conspiracy Entertainment in the United States for the Wii, PlayStation 2 and Microsoft Windows.

Anubis II received negative reviews from critics for being a copy of Ninjabread Man due to its identical music, gameplay, level layout and glitches.

== Gameplay ==
Set in ancient Egypt, the player controls Anubis, the guardian of the Underworld, in his quest to lift the curse of the pharaohs. The nunchuk controls Anubis while the Wii Remote swings the scepter of Ra and throws Canopic Bombs.

== Reception ==
Reception

Aggregate score
Aggregator	Score
Metacritic	19/100

Review scores
Publication	Score
GameSpot	1.5/10
IGN	2/10

Anubis II received overwhelmingly negative reviews, and holds a rating of 19/100 on review aggregate site Metacritic. It received a 1.5/10 rating from GameSpot and a 2/10 rating from IGN. The Wii version of Anubis II was nominated for Flat-Out Worst Game of 2007 by GameSpot. Critics have called it a carbon copy of Ninjabread Man, due to the identical music, gameplay and level layout, the same basic attacks, and enemies (as well as having most of the same bugs and glitches).

== See also ==
- Ninjabread Man, a similar Data Design Interactive game
