= Atari video game burial =

1983 burial of unsold video games

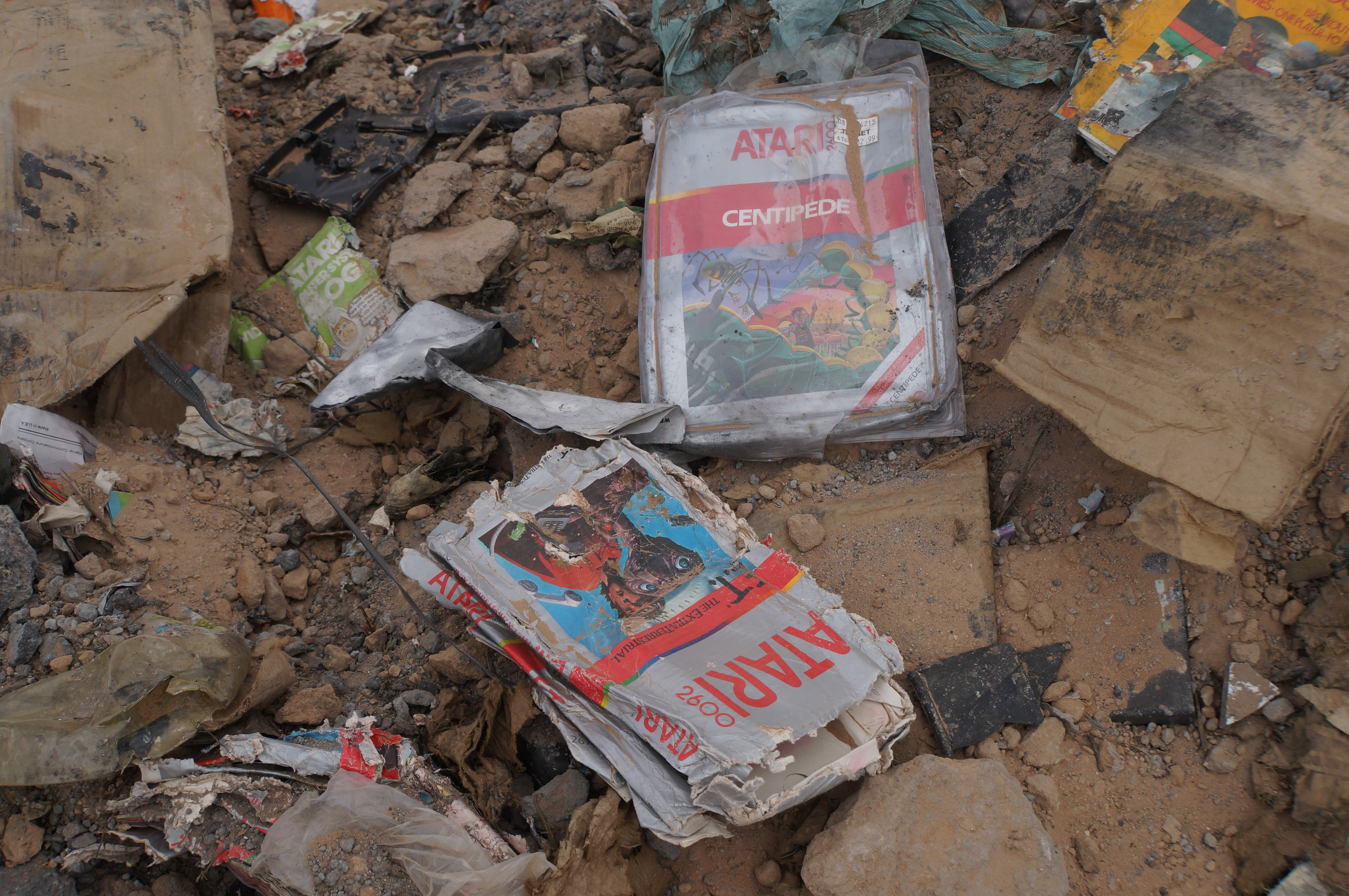
- E.T. and Centipede games packaging from the excavation of the landfill site
- Date: September 26, 1983
- Location: Otero County, New Mexico, US; 32°44′21.4″N 105°59′21.7″W
- Participants: Atari, Inc., City of Alamogordo, New Mexico, US

The Atari video game burial was a mass burial of unsold video game cartridges, consoles, and computers in a landfill site in Alamogordo, New Mexico, undertaken by the American video game and home computer company Atari, Inc. in 1983. Before 2014, the goods buried were rumored to be unsold copies of E.T. the Extra-Terrestrial (1982), one of the largest commercial video game failures and often cited as one of the worst video games ever released, and the 1982 Atari 2600 port of Pac-Man, which was commercially successful but critically maligned.

Since the burial was first reported, there had been doubts as to its veracity and scope, and it was frequently dismissed as an urban legend. The event became a cultural icon and a reminder of the video game crash of 1983; it was the end result of a disastrous fiscal year which saw Atari, Inc. sold off by its parent company Warner Communications. Though it was believed that millions of copies of E.T. were buried, Atari officials later verified the numbers to be around 700,000 cartridges of various games, including E.T.

In 2014, Fuel Industries, Microsoft, and others worked with the New Mexico government to excavate the site as part of a documentary, Atari: Game Over. On April 26, 2014, the excavation revealed discarded games and hardware. Only a small fraction, about 1,300 cartridges, were recovered, with a portion given for curation and the rest auctioned to raise money for a museum to commemorate the burial.

== Circumstances ==
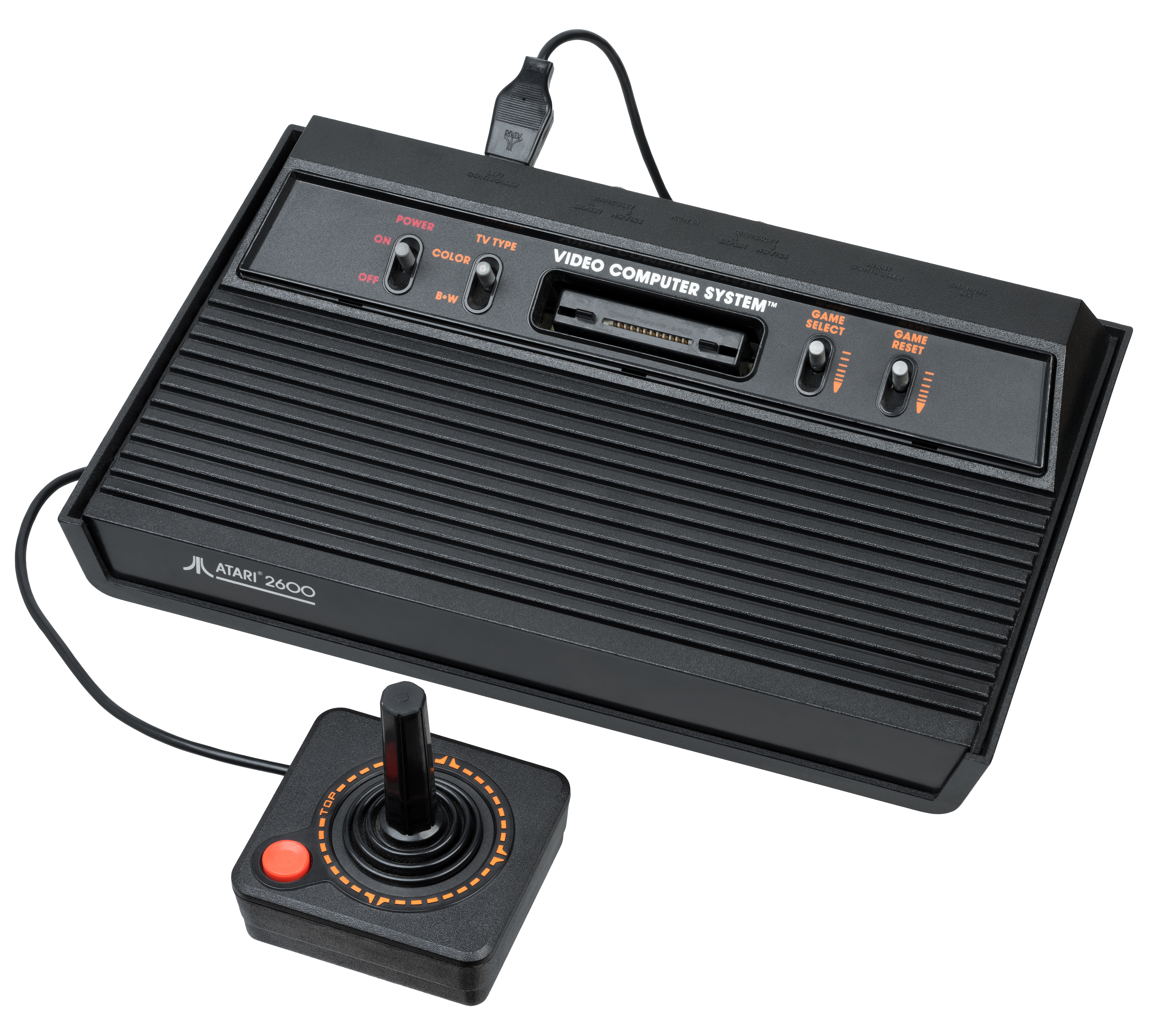
Atari 2600 consoles and cartridges were amongst the material reportedly disposed of as a result of the burial.

=== Financial difficulty ===
Atari, Inc. had been purchased by Warner Communications in 1976 for $28 million, and had seen its net worth grow to $2 billion by 1982. By this time, the company accounted for 80% of the video gaming market and was responsible for over half of its parent company's revenues, earning some 65–70% of their operating profits. By the last quarter of 1982, its growth in the following year was expected to be in the region of 50%. However, on December 7, 1982, the company reported that its earnings had only increased by 10–15%, rather than the predicted figure. The next day saw Warner Communications' share prices fall by a third, and the quarter ended with Warner's profits falling by 56%. In addition, Atari's CEO, Ray Kassar, was later investigated for possible insider trading charges as a result of selling some five thousand shares in Warner less than half an hour before reporting Atari's lower-than-expected earnings. Kassar was later cleared of any wrongdoing, although he was forced to resign his position the following July. Atari, Inc. went on to lose $536 million in 1983, and it was sold off by Warner Communications the following year.

=== Failed games ===
Atari's tendency to port arcade games for its home console had led to some of its most commercially successful games, including the port of its own coin-op Asteroids, as well as the licensed versions of Taito's Space Invaders and Namco's Pac-Man. When the latter game received its official port to the Atari 2600, Atari was confident that sales figures would be high, and manufactured 12 million cartridges—despite having sold only around 10 million Atari 2600 consoles. It was believed that the game would be successful enough not only to earn an estimated $500 million, but also to boost sales of the console itself by several million as gamers sought to play the home conversion. However, the finished product, released in March 1982, was critically panned for its poor gameplay, and although it became the console's best-selling game after shipping 7 million units, it left Atari with over 5 million unsold cartridges—a problem compounded by the high rate of customers returning the game for refunds.

Further to the problems caused by Pac-Man's underwhelming sales, Atari also faced great difficulty as a result of its video game adaptation of the film E.T. the Extra-Terrestrial. The game was a result of a deal between Warner Communications and the film's director Steven Spielberg, and was an attempt to follow the success of Atari's Raiders of the Lost Ark, another film-based game. It was later reported that Warner had paid $20–25 million for the rights, which was at the time a high figure for video game licensing. The task of developing the game fell on Howard Scott Warshaw, the programmer for Raiders, but due to lengthy delays in the licensing rights, Warshaw had only five weeks to make a full game to make sure Atari could sell it during the upcoming holiday period. The rushed development resulted in lackluster gameplay; the game was critically panned, and is now seen as one of the worst ever made. Atari manufactured 5 million cartridges for the game; however, upon its release in December 1982, only 1.5 million copies were sold, leaving Atari with half of the cartridges. Billboard writer Earl Paige reported that the large number of unsold E.T games, along with an increase in competition, prompted retailers to demand official return programs from video game manufacturers.

The failures of these games were further compounded by Atari's business dealings from 1981. Confident in strong sales, the company had told its distributors to place their 1982 orders all at once. However, video game sales in 1982 had slowed, and distributors who had ordered en masse in expectation of high turnover were left to simply return large quantities of unsold stock to Atari. As a result, the company soon found itself in possession of several million essentially useless video game cartridges, which it was entirely unable to sell.

== Burial ==
The burial is located to the south of Alamogordo, New Mexico.

In September 1983, the Alamogordo Daily News of Alamogordo, New Mexico, reported in a series of articles that between 10 and 20 semi-trailer truckloads of Atari boxes, cartridges, and systems from an Atari storehouse in El Paso, Texas, were crushed and buried at the landfill to the south of city. It was Atari's first dealings with the landfill, which was chosen because no scavenging was allowed and its garbage was crushed and buried nightly. Atari's stated reason for the burial was that it was changing from Atari 2600 to Atari 5200 games, but this was later contradicted by a worker who claimed that this was not the case. Atari official Bruce Enten stated that Atari was mostly sending broken and returned material to the Alamogordo dump and that it was "by-and-large inoperable stuff."

On September 27, 1983, the news service Tribune Wires reported that "people watching the operation said it included cassettes [sic] of the popular video games E.T., Pac-Man, Ms. Pac-Man, the consoles used to convey the games to television screens, and high-priced personal computers." The news service Knight Ridder further reported on the looting of the dump on September 28 by local kids, stating "kids in this town of 25,000 began robbing the Atari grave, coming up with cartridges of such games as E.T., Raiders of the Lost Ark, Defender, and Berzerk."

On September 28, 1983, The New York Times reported on the story of Atari's dumping in New Mexico. An Atari representative confirmed the story for the newspaper, stating that the discarded inventory came from Atari's plant in El Paso, which was being closed and converted to a recycling facility. The reports noted that the site was guarded to prevent reporters and the public from affirming the contents. The Times article did not specify the games being destroyed, but subsequent reports generally linked the story of the dumping to the well-known failure of E.T. Additionally, the headline "City to Atari: 'E.T.' trash go home" in one edition of the Alamogordo News seems to imply some of the cartridges were E.T., but then follows with a humorous interpretation of E.T. meaning "Extra-territorial" and never specifically mentions the game.

Starting on September 29, 1983, a layer of concrete was poured on top of the crushed materials, a rare occurrence in waste disposal. An anonymous workman's stated reason for the concrete was: "There are dead animals down there. We wouldn't want any children to get hurt digging in the dump." Eventually, the city began to protest the large amount of dumping Atari was doing, with one commissioner stating that the area did not want to become "an industrial waste dump for El Paso." The local manager ordered an end to the dumping shortly afterwards. Due to Atari's unpopular dumping, Alamogordo later passed an Emergency Management Act and created the Emergency Management Task Force to limit the future flexibility of the garbage contractor to secure outside business for the landfill for monetary purposes. Alamogordo's then-mayor, Henry Pacelli, commented that, "We do not want to see something like this happen again."

=== Cultural symbolism and speculation ===
All of these factors led to wide speculation that most of the 3.5 million unsold copies of E.T. the Extra-Terrestrial ultimately wound up in this landfill, crushed and encased in concrete. It had also been reported that prototypes for the proposed Atari Mindlink controller system were disposed of at the site, which only further fueled speculation, since Atari Museum owner Curt Vendel owns and possesses the Mindlink prototypes. Writing for the Pacific Historical Review, John Wills speculated that location's place in the public psyche—its proximity to the sites of both the Trinity nuclear test and Roswell UFO incident—aided the popularity of the story.

The conflicting information surrounding the burial led to the claim of it being an "E.T. Dump" being referred to as an urban legend; in turn, this led to a degree of skepticism and doubt over the veracity of the dumping story itself, and the relevance of conflating the event with the later industry downturn. In October 2004, Howard Scott Warshaw, the programmer responsible for the E.T. the Extra-Terrestrial game, expressed doubts at the time that the destruction of millions of copies of the game ever took place. Warshaw also believes that Atari's downfall was more a result of their business practices—including alleged block booking of poorly selling games with successful ones when dealing with distributors—than any specific failed games. This latter view has been echoed by Travis Fahs of IGN, who believes that Atari's problems, including their huge surplus of unsold stock, arose from the company's overestimation of the sustainability of Atari 2600 sales, rather than being due to the individual quality of games being released.

The incident has become a cultural symbol representative of the video game crash of 1983. It is often cited as a cautionary tale about the hubris of poor business practices, despite suggestions that the burial allowed the company to write off the disposed-of material for tax relief purposes.

=== In popular culture ===
The legacy of the burial has led it to be referenced in popular culture. The music video for the song "When I Wake Up" by Wintergreen depicts the band traveling to the landfill site and proceeding to dig up the abandoned cartridges; the video's director Keith Schofield had worked with video game-based music videos before. The novel Lucky Wander Boy by D.B. Weiss features a scene which takes place outside of Alamogordo, in which two of the characters discuss a parking lot which has been built over the site of the burial. The 2014 film Angry Video Game Nerd: The Movie features a plot centered on the burial. The episode "The Games Underfoot" of the procedural drama Elementary featured a fictional version of the Atari (renamed "Emeryvision") video game burial.

== Excavation ==
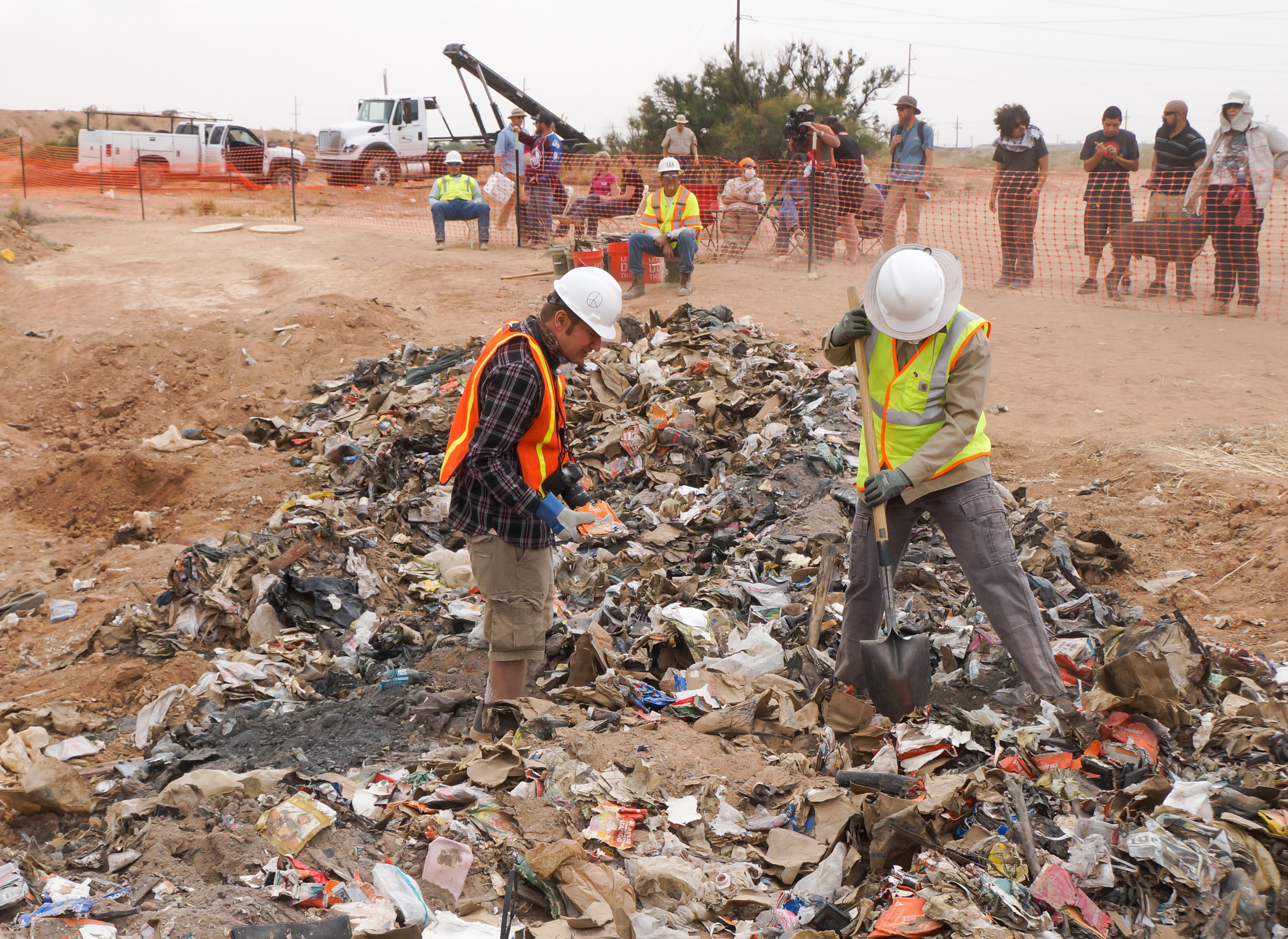
Excavating the landfill. Boxes of Yars' Revenge, Star Raiders, Pac-Man, Space Invaders, Defender and Warlords can be seen.

On May 28, 2013, the Alamogordo City Commission granted Fuel Industries, a Canadian entertainment company, six months of access to the landfill to film a documentary, Atari: Game Over, about the burial and to excavate the dump site. Xbox Entertainment Studios planned to air this documentary series as an exclusive to the Xbox One and Xbox 360 in 2014 as part of a multi-part documentary series being produced by Lightbox, a US/UK production company. Though the excavation was momentarily stalled due to a complaint by the New Mexico Environmental Protection Division Solid Waste Bureau citing potential hazards, the issues were resolved in early April 2014 to allow the excavation to proceed.

Excavation started on April 26, 2014 as an open event to the public. E.T. the Extra-Terrestrial designer Howard Scott Warshaw, Ready Player One author Ernest Cline, and film director Zak Penn attended the event as part of a documentary about the burial, as did local residents such as Armando Ortega, a city official who was reportedly one of the original children to raid the dump in 1983. Ortega stated that although he and his friends found dozens of quality games, they gave the E.T. cartridges away because the "game sucked ... you couldn't finish it". James Heller, the former Atari manager in charge of the original burial, was also on hand at the excavation. Heller revealed that he had originally ordered the site to be covered in concrete. Contrary to the urban legend that claims millions of cartridges were buried there, Heller stated that only 728,000 cartridges were buried.

Remnants of E.T. and other Atari games were discovered in the early hours of the excavation, as reported by Microsoft's Larry Hryb. A team of archaeologists was present to examine and document the Atari material unearthed by excavation machinery: Andrew Reinhard (American School of Classical Studies at Athens), Richard Rothaus (Trefoil Cultural and Environmental), Bill Caraher (University of North Dakota), with support from video game historian Raiford Guins (Stony Brook University) and historian Bret Weber (University of North Dakota).

Only about 1,300 cartridges of the estimated 700,000 were removed from the burial, as the remaining materials were deeper than expected; this made them more difficult to access, according to Alamogordo mayor Susie Galea. The cartridges found were from 59 different games, the majority of which were for the Atari 2600; six were Atari 5200 titles. Atari hardware was also excavated. The burial was refilled following this event. Joseph Lewandowski, who had worked to arrange the unearthing with the city, said that this was a one-time shot to recover materials from the site, as they do not expect the city to agree to a similar event again.

=== Curation and auction ===
Of the recovered materials, a fraction was given to the New Mexico Museum of Space History to be displayed and curated for sale. Another 100 artefacts were given to the documentary producers Lightbox and Fuel Entertainment. The Centre for Computing History in Cambridge, England also received some artifacts from the desert, which are on permanent display in the museum gallery. Galea believed the remaining cartridges can be sold by the city of Alamogordo through the Museum of Space History. She hopes that the sale of these games can help fund recognition of the burial site as a tourist attraction in the future. The City of Alamogordo approved the auction of the games in September 2014, sold through eBay and the Alamogordo Council website. As of April 2025, over $107,000 has been raised through the sales of about 880 unearthed cartridges, with one E.T. copy selling for more than $1,500. These funds were used to support the city's public works and the Tularosa Basin Museum of History.

One of the E.T. cartridges that had been dug up was taken by the Smithsonian Institution for its records, calling the cartridge both representative of the burial site but also in terms of video games, how the cartridge represents "the ongoing challenge of making a good film to a video game adaptation, the decline of Atari, the end of an era for video game manufacturing, and the video game cartridge life cycle".

== See also ==
- List of commercial failures in video and arcade games
- Second generation of video game consoles
