= Yars' Revenge =

1982 video game

- Cover art by Hiro Kimura
- Developer: Atari, Inc.
- Publishers: Atari, Inc.
- Designer: Howard Scott Warshaw
- Series: Yars
- Platforms: Atari 2600, Game Boy Color
- Release: Atari 2600; May 1982; Game Boy Color; September 1999
- Genre: Fixed shooter
- Mode: Single-player

Yars' Revenge is a 1982 fixed shooter video game developed by and published by Atari, Inc. for the Atari Video Computer System. (Note: The system became known as the Atari 2600 only after the release of the Atari 5200 in 1982.) Set in the Razak solar system, it focuses on the conflict between the Yars, a fly-like humanoid alien race, and the Qotile, who have destroyed their habitable planets. The player controls a Yar tasked with destroying the Qotile's energy shield, and finishing off the enemy with the Zorlon cannon.

Initially tasked with developing a port of the arcade game Star Castle, designer Howard Scott Warshaw focused on graphics and taking in feedback from co-workers to develop its gameplay. He was also responsible for the backstory of the game, which was adapted as a comic book included with the game.

The game received positive retrospective reviews from publications such as Flux, AllGame, and Retro Gamer. It has since been re-released on various Atari-themed video game compilations, and received several follow-ups and remakes, including Yar's Revenge (2011), Yars: Recharged (2022), and Yars Rising (2024).

== Plot ==
The backstory of the game features the Yars, a fly-like humanoid alien race that descended from the common housefly. After a space ship containing these flies crashes into the Razak solar system, radioactive dust transformed them into Yars. They gained powers that let them devour any substance and convert energy into powerful projectiles able to vaporize solid rock. The Yars discover they can fly through space and began peacefully populating planets throughout Razak.

To protect their new homes, the Yars began creating the Zorlon Cannon, but were attacked before they were able to complete it. This left them open to attack from the Qotile, who dissolved one of their planets, Planet IV, leaving it to a place now known as the neutral zone. To avenge their planet, the Yars developed a plan to use the incomplete Zorlon Cannon. The Qotile hide behind an energy shield, where they can attack with missiles and objects called "swirls". The Yars become outfitted as warriors where they can break through the Qotile shield and call upon the Zorlon Cannon. The new task is for the Yars to call upon the cannon by devouring the cells that the energy shield is made of or touching the Qotile to have it fire and destroy their enemy.

== Gameplay ==
Gameplay from Yars' Revenge. The Yar is on the left side of the screen while the Qotile is behind the curved shield. The destroyer missile is just above Yar.

Yars' Revenge is part of the subgenre of shooter games called either the fixed or single-screen shooter. Yars' Revenge differs from many other similar popular games from that era such as Space Invaders (1978), Galaxian (1979), or Gorf (1981) as its gameplay has the main axis of conflict oriented horizontally rather than vertically. The player controls Yar, a fly-like object which can be moved in any direction on the screen. The screen wraps vertically. The primary goal in Yars' Revenge is to break a path through the energy shield and destroy the Qotile with a hit from the Zorlon cannon. The shield is the object on the right side of the screen shaped like an arch or a shifting rectangle. It is made up of cells. To do this, the player can fire energy missiles shot from Yar which can destroy the cells in the shield or by directly coming into contact with them allowing Yar to devour them. Once a clear path to the Qotile behind the shield is open, the cannon can be readied by either eating a cell or moving Yar over the Qotile.

Each player starts with four lives. When Yar is hit by items fired by the Qotile such as guided missiles called destroyer missiles and the swirling pinwheels called swirls, the player loses a life. The destroyer missiles are continuously on the screen, while the swirl is something the Qotile transforms itself into and can be destroyed by the Zorlon cannon. The cannon appears on the left side of the screen and moves with a direct line with Yar, putting the player in the line of fire. The player must aim it at the Qotile and dodge out of the way as having Yar hit by it makes them lose a life. A colorful band down the center of the playfield is the neutral zone. When the player maneuvers their Yar within it they are protected from destroyer missiles, but cannot fire their weapon.

The secondary task is to gain a high score from earning points in the game. Points are collected by destroying an energy cell, Qotile or a swirl. High scores are indicated by changes in gameplay: the swirl activates more frequently when the player reaches 70,000 and 230,000 points and the enemy shield changes colors from blue to gray to pink when certain points thresholds are met.

There are several variations of the game that player can set by adjusting the A and B switches on the console. Variations of the game include have the game adjust the speed of both the destroyer missile and the swirl, the frequency of how often the swirl appears and a mode called Ultimate Yars. In this version, the Zorlon cannon bounces back shots from the shield if it hits it, and Yar must collect units of energy called trons to summon the cannon. They are collected by eating a cell, touching the Qotile and catching a zorlon cannon shot after it bounces off the shield.

== Development ==
Yars' Revenge was the first game designed by Howard Scott Warshaw for Atari, Inc. Prior to working at Atari, Warshaw worked for Hewlett-Packard (HP) working in their networking software department. He found the work environment dull, and heard about Atari from a co-worker, understanding it as a place "where the kind of crazy stuff that [Warshaw] would do at HP would be a common occurrence". Initially, Warshaw was also more interested in the company for its available technology than for developing video games as he was not that involved in gaming prior, as he was excited by the idea of Atari doing real-time control programming.

After interviewing and receiving a job at the company, he opted to work on what he described their most primitive technology and was tasked to work on a port of the arcade game Star Castle (1980) by Cinematronics for the Atari VCS. Warshaw told his supervisor Dennis Koble that the arcade game could not be made properly for the system, and suggested to make a game that would rearrange the basic gameplay and dynamics of Star Castle. This led to Warshaw making Yars' Revenge which eventually was developed under the name Time Freeze.

The game took nine months to develop. Warshaw focused on the project's graphics and animation, wanting every object in the game to be animated. The first thing he created for the game was an animated character. This character had elements like arms flickering back and forth, making the playable character resemble a fly. He also made several graphics symmetrical to save space on the cartridge. Warshaw had a love of film, and particularly enjoyed science fiction films and said that that led him to also focus on how sound effects could affect gameplay. He said, "Most games had bleeps. The occasional event would happen and you would get some audio feedback. I wanted sound to create mood, foreshadow events and build tension," and tried to use sound to give the game a bigger impression. The Ion Zone was initially designed as a visual effect, but then incorporated into gameplay. The visuals of the zone are generated by randomized data pulled from grabbing bytes of code and displayed on the screen creating the glittering colorful effect. After achieving what he wanted from the visuals, he found it unsatisfactory as a game and began taking feedback from others leading him to make a game that he described as "suddenly, really good".

Yars' Revenge went through months of playtesting. Atari's Director of Game Development, Steven Wright had it play tested alongside Missile Command (1981) for the Atari VCS. These play tests consisted of having over a hundred people playing the game and rating it afterwards. According to Warshaw, Wright said the game had "long-term playability concerns" and was continuously relisted for play testing. Warshaw responded that he was upset that the game was continuously retested, noting it received positive reviews, particularly from female gamers.

== Promotion and release ==
Warshaw discussed with a project manager naming the game and said he would give them a name the next day. He felt coming up with a name difficult. He felt an action word would be appropriate for an action game and opted for "Revenge". This was followed by a character name, and he chose the CEO of Atari Ray Kassar and spelled his name backwards feeling "Yar" was an appropriate science fiction styled name. He then wrote a 10-page story called The Yarian Revenge of Razak IV. A comic titled Yars' Revenge: The Qotile Ultimatum was included with the game based on Warshaw's story treatment. Within the comic release, Warshaw was credited as the game's programmer, making him the first Atari programmer to have his name publicly credited and printed within a release.

The game's cover art was designed by Hiro Kimura. Kimura was recruited by Atari art directors James Kelly and Steve Hendricks right after graduating the ArtCenter College of Design in Los Angeles. It was Kimura's first package illustration after having completed several manual illustrations for the company. Kimura designed the fly on the cover as a chrome-plated insect and recalled struggling with it, saying that it was the first time they used an air-brush "almost exclusively" for the first time. Kimura played every game he illustrated for the company, saying he tried to capture their "uniqueness and excitement".

With the release of Atari's console version of Space Invaders (1980), along with their popular arcade games Asteroids (1979), Missile Command (1980) and Battlezone (1980) would move Atari to a growth of $512.7 million for 1980. Atari would be even larger by 1981 where their total sales earned them $1.1 billion. Yars' Revenge was released in May 1982 and published by Atari. Yars' Revenge promotion included commercials promoting the game in film theatres.

Yars' Revenge has since been re-released in various Atari-themed compilations, such as the Atari 80 in One for Windows in 2003, on the first release of the Atari Flashback series of dedicated consoles and the compilations releases Atari Anthology in 2004 and Atari 50 in 2022, and with the 10-Games in 1 cart included with the Atari 2600+ in 2023. It was also released to portable game systems such as a compilation for the Game Boy Advance in 2005, Atari Classics Evolved (2007) for the PlayStation Portable and digitally through Game Room.

== Reception ==
From contemporary reviews, Bill Kunkel and Arnie Katz of Electronic Games noted that the sound in the game was excellent and the graphics were "quite acceptable" but found that the game was not exciting with an objective that was repeated indefinitely, stating that "Yar is far too static" and that modern audiences would want more variety in gameplay and graphics. The review also commented on the comic book's inclusion, praising it as a high quality comic that gave context to the game. In a review in the next month's issue of the magazine, the editors briefly described the game as being "mediocre". A reviewer in the magazine Video Games had similar comments, noting fine graphics and sound effects but found the game suffered due to the repetition of the two cycles of levels. In the Brazilian magazine Micro & Video, the player found the game to have low-quality graphics and "good enough" sound effects, stating it had "too much imagination for too little game."

Lou Hudson of the Fort Worth Star-Telegram stated that despite the game sounding "boringly simple" that it was "an intriguing game", predicting it to be a sleeper hit for Atari. In Ken Uston's book Ken Uston's Guide to Buying and Beating the Home Video Games (1982), the author praised the game for its "superior graphics" and its addictive nature. Olivier Chazoule of the French video game magazine Tilt also commented on the games addictive qualities, and found Yars' Revenge as combining both familiar and "a pinch of revolutionary gameplay concepts" to make it a very interesting game.

=== Retrospective ===
Retrospective Reception

Review scores
Publication	Score
AllGame	4/5
The Video Games Guide	1/5

Brett Alan Weiss praised the game for its high level of originality, and that elements like the neutral zone gave the game a graphical flair, while finding the audio to be annoying and would grate people's ears. Weiss included the game in his book The 100 Greatest Console Video Games, 1977-1987 (2014), praising it as a game that required more strategy and planning than most games in its genre during the period. In his book The Video Games Guide, Matt Fox conversely described the game as "surprisingly well remembered" attributing this to the cover art rather than the game play, stating the game was a "diabolical old Atari VCS game".

In 1995, the editors of Flux magazine ranked Yars' Revenge as number 90 on their list of "Top 100 Video Games". Darran Jones and Stuart Hunt of Retro Gamer listed the game at fifth place in their Top Atari 2600 games in 2008 article. They praised it for being a highly addictive and "fantastically atmospheric shoot-'em-up".

== Legacy ==
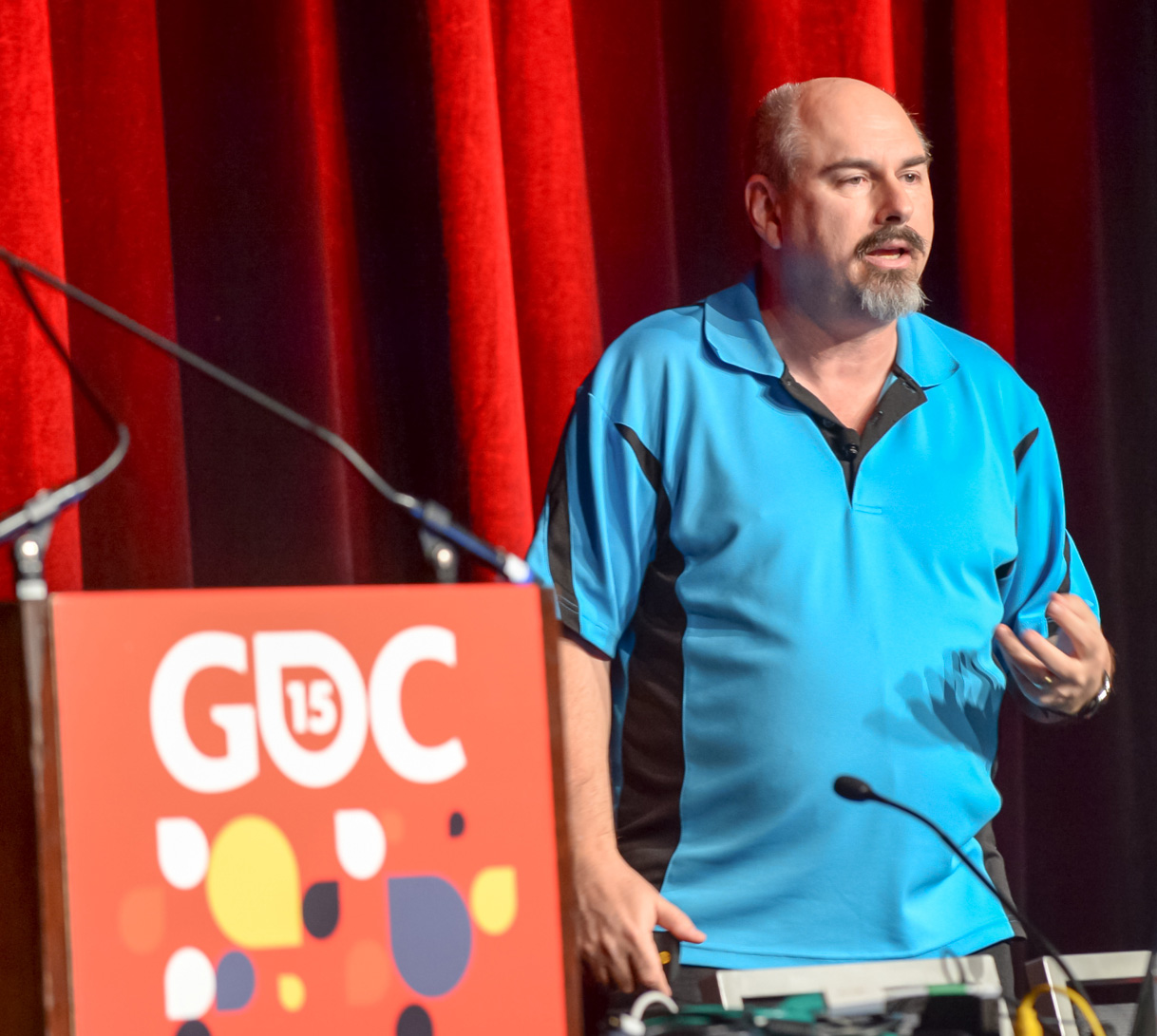
Warshaw gave a presentation on designing and coding Yars' Revenge at the 2015 Game Developers Conference.

Howard Scott Warshaw went on to program other high-profile games based on films for the Atari 2600: Raiders of the Lost Ark (1982) and E.T. the Extra-Terrestrial (1982). Warshaw has included Yars aliens as a secret in both games. Warshaw was developing a sequel to the game in 1983 titled Saboteur which was converted into a video game based on The A-Team to fulfill a licensing obligation. Warshaw left Atari in 1984. He did not return to the video game industry until 1999, working at The 3DO Company as the director on games like BattleTanx: Global Assault (1999) and WarJetz (2001) and has worked various other jobs, including as a photographer, a real estate banker, a film director since.

Following the release of the comic in Yars' Revenge other Atari works had comics included with their respective games such as the Swordquest series and the Atari 2600 version of Defender (1982). Defender and several other comics that followed in Atari console games like Star Raiders (1982) and Phoenix (1983) which would be developed by Warner Bros subsidiary DC Comics. These comics featured original characters called The Atari Force who were later included within the arcade game Liberator (1982).

Warshaw said that the most exciting part of the game for him later was making a significant debut, making a game that was good enough that he enjoyed playing it, and that if he had to pick favorite thing about the game, was that the game had "scored highest among adult women, the single hardest market segment to reach". He suggested in 2006 that the appeal towards women was due to what he described as "the oral component [...] like Pac-Man, you nibble and you run away. The more you eat, the closer you get to danger..."

=== Follow-ups and remakes ===
Release timeline
1982	Yars' Revenge
1983–2004
2005	Yars' Return
2006–2010
2011	Yar's Revenge
2012–2021
2022	Yars: Recharged
2022	Yars' Revenge Reimagined
2023
2024	Yars Rising

Warshaw said that Atari programmer Dave Theurer was interested in making an arcade conversion of the game, which never went into development. Warshaw also created his own sequel to the game which remains unreleased. The game was described as being set on Yars' training grounds and saw the players acquiring the skills to defeat the Qotile. Atari initially had an agreement with Warshaw to the game, with the company putting the project on hold as they were not at a position do development at the time. Warshaw has since tried to get the game developed through another developer and said in 2024 that "a design exists" and he was "ready to begin implementation when they are".

Several remakes and sequels of the game have been released years after the release of the original game. A Game Boy Color remake of Yars' Revenge was released in September 1999 by Telegames. This version of the game features differences from the original game, such as a scrolling screen, a secret bonus level with a where the player maneuvers Yar left and right to avoid asteroids and to touch the Ghost of Yar for extra points, intermission screens with graphics and a password-based continue system. This version was developed in the mid-1990s by Mike Mika. Warshaw met with Mika during the game's development and described him as a "committed and talented game maker. We became friends, and our paths have run parallel ever since." Mika would later make Yars' Revenge Reimagined on the Atari 50 (2022) game, which reuses the code of Warshaw's Yars' Revenge.

Other sequels and remakes include Yars' Return developed by Curt Vendel, which was included on the Atari Flashback 2 console in 2005. After the initial release, Dennis Debro worked at Vendel's direction to make some improvements and enhancements, and that revised version was included in later releases of the Flashback. Atari announced a new game developed by Killspace Entertainment titled Yar's Revenge in 2010. The game was in the rail shooter genre and borrows elements from the original such as the neutral zone and a drone that automatically locks onto and fires at enemies. It was the company's only game and released in 2011 for the Xbox Live Arcade following the studio formally closing in 2012. Warshaw commented on the game in 2016, saying that its genre gave the game a predetermined course which made it lack the freedom of movement of the original, stating that he was "very disappointed in [Yar's Revenge]"

In 2022, Yars: Recharged was released as part of Atari's partnership between developers Adamvision and Sneakybox, which created new versions of popular Atari games under the Atari Recharged banner. Yars Rising was announced at an Indie World Nintendo Direct for release on September 10, 2024. The game was developed by WayForward and is a side-scrolling action-adventure game, with mini-games that resemble the original game. Warshaw had no involvement in the 2024 game.

== See also ==
- List of Atari 2600 games
- List of Atari, Inc. games (1972–1984)
- List of best-selling Atari 2600 video games
- List of Game Boy Color games
