= Yars Rising =

2024 video game

- Developer: WayForward
- Publisher: Atari
- Directors: Matt Bozon; James Montagna
- Producer: Brian Smith
- Designer: Barrett Velia
- Programmers: Robert Koshak; James Guintu
- Artist: Elina Bell
- Writers: Adam Tierney; James Montagna
- Composer: Tommy Pedrini
- Series: Yars
- Engine: Unity
- Platforms: Nintendo Switch, PlayStation 4, PlayStation 5, Windows, Xbox One, Xbox Series X/S, Atari VCS
- Release: WW: September 10, 2024
- Genres: Action-adventure, Metroidvania
- Mode: Single-player

Yars Rising is a 2024 action-adventure video game developed by WayForward and published by Atari, Inc. for home consoles and computers. It is part of the Yars series.

== Gameplay ==
Gameplay screenshot

Yars Rising has been described as a metroidvania game with 2D exploration and labyrinthian level design. The player is tasked with hacking into terminals while progressing through the game, giving the player-character different abilities by altering her DNA.

== Plot ==
Set in the year 2049, Yars Rising is about Emi Kimura, a young hacker who is hired to expose the dark workings of the shady QoTech corporation.

== Development and release ==
Yars Rising was announced at an Indie World Nintendo Direct on April 17, 2024. Its creator James Montagna said that the game was made to be "a little bit unconventional" for the Yars IP. He added that they were going for what he called "freeform stealth" in the gameplay, while the environment was based on retrofuturism. Howard Scott Warshaw was not involved in the development of Yars Rising.

The soundtrack of the game consists of music composed by a collaboration of twenty international artists, and includes vocal tracks in both English and Japanese. The music too was designed to be parallel with the retrofuturistic game theme. The team also worked on making the most out of the rumble feature of the Joy-Con, on the Nintendo Switch version of the game.

Development was done by American studio WayForward, who are known for Shantae (2002) and River City Girls (2019).

It was released on September 10, 2024, with physical editions for PlayStation 5 and Nintendo Switch.

== Reception ==
Reception

Aggregate scores
Aggregator	Score
Metacritic	NS: 75/100; XBXS: 70/100; PC: 63/100; PS5: 59/100
OpenCritic	58% recommend

Yars Rising received "mixed or average" reviews according to the review aggregation website Metacritic, and generally favorable reviews for the Nintendo Switch version specifically. Fellow review aggregator OpenCritic assessed that the game received fair approval, being recommended by 58% of critics. Reviews by PC Gamer, Rolling Stone and Slant Magazine found the game's 2D platforming sequences weak with simple platforming, while commenting that the hacking sequences were the high points.

== See also ==
- List of Atari video games (2001–present)
