= Fuel Industries =

Canadian online marketing agency

- Company type: Private
- Industry: Branded Entertainment & Advergaming & Services
- Founded: 1999
- Defunct: 2017
- Headquarters: Ottawa, Ontario, Canada
- Key people: Mike Burns (CEO); Andy Wing (CEO); Jeff Doiron Founding Partner; Dave Ozipko Founding Partner
- Products: Digital Engagement; Immersive Web Experience; Custom Application Development; Video/Audio production
- Number of employees: 150 (2013)
- Website: www.fuelindustries.com (Archived 2012)

Fuel Industries was a Canadian online interactive and marketing agency. Founded in 1999 by Mike Burns, Jeff Doiron, Dave Ozipko and Brian Nesbitt, Fuel Industries employed over 150 people and had offices in Los Angeles and Seattle.

== Overview ==
Fuel Industries won a number of awards including Digital Entertainment & Media Excellence Awards for Advergame of the year as well as numerous Digital Marketing Awards and Flash in the can awards.

Fuel Entertainment was a division of Fuel Industries specializing in the development of Fuel's own entertainment properties, such as SparkCityWorld.com, a gaming portal and virtual world for preteen girls, and Sideway: New York, a graffiti-themed video game released on the PlayStation Network. Mike Burns had the idea for the girl-themed virtual world on his twin girls' birthday, as it said in the newspaper.

== Growth ==
Fuel Industries revenues doubled in 2006 from the previous year, and has continued to grow into a custom production shop and creative studio. Andrew Wing was appointed the Co-CEO of the company in 2011, to lead alongside Mike Burns.

In 2015, Fuel announced the creation of its Playground division, an internal lab focusing on emerging technologies and innovation.

In 2017 Fuel declared bankruptcy.

== Recognition ==
Fuel Industries received numerous awards for both its work in advergaming and branded entertainment. In 2012, Fuel won best in Branded Entertainment at the Digi Awards for its work with McDonald's Europe on its virtual world Happy Studio. In 2008, Fuel won Gold at the London International Awards for its work on Sexy Subaru with Tribal DDB, as well as several FWA awards and three shortlists for Flash in the Can Awards.

In 2007, Fuel won Best Game, Best Canadian Studio and Best Convergence at Flash in the Can. The same year, Fuel became a Webby Awards Honoree for its work on the American Dad Vs. Family Guy Kung Fu advergame.

In 2006, CEO Mike Burns was a recipient of the Ottawa Business Journal's Forty under 40 award, recognizing him as one of Silicon Valley North's most noteworthy up and coming entrepreneurs.

In 2012 Mike Burns and Ryan Valley (Director of Sales) re-located to the Los Angeles office.

On May 28, 2013, the Alamogordo City Commission (in the state of New Mexico) granted Fuel Industries six months of access to a landfill rumored to contain Atari video games. The purpose was to film a documentary about the burial, later named Atari: Game Over, and to excavate the dump site. On April 26, 2014, hundreds of E.T. the Extra-Terrestrial cartridges were unearthed, mixed in with trash and dirt scooped by a backhoe.

Atari: Game Over won Best Documentary at the 2015 Streamy Awards
