= Yars: Recharged =

2022 video game

- Developer: Adamvision Studios
- Publisher: Atari
- Series: Yars
- Platforms: Atari VCS, PlayStation 4, PlayStation 5, Stadia, Xbox One, Xbox Series X/S, Windows, Nintendo Switch
- Release: August 23, 2022
- Genre: Twin-stick shooter
- Modes: Single-player, multiplayer

Yars: Recharged is a twin-stick shooter developed by Vancouver-based company Adamvision Studios and published by Atari. It is a remake of Yars' Revenge, a 1982 Atari 2600 shooter. It was released on August 23, 2022, for Atari VCS, PlayStation 4, PlayStation 5, Stadia, Windows, Xbox One, Xbox Series X/S, and Nintendo Switch. Unlike the previous remake, Yar's Revenge, it stays significantly closer to the source material, with top-down neo-retro style graphics and its Yar protagonist being an anthropomorphic fly. The player must charge a meter that powers the Zorlon Cannon, the only thing that can penetrate the shields of the Qotile, while defeating other enemies and dodging the Qotile's devastating lasers. The game received positive critical reception, citing how it built upon the original game while maintaining its classic arcade feel. The game is part of the Atari Recharged remake series.

== Reception ==
Reception

Aggregate score
Aggregator	Score
Metacritic	83/100

Review scores
Publication	Score
Nintendo Life	6/10
TouchArcade	9/10

The game received an aggregate score of 83/100 for its Switch version on Metacritic, indicating "generally favorable reviews".

Shaun Musgrave of TouchArcade rated the game 9/10 points, calling himself a "big fan". Saying that its stage designs set the game apart, he praised it as adapting the good aspects of the original while improving on it both in visuals and gameplay. Retro Gamer magazine rated the game 78/100, describing it as a "fresh take" on the original, despite minor performance issues and high difficulty.

In contrast, Tom Massey of Nintendo Life rated the game only 6/10 stars, calling it repetitive. While saying it had fun core gameplay and clean graphics, he noted that it had a slower pace than the original.
