= E.T. the Extra-Terrestrial (video game) =

1982 video game

- Atari's silver label box art featuring the titular character and his friend Elliot, two of the main characters from the original film
- Developer: Atari, Inc.
- Publishers: Atari, Inc.
- Designer: Howard Scott Warshaw
- Programmer: Howard Scott Warshaw
- Artists: Howard Scott Warshaw; Jerome Domurat
- Platform: Atari 2600
- Release: NA: December 1982; JP: May 1983
- Genre: Adventure
- Mode: Single-player

E.T. the Extra-Terrestrial is a 1982 adventure video game developed and published by Atari, Inc. for the Atari 2600, based on the film of the same name. The game's objective is to guide the eponymous character through various screens to collect three pieces of an interplanetary telephone that will allow him to contact his home planet.

The game was designed by Howard Scott Warshaw, who intended it to be an innovative adaptation, but Atari held unrealistic expectations for sales based on the international box-office success of the film. Negotiations for the game rights ended in late July 1982, giving Warshaw just over five weeks to develop the game in time to meet the production schedule for the 1982 Christmas season. The final release received negative reviews and is often cited as one of the worst video games of all time, as well as one of the biggest commercial failures in video game history. It is cited as a major contributing factor to the video game crash of 1983, and has been frequently referenced and mocked in popular culture as a cautionary tale about the dangers of rushed game development and studio interference.

In what was once deemed only an urban legend, reports from 1983 stated that as a result of overproduction and returns, unsold cartridges of E.T. were secretly buried in a landfill in Alamogordo, New Mexico, and covered with a layer of concrete. In April 2014, diggers hired to investigate the claim confirmed that the landfill contained several E.T. cartridges, among other games. James Heller, the former Atari manager who was in charge of the burial, was at the excavation, and admitted to the Associated Press that 728,000 cartridges of various games (not just E.T.) were buried. Marty Goldberg, co-author of the book Atari Inc.: Business Is Fun, added that the dump was in fact a clearing out of the Texas Atari manufacturing plant's unused cartridge stock of a number of titles, as well as console and computer parts. According to the 2014 documentary Atari: Game Over, only 10% of the approximately 1,300 recovered were E.T. cartridges.

== Gameplay ==
E.T. meets Elliott in a field of wells. Reese's Pieces are scattered throughout the world and are represented by black dots.

E.T. is an adventure game in which players control the alien E.T. from a top-down perspective. The objective is to collect three pieces of an interplanetary telephone. The pieces are found scattered randomly throughout various pits (also referred to as wells). There is no overall time limit. The player is provided with an on-screen energy bar, which decreases when E.T. performs any actions (including moving, teleporting, or falling into a pit, as well as levitating back to the top). To prevent this, E.T. can collect Reese's Pieces, which are used to restore his energy or, when nine are collected, E.T. can call Elliott to obtain a piece of the telephone, or the player can save the candy pieces for bonus points at the end. After the three phone pieces have been collected, the player must guide E.T. to an area where he can use the phone, which allows him to call his home planet. Once the call is made, a clock appears at the top right of the screen; E.T. has to arrive at the landing zone before it reaches zero. Once E.T. gets to the forest where his ship abandoned him and stands and waits in the designated area for the ship to come, the ship will appear on-screen and take him back to his home planet. Then the game starts over, with the same difficulty level, while changing the location of the telephone pieces. The score obtained during the round is carried over to the next iteration. E.T. has three lives and if he dies within those three lives Elliott will come in and revive him. E.T. can get a fourth life if the player finds a geranium in one of the wells. According to the manual, a game can end "when E.T. runs out of energy or when you decide to quit playing".

The game is divided into six environments, each representing a different setting from the film. To accomplish the objective, the player must guide E.T. into the wells. Once all items found in a well are collected, the player must levitate E.T. out of them. An icon at the top of each screen represents the current area, each area enabling the player to perform different actions. Antagonists include a scientist who takes E.T. for observation and an FBI agent who chases the alien to confiscate one of the collected telephone pieces or candy. The game offers diverse difficulty settings that affect the number and speed of humans present and the conditions needed to accomplish the objective.

== Development ==
Following the commercial success of E.T. the Extra-Terrestrial in June 1982, Steve Ross, CEO of Atari's parent company Warner Communications, began negotiations with the film's director Steven Spielberg and its distributor Universal Pictures to acquire a license to produce a video game based on the film. Later that month, Warner announced its exclusive worldwide rights to market coin-operated and console games based on E.T. Although the exact details of the transaction were not disclosed in the announcement, it was later reported that Atari had paid US$20–25 million ($67–83 million when adjusted for inflation to 2026) for the rights, a high figure for video game licensing at the time. When asked by Ross what he thought about making an E.T.-based video game, Atari CEO Ray Kassar replied: "I think it's a dumb idea. We've never really made an action game out of a movie." An arcade game based on the E.T. property had also been planned, but this was deemed to be impossible given the short deadline.

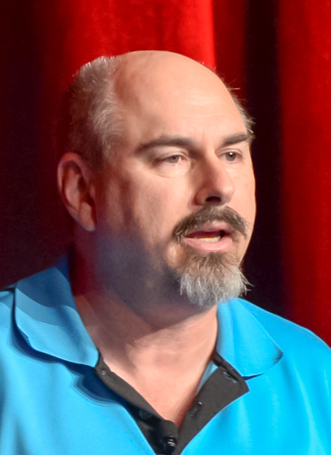
Howard Scott Warshaw (shown in 2015) developed the game within less than six weeks.

On July 27, 1982, after negotiations were completed, Kassar called Howard Scott Warshaw to commission him as developer of the video game adaptation. Kassar informed him that Spielberg asked for Warshaw specifically and that development had to be completed by September 1 to meet a production schedule for the Christmas holiday season. Although Warshaw had spent over a year working on consecutive development schedules for games (seven months working on Yars' Revenge and six months on Raiders of the Lost Ark), he accepted the offer based on the challenge of completing a game in a short time frame and at Spielberg's request. Warshaw considered it an opportunity to develop an innovative Atari 2600 game based on a film he enjoyed, "provided we reach the right arrangement". Kassar reportedly offered Warshaw US$200,000 and an all-expenses-paid vacation to Hawaii in compensation. Warshaw was flown via private jet to Warner Bros. Studios Burbank to meet with Spielberg.

Warshaw used those days to design the structure and segmented the concept into four ideas: world, objective, the path to achieve the objective, and obstacles. He envisioned a six-sided world that players could "float" around as the setting, and adapted part of the film's plot, E.T. phoning home, as the goal. The player would need to gather parts for a phone to call his ship and arrive at a special landing site to achieve this goal. Warshaw considered obstacles as an element that would determine the success of a game, and experienced difficulties when taking into account the time constraints and technical limitations of the console. Inspired by the film, adults were implemented as antagonists that would chase the alien. Pits were devised as an element to hide the pieces of the phone as well as expand the game world.

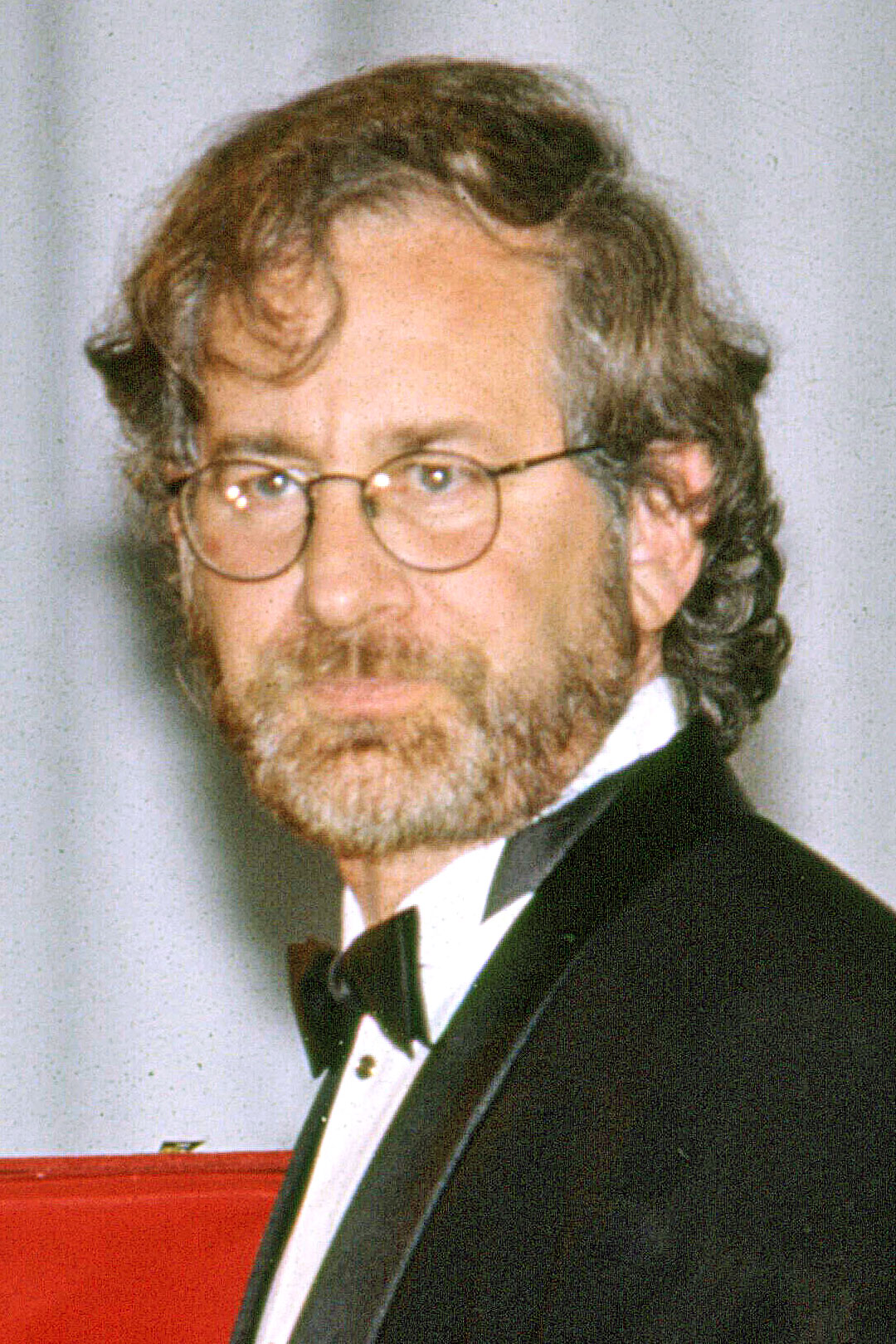
Steven Spielberg (shown in 1993), who directed the eponymous film that inspired the game, suggested a Pac-Man-style game when he first saw Warshaw's designs.

Warshaw and other Atari executives presented this design to Spielberg, who was not enthusiastic. According to Warshaw, Spielberg asked him, "Couldn't you do something more like Pac-Man?" Believing the concept too derivative of a common game design, Warshaw proceeded with his concept, which he believed would capture the sentimentality he saw in the original film Warshaw later stated that, in retrospect, Spielberg's idea might have had merit. He spent the remaining time programming. Atari graphic designer Jerome Domurat assisted Warshaw with creating graphics for the game. Atari anticipated enormous sales based on the popularity of the film, as well as the stability of the video game industry at the time. Due to time limitations, Atari skipped audience testing. Emanual Gerard, then part of the Office of the President of Warner, later suggested that the company had fallen into a false sense of security by the success of its previous releases, particularly its console version of Pac-Man, which was commercially successful despite poor critical reaction.

== Reception ==
Anticipation for the E.T. video game was high, and Atari hoped it would be a sought-after Christmas gift. In early December 1982, The New York Times reported that video games based on successful films, specifically E.T., would become "an increasingly profitable source" for video game development. At first, retailers ordered more supplies than what was expected to be sold, but Atari received an increasing number of order cancellations as new competitors entered the market, which they had not anticipated. John Hubner and William Kistner of InfoWorld have attributed the cancellations to changes Atari initiated in its relationship to distributors. On November 1, 1982, Atari informed them that their contracts were canceled and that exclusive deals would be established with select distributors. Hubner and Kistner believed the action prompted retailers to cancel orders, which Atari had not properly tracked.

E.T. enjoyed initial commercial success, being among the top four on Billboard magazine's "Top 15 Video Games" sales list in December 1982 and January 1983. The game sold over 2.6 million copies by the end of 1982. However, at least 669,000 copies were later returned in 1983. One retailer said that "mostly grandmothers" bought the game; because of word-of-mouth, children preferred the best-selling Pitfall!.

Hubner and Kistner commented that the large number of produced cartridges may have resulted in excess inventory regardless of E.T.'s success. Even though the game was a bestseller during the holiday season, retailers still stated that its sales figures did not meet expectations. Warner Communications also expressed disappointment at the number of sales. Lower-than-expected sales figures combined with excess inventory, which produced a negative supply and demand event, prompted retailers to repeatedly discount the price. According to Ray Kassar, about three and a half million of the four million produced were sent back to the company as unsold inventory or customer returns. Despite sales figures, the quantity of unsold merchandise, coupled with the expensive film license and the large number of returns, made E.T. a major financial failure for Atari.

=== Critical response ===
Upon release, the game was criticized by reviewers, with the gameplay and visuals both areas of concern. New York magazine's Nicholas Pileggi described it as a loser compared to other games Atari could have released during the time period, such as Donkey Kong and Frogger, and Video Games called it "really for kids (the littler ones)". In 1984, the game was named by readers of Softline as the second-worst Atari program of 1983, after Congo Bongo.

The player must navigate E.T. into wells to search for pieces of the interplanetary telephone. This aspect of the game was negatively received by players and critics.

Nevertheless, the game received some positive contemporary reviews. An editor for The Miami Herald described it as difficult to learn to play, but believed that doing so was worth it. For Vidiot's Kevin Christopher, "about the only flaw with an otherwise A-1 game" was that E.T. repeatedly falls back into holes. Arcade Express scored it six out of ten in December 1982. Len Albin of TV Guide wrote that "after seeing the motion picture E.T. 14 times, there's no more suspense left—unless you bring home this one-player cartridge", adding that "it's certain that your patience won't run out—if you're a kid. (Adults may prefer to wait for a game based on My Dinner with Andre.)"

Later reviews were comparably negative. Kevin Bowen of GameSpy's Classic Gaming called the gameplay "convoluted and inane", also criticizing its story for departing from the serious tone of the film, and author Steven Kent described the game as "infamous" within the industry, citing "primitive" graphics, "dull" gameplay, and a "disappointing story". Children who scavenged the landfill where surplus Atari cartridges were buried gave away the E.T. cartridges, with one child noting that the game "sucked", and was impossible to complete. Modern critics have also bemoaned the repeated need to fall down pits. Emru Townsend of PC World discussed the game with a group who described the pits as "monotonous". Sean "Seanbaby" Reiley claimed that the pits are "time-consuming" and "difficult to leave without falling back in". Trent Ward, formerly a reviewer for Next Generation described returning the game as a result of the pits. Classic Gaming argued that despite the negative reception, the game can be enjoyable after the player has learned to navigate the pits.

In published materials written more than a decade after its initial release, E.T. has frequently been listed among the worst video games ever made. Reiley ranked it number one in a list of the 20 worst games of all time in Electronic Gaming Monthly's 150th issue. Interviewed for the PBS documentary The Video Game Revolution, Michael Dolan, deputy editor of FHM magazine, gave E.T. a similar ranking. Townsend placed E.T. at the top of his list of the worst video games, and said that "about a third of the people I quizzed came up with this title almost instantly, and it's not hard to see why." GameTrailers ranked it second worst on their "Top Ten Best and Worst Games of All Time" list.

People worry I might be sensitive about the E.T. debacle, but the fact is I'm always happy to discuss it. After all, it was the fastest game ever done, it was a million seller, and of the thousands of 2600 games, how many others are still a topic? Another thing I like to think about is having done E.T. (consistently rated among the worst games of all time) and Yars' Revenge (consistently rated as one of the best) I figure I have the unique distinction of having the greatest range of any game designer in history.

— Howard Scott Warshaw on E.T.'s reception

Critics often attribute the poor quality to the short development time. Townsend commented that the rushed development was very apparent. Warshaw's contributions have been met with mixed responses. Classic Gaming called the game poorly designed, while IGN's Levi Buchanan stated the "impossibly tight schedule" given to Warshaw absolves him of blame. Warshaw does not express regret for his part in E.T., and believes he created a good game given the time available to him.

== Impact ==
E.T. is often cited as one of the most important video games. GamePro, GameTrailers and Bowen cite the game as the first poor quality-film–video-game tie-in. Patrick O'Luanaigh of SCi Games called it the most famous disaster story among film-inspired video games as well as within the industry. GamePro publication named it second-worst movie game ever, citing it as an example of how poor gameplay can bring negative reception to strong licenses.

=== Effect on Atari ===
[Y]ou are probably used to hearing the words "worst game ever". Personally I dislike the phrase, because my first response is always: "Really? Did it cause the crash of the entire western games industry? No? Well, then E.T. for the Atari 2600 remains the worst game ever."

— The Escapist's Ben "Yahtzee" Croshaw on the game's infamy.

As early as January 1983, after Atari admitted that the game had sold poorly, an industry executive said that "the lesson of E.T. has not been lost on the industry". The game is associated as a cause of the video game industry crisis of 1983. Billboard magazine's Earl Paige reported that the large number of unsold E.T. games, along with an increase in competition, prompted retailers to demand official return programs from video game manufacturers. However, even before E.T was released, the industry was in an overall economic downturn from multiple factors, and E.T itself did not contribute greatly to the collapse, outside of Atari, by mid-1983. The release timing led to the game gaining the reputation of being responsible for the 1983 crash.

By the end of 1982, Atari had begun to lose dominance as more competitors entered the market. GameSpy's Classic Gaming called E.T. Atari's biggest mistake, as well as the largest financial failure in the industry. Reiley commented that the game's poor quality was responsible for ending the product life of the Atari 2600. Occurring soon after Pac-Man's negative critical response on the Atari 2600, E.T.'s poor reception was attributed by Kent to have had a negative impact on Atari's reputation and profitability. Authors Nick Montfort and Ian Bogost echoed similar comments about Pac-Man and E.T.'s combined effect on the company's reputation and the industry's reaction. Buchanan also cited the game as a factor in Atari and the industry's crash. He stated that the large amount of unsold merchandise was a financial burden to Atari, which pushed the company into debt.

== Legacy ==
=== Atari video game burial ===
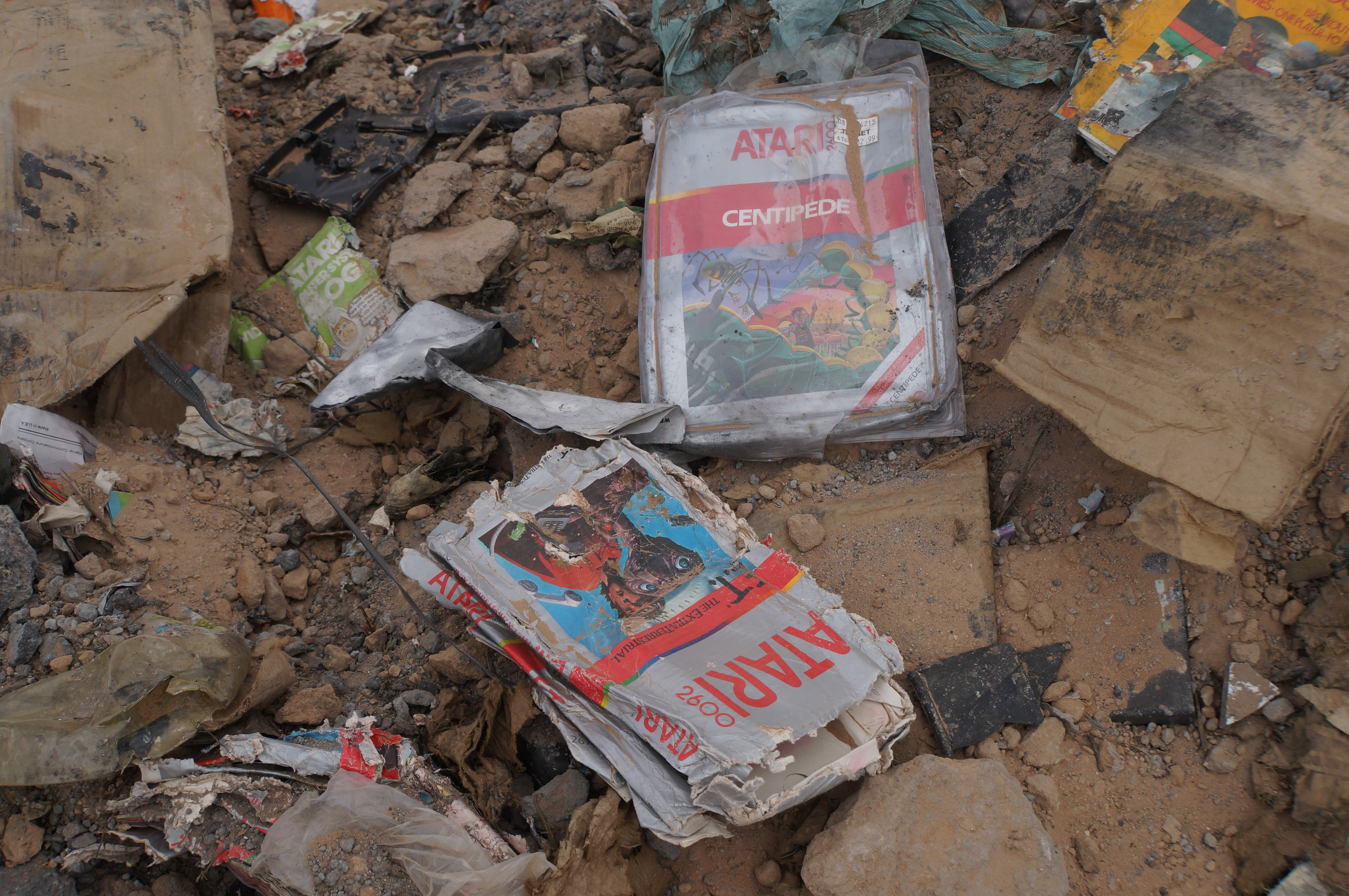
Evidence of E.T., Centipede and other Atari materials uncovered during the excavation

In September 1983, the Alamogordo Daily News of Alamogordo, New Mexico, reported in a series of articles that between ten and twenty semi-trailer truckloads of Atari boxes, cartridges, and systems from an Atari storehouse in El Paso, Texas, were crushed and buried at the landfill within the city, which was covered with concrete. It was the first time Atari dealt with the landfill, which was chosen because no scavenging was allowed and its garbage was crushed and buried nightly. Atari officials and others gave differing reports of what was buried, but it has been speculated that most unsold copies of E.T. are buried in this landfill, crushed and encased in cement. The story of the buried cartridges was erroneously regarded by some as an urban legend, with skeptics—including Warshaw—disregarding the official accounts.

On May 28, 2013, the Alamogordo City Commission approved Fuel Industries, an Ottawa-based entertainment company, for six months of landfill access both to create a documentary about the legend and to excavate the burial site. On April 26, 2014, remnants of E.T. and other Atari games were discovered in the early hours of the excavation. The burial of the E.T. cartridges is also the basis for the independent 2014 science fiction comedy Angry Video Game Nerd: The Movie, based on the webseries of the same name, and features Warshaw.

In December 2014, the Smithsonian Institution added an excavated cartridge of E.T. to their collection. In 2015, The Henry Ford museum added to their collection several excavated cartridges and a video touchpad, a sample of landfill dirt taken from the site of the burial, and items of clothing worn by the excavation team. A selection of these items is on permanent display. The Centre for Computing History in Cambridge, England, also received some artefacts from the desert, which are on permanent display in the museum gallery.

=== Attempts to improve the game ===
In 2006, Dennis Debro disassembled E.T., added comments to the generated source code, and released it to the public. In January 2013, programmer David Richardson released several unofficial fixes for the game. Patches included the removal of pixel-perfect collision detection, which caused E.T. to fall into a pit every time his sprite touched a pit entry.

== See also ==
- List of Atari 2600 games

== Bibliography ==
=== Periodicals ===
- McQuiddy, Marian E. (September 25, 1983). "Tons of Atari Games Buried; Dump here utilized". Alamogordo Daily News. p. 1. Archived from the original on August 15, 2013. Archived 2005-04-01.
- McQuiddy, Marian E. (September 27, 1983). "City to Atari: 'E.T.' trash go home". Alamogordo Daily News. Archived from the original on August 15, 2013. Archived 2005-04-01.
- McQuiddy, Marian E. (September 28, 1983). "City cementing ban on dumping: Landfill won't house any more 'Atari rejects'". Alamogordo Daily News.
- Smith, Shelley (April 12, 2005). "Raising Alamogordo's legendary Atari 'Titanic'". Alamogordo Daily News.
- Warshaw, Howard Scott (November 2007). "Core Memory". GamesTM (63): 140–141. Archived from the original on November 6, 2018.
