= Xbox Entertainment Studios =

American television and movie studio

- Type: Subsidiary
- Industry: Entertainment
- Founded: 2012; 14 years ago
- Defunct: October 29, 2014; 12 years ago
- Fate: Closed
- Successor: XP
- Headquarters: Santa Monica, California, United States
- Key people: Nancy Tellem (president)
- Services: Film production; Television production
- Parent: Microsoft Studios

Xbox Entertainment Studios was a short-lived American television and movie studio based in Santa Monica, California created internally by Microsoft Studios in 2012, in order to create "interactive television content" for Xbox Live.

On July 17, 2014, Microsoft confirmed that the studio would be closing. On October 29, 2014, both the vice president and the president of the company departed, and the company was officially closed.

== History ==
At time of closure, Xbox Entertainment Studios was developing their first projects: a documentary about the video game crash of 1983, a science-fiction drama titled Humans and a live action television series based on the Halo franchise in collaboration with film producer Steven Spielberg. Future projects were to have included a remake of the BBC sci-fi series Blake's 7, a reboot of the Canadian children's hospital documentary series Little Miracles, and an autobiographical series about rapper Nas. The studio also intended to co-produce certain live events for Xbox Live, including future editions of the Call of Duty Championship, the Miss Teen USA beauty pageant and the VGX.

Before the closure was announced, the studio released a street soccer focused reality series titled Every Street United to coincide with the 2014 FIFA World Cup. Before closing, it released the video game documentary Atari: Game Over and the series spun off from Halo.

In September 2014, The Hollywood Reporter reported that AMC was in talks to acquire the rights to revive Humans and that casting was underway.

Several years after its closure, it was revealed that the studio were developing additional projects before closing, such as an adult animated series based on the Conker franchise.

== Original programming ==
Xbox Entertainment Studios developed original films and series in collaboration with a variety of studios:

=== Series ===
Title	Genre	Premiere	Episodes	Length
Every Street United	Reality/Sports	June 15, 2014	1 season, 8 episodes	25-31 min.
Halo: Nightfall	Drama	November 11, 2014	1 season, 5 episodes	23-29 min.

=== Films ===
Title	Genre	Premiere	Length
Atari: Game Over	Documentary	November 20, 2014	66 min.

=== Specials ===
Title	Genre	Premiere	Format	Length
Bonnaroo 2014 Live Festival Experience	Live Music	June 12, 2014	Special (Live Event)	72 hrs.
Miss Teen USA 2014	Beauty pageant	August 2, 2014	Special (Live Event)	120 min.

=== Cancelled Series ===
Title	Genre	Producer(s)	Director(s)	Premiere	Episodes	Time
3-2-1 Contact	Educational	Sesame Workshop		TBA	TBA	TBA
A Walk in Your Shoes	Reality	Breakthrough Entertainment		TBA	TBA	TBA
Big Kids	Comedy			TBA	TBA	TBA
Blake's 7 Remake	Sci-fi-drama	Georgeville TV	Martin Campbell	TBA 2014	TBA	TBA
Conker's Big Break	Adult comedy			TBA	TBA	TBA
Cro	Edutainment	Sesame Workshop		TBA	TBA	TBA
The Electric Company	Educational	Sesame Workshop		TBA	TBA	TBA
Untitled Halo live-action series	Live-Action	Steven Spielberg	TBA	TBA 2014	TBA	TBA
Humans	Sci-Fi	Kudos	TBA	TBA 2015	8 Episodes	60 min.
Little Miracles	Reality	Breakthrough Entertainment		TBA	TBA	TBA
Out There	Teen drama	Sesame Workshop		TBA	TBA	TBA
Sponk!	Game show			TBA	TBA	TBA
Square One	Edutainment	Sesame Workshop		TBA	TBA	60 min.
Street Dreams	Biography	TBA	TBA	TBA 2014	TBA	30 min.

== See also ==
XP (division)
