= Atari: Game Over =

2014 documentary film

- Directed by: Zak Penn
- Produced by: Simon Chinn; Jonathan Chinn
- Starring: Zak Penn; Howard Scott Warshaw; Ernest Cline; George R. R. Martin; Nolan Bushnell
- Cinematography: Eric Zimmerman
- Edited by: Andrew Seklir
- Music by: Stephen Endelman
- Production companies: Xbox Entertainment Studios; Grainey Pictures; Fuel Entertainment; Lightbox
- Distributed by: Xbox Live
- Release date: November 20, 2014
- Running time: 66 minutes
- Country: United States
- Language: English

Atari: Game Over is a 2014 documentary film directed by Zak Penn. It is about the Atari video game burial excavation. The film was released in 2014 by Microsoft on Xbox Live.

== Cast ==
- Zak Penn
- Howard Scott Warshaw
- Ernest Cline
- George R. R. Martin
- Nolan Bushnell
- Seamus Blackley

== Development ==
The documentary was first announced on December 19, 2013.

For the documentary, the filmmakers excavated the landfill site in Alamogordo, New Mexico, where many E.T. game cartridges were buried. The excavation dig took several months of preparation, and was finally carried out on April 26, 2014. Although the digging had only been planned to go as deep as 18 feet, it actually went to 30 feet. Around 1,300 of the approximately 700,000 games buried were unearthed.

The dig lasted for approximately three hours. Only a small number of games could be recovered, because the local authority of Alamogordo only allowed the dig to last for one day, and ordered the site to be closed by April 27. Seven hundred of the 1,300 games unearthed during the excavation were to be sold by the Alamogordo City Commission, and 100 were given to the film's development companies, Lightbox and Fuel Entertainment. Alamogordo mayor Susie Galea hoped to turn the dig site into a tourist attraction.

The remaining 500 games were given to the Smithsonian Institution in Washington, DC and local New Mexico museums to be displayed. The film was released by Microsoft via its Xbox Video store on November 20, 2014. In April 2015, it was made available on Netflix and had a broadcast on Showtime.

== Reception ==
The film received mostly positive reviews.

The A.V. Club awarded it a score of C+, saying "Warshaw deserves recognition for pushing the limits of early '80s technology, but the exhumation of his final work makes a garbage mountain out of a molehill." IGN awarded it a score of 7.1 out of 10, saying "Short, funny and to the point, Atari: Game Over tells the story of E.T. the game with heart and wit." Eurogamer called it "one of the best films about gaming this year and should be seen by anyone with an interest in the medium's early wild west years."

Headlines and Global News said "There are certainly worse ways to spend an hour, so if you want to absorb an intriguing slice of video game antiquity, check out Atari: Game Over." GeekWire criticized the way that the film oversimplified Atari's downfall, but awarded it an overall positive review, saying "It's still a great story, and definitely worth watching." PC World awarded it a positive review, saying "the gaming industry deserves more warm, inclusive documentaries like this."
