= James J. Morgan =

American businessman

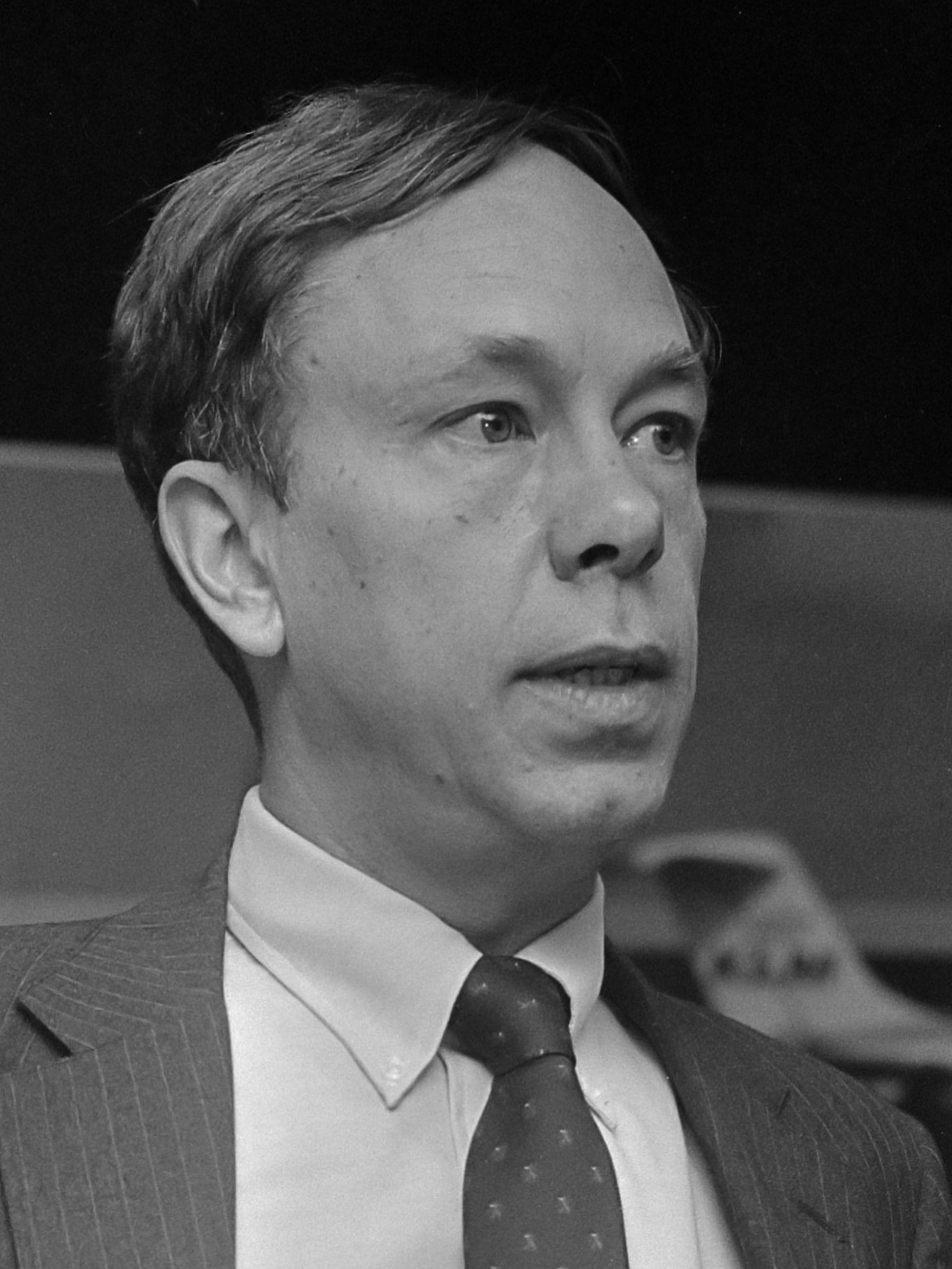
James J. Morgan (1984)

James J. Morgan (1942 – May 18, 2026) was an American business executive who was CEO of Atari from 1983 to 1984 and CEO of Philip Morris USA from 1994 to 1997.

James Morgan joined Philip Morris in 1963 following his graduation from Princeton University with a degree in history. He was Brand Manager for Marlboro from 1972 to 1973 and later was Assistant Director of Tobacco Brand Management, during which time he earned a reputation as one of the top marketing minds of the 1970s by helping to develop and market the image of the Marlboro Man. He was a member of the Tobacco Institute Communications Committee from 1981 to 1983. Morgan briefly left Philip Morris in 1983 when he was offered the position of CEO at Atari by Warner Communications, Atari's parent company at the time. At the time he left Philip Morris, Morgan was serving as vice-president of the company.

Morgan was chairman and CEO of Atari from September 1983 until July 1984, when Atari Inc. was closed and split up, with the consumer division going to Jack Tramiel.

After his departure from Atari, Morgan returned to Philip Morris. During his second stint with the company, he was most famous for his claims that cigarettes are no more addictive than gummy bears and that Philip Morris had never attempted to intentionally market tobacco products toward minors.

Morgan was appointed president and CEO in 1994 and retired from Philip Morris on November 1, 1997.

Business positions
Preceded by Ray Kassar	CEO of Atari, Inc. (A Warner Communications Company); 1983–1984	Succeeded by End
