= Aubrey Dunn Sr. =

American politician (1928–2012)

Member of the New Mexico Senate
- In office 1965–1980

Personal details
- Born: Aubrey Lyle Dunn; March 25, 1928 Alamogordo, New Mexico, U.S.
- Died: August 23, 2012 (aged 84) Wichita Falls, Texas, U.S.
- Party: Democratic
- Spouse: Betty Jo McClendon (m. 1955–2012)
- Children: 3, including Aubrey

Aubrey Lyle Dunn Sr. (March 25, 1928 – August 23, 2012), was an American politician and businessman who served as a member of the New Mexico Senate from 1965 to 1980.

== Early life ==
He was born in Alamogordo, New Mexico.

== Career ==
Elected to the New Mexico Senate in 1964, he assumed office in 1965. During his tenure, Dunn was the chair of the New Mexico Senate Finance Committee. He was also partial owner of the Alamogordo Daily News.

== Personal life ==
Dunn had three children. His son, Aubrey Dunn Jr., is a businessman and politician who served as the New Mexico Commissioner of Public Lands from 2015 to 2018.
