= XP (business division) =

Entertainment division of Xbox

- Type: Division
- Industry: Entertainment
- Predecessor: Xbox Entertainment Studios; Activision Blizzard Studios
- Founded: October 8, 2026; 38 days ago
- Headquarters: Redmond, Washington, US
- Key people: Kayleen Walters (president)
- Products: Film production; Television production; Amusement parks
- Parent: Xbox
- Divisions: Xbox Pictures; Xbox Products; Xbox Places; Xbox Partnerships

XP is an entertainment division of Xbox focused on expanding Xbox's video game franchises into film and television, consumer products, partnerships, and live experiences. The division was established in October 8, 2026, and is led by Kayleen Walters, who previously served as president of Mojang Studios and executive producer of A Minecraft Movie.

XP is organized into four primary areas: Xbox Pictures, which develops film, television, and other linear storytelling projects based on Xbox franchises; Xbox Products, which develops licensed products and merchandise; Xbox Places, which focuses on live events, immersive experiences, attractions, broadcasts, and other location-based experiences; and Xbox Partnerships, which works with creators, brands, communities, sponsors, and other partners to develop new experiences.

== History ==
=== Pre–XP ===
Xbox's efforts to expand its franchises beyond video games predated the creation of XP. The company's first major initiative was Xbox Entertainment Studios (XES), established in 2012 to develop original television and other entertainment programming for Xbox. XES announced a slate of projects including a live-action Halo television series executive produced by Steven Spielberg, a Halo digital feature executive produced by Ridley Scott and David Zucker, the unscripted series Every Street United, and the drama series Humans, produced in partnership with Channel 4 and Kudos. XES also developed documentary and other original programming for the Xbox platform.

Although XES was closed in 2014, Xbox continued pursuing film and television adaptations of its video game properties through partnerships with external production companies and studios. The Halo television series was subsequently developed by Amblin Television and 343 Industries and premiered on Paramount+ in 2022. Xbox subsequently pursued adaptations of several other major franchises. In 2022, Netflix announced a feature film and animated series based on Gears of War, with The Coalition involved in the projects.

Following Microsoft's acquisition of ZeniMax Media, Xbox also became involved in adaptations of franchises owned by Bethesda Softworks, including the Fallout television series, which was developed by Amazon MGM Studios, Kilter Films, and Bethesda Game Studios and premiered on Prime Video in 2024. Warner Bros. Pictures produced A Minecraft Movie, with Mojang and Xbox involved in the project. Released in 2025, the film became a major commercial success and was subsequently cited by Xbox as an example of the potential for its franchises outside gaming.

A Call of Duty film was later announced with Paramount Pictures, while an animated series based on Diablo was announced as another planned adaptation. Xbox also expanded its entertainment partnerships beyond adaptations of its own franchises, including a collaboration with Hideo Kojima and Kojima Productions involving film and television projects connected to OD and Physint.

=== Establishment ===
In 2026, Xbox's new CEO Asha Sharma sought to further expand the company's franchises beyond the traditional video game market. Sharma outlined an ambition for Xbox to reach one billion people through its games, films, television programs, consumer products, and other forms of entertainment. She cited the success of Fallout and A Minecraft Movie as examples of how Xbox franchises could reach audiences beyond people who play the games. The strategy also included licensing, merchandise, live events, theme parks, and other location-based experiences.

Puck reported in August 2026 that Xbox was considering a license deal that would include the rights to adapt over a dozen Xbox brands, including as Halo, World of Warcraft, The Elder Scrolls, Diablo, and others, for cinema and television. According to reports, Xbox was looking for a long-term contract worth more than $300 million. Companies reportedly interested in the bundle included Netflix, Paramount, and Universal.

Xbox established XP in October 2026 as a division intended to bring together its existing entertainment and consumer-focused activities under a single organization. According to Xbox chief strategy officer Matthew Ball, the division was created to help Xbox's franchises reach wider audiences and develop new opportunities around its intellectual properties. Walters was appointed president of XP after previously serving as president of Mojang. Before joining Xbox, she spent 13 years at Lucasfilm, where she worked on the Star Wars franchise. At Mojang, she helped oversee the expansion of Minecraft into consumer products and served as an executive producer of A Minecraft Movie.

According to Puck, Netflix offered Xbox an exclusive seven-year deal worth $500 million for the film and television adaptation rights. However, the deal fell through after Xbox sought $800 million. Xbox is now looking for a new partner.

== Projects ==
=== Xbox Pictures ===
==== Films ====
Title	Release date	Notes	Ref.
A Minecraft Movie Squared	July 23, 2027	co-production with Warner Bros. Pictures, Legendary Pictures, Vertigo Entertainment, On the Roam, and Mojang Studios.	
Call of Duty	June 30, 2028	co-production with Paramount Pictures, Activision, Film 44, and Bosque Ranch Productions.	
Untitled Gears of War film	TBD	co-production with Netflix and The Coalition.	
Untitled Sea of Thieves film	TBD	co-production with Hisako Films and Rare.	

==== Television shows ====
Title	Date	Seasons	Notes	Ref
Fallout	2024–present	2 seasons	co-production with Amazon MGM Studios, Bethesda Game Studios, Big Indie Pictures, and Kilter Films; starting with season 3.	
Fallout Shelter	TBD	TBD	co-production with Amazon MGM Studios, Bethesda Game Studios, and Kilter Films.	
Grounded	TBD	TBD	co-production with Bardel Entertainment and Obsidian Entertainment.	
Wolfenstein	TBD	TBD	co-production with Amazon MGM Studios, MachineGames, and Kilter Films.	
Untitled Gears of War animated series	TBD	TBD	co-production with Netflix, Netflix Animation Studios, and The Coalition.	
Untitled Minecraft animated series	TBD	TBD	co-production with WildBrain Studios, Netflix, Netflix Animation Studios, and Mojang Studios.	
Untitled Diablo animated series	TBD	TBD	co-production with Netflix, Netflix Animation Studios, and Blizzard Entertainment.	

=== Xbox Places ===
==== Attractions ====
Title	Note	Ref
Minecraft World	Attraction at Chessington World of Adventures, operated by Merlin Entertainments.	
