= Ray Kassar =

American business executive (1928–2017)

- Born: January 2, 1928; Brooklyn, New York
- Died: December 10, 2017 (aged 89); Vero Beach, Florida
- Occupation: Executive
- Known for: President of Atari Inc.

Raymond Edward Kassar (January 2, 1928 – December 10, 2017) was an American business executive who served as president, and later CEO, of Atari Inc. from 1978 to 1983. He had previously been executive vice-president of Burlington Industries, the world's largest textile company at the time, and president of its Burlington House division.

== Career ==
Ray Kassar began working for Burlington Industries in 1948 and later became the executive vice-president of the company and president of its Burlington House division. A member of the Board of Directors, Kassar spent 26 years at Burlington before he left the company to start his own textile company that manufactured cotton shirts in Egypt and marketed them under the "Kassar" label.

Kassar was hired in February 1978 as president of Atari's consumer division by Warner Communications, who at the time owned Atari. By this time, rifts had begun to develop between the original Atari Inc. staff (most of whom had engineering backgrounds) and the new hires brought in by Warner (who, like Kassar, mostly had business backgrounds).

In November 1978, when Atari Inc. co-founder Nolan Bushnell was fired after a dispute with Warner over the future of Atari Inc., Kassar became CEO. Kassar's experience at Burlington Industries had given him a taste for order, organization, and efficiency, and his efforts to revamp Atari along similar lines provoked substantial animosity. Atari Inc. began to promote games all year around instead of just at the Christmas season. Kassar became derisively known to many at Atari Inc. as the "sock king" and the "towel czar" (due to his previous years in the textile industry) after he once referred to Atari programmers as "high-strung prima donnas" in an interview with the San Jose Mercury News in 1979.

During Kassar's tenure, Atari Inc.'s sales grew from $75 million in 1977 to over $2.2 billion three years later. Though Atari enjoyed some of its greatest success during this period, the stifling atmosphere and lack of royalties or recognition to the individual game designers angered employees, many of whom quit. During this period, nearly all members of the original Atari Inc. staff, including Al Alcorn, quit or were fired. Atari Inc.'s upper management also suffered severe turnover rates. Many blamed Kassar's autocratic management style, but Kassar was not held accountable.

One of the most notable turnovers was when four programmers were unsatisfied with their paychecks. They felt they were making a very paltry salary considering their work designing the games that made Atari millions of dollars. When they asked Kassar for a small commission, David Crane recalls that Kassar responded, "You are no more important to that game than the guy on the assembly line who puts it together." Crane and three others resigned from Atari and formed their own company, Activision, which became the first ever third party developer.

In 1981, the highly popular and successful game Yars' Revenge was released for the Atari 2600. Howard Scott Warshaw, the game's designer, got the names "Yar" and "Razak" by jokingly spelling "Ray Kassar" backwards. Warshaw claimed that the game was "Ray's revenge on Activision".

In 1982, Kassar donated a sum of money to Brown University, his alma mater. In recognition, the university named a university building the "Edward W. Kassar House" after his father. The Kassar House is currently home to the university's mathematics department.

Contrary to popular belief, Kassar was not responsible for the deal to make the E.T. the Extra-Terrestrial game from the blockbuster movie. Steve Ross, CEO of Atari's parent company Warner Communications, was the one who was in talks with Steven Spielberg and Universal Pictures. Kassar's response to Ross's query of how he liked the idea of making an E.T. based video game was, "I think it's a dumb idea. We've never really made an action game out of a movie." Ultimately though, the decision was not Kassar's to make and it went through, and it was reported that Atari Inc. had paid US$20–25 million for the rights—an abnormally high figure for video game licensing at the time. The game was not only poorly received and sold poorly, but demand had been widely overestimated.

In July 1983, Kassar was fired due to continuing massive losses at Atari. In December 1982, Kassar had sold 5,000 shares of stock in Warner Communications only 23 minutes before a much lower than expected fourth quarter earnings report would cause Warner stock to drop nearly 40% in value in the following days. The Securities and Exchange Commission accused Kassar and then Atari Inc. vice-president Dennis Groth of trading stock with illegal insider knowledge. Kassar settled, returning his profits without acknowledging guilt or innocence. The shares that Kassar sold actually constituted only a small amount of his total holdings in the company, and the SEC later cleared him of any wrongdoing.

Upon Kassar's resignation, James J. Morgan, formerly of Philip Morris, replaced him as CEO of Atari Inc. in September 1983.

He was a collector and private investor and sat on the Board of the American Hospital of Paris Foundation.

From December 2, 2000 until February 11, 2001, a series of photographs culled from Kassar's significant personal collection were on display at the Santa Barbara Museum of Art. The exhibition, entitled "Painterly Photographs: The Raymond E. Kassar Collection", presented 33 works made for exhibition from 1900 to 1910, featuring some of the most important camera artists of the time, including Alfred Stieglitz, Edward Steichen, Heinrich Kuehn, George Seeley and Clarence H. White. Portions of the collection have been lent on only two other occasions, in 1994 to the J. Paul Getty Museum in Los Angeles and in 2012 to the Neue Galerie New York.

Business positions
Preceded by Nolan Bushnell	CEO of Atari, Inc. (A Warner Communications Company); 1979–1983	Succeeded by James J. Morgan
