= Yar's Revenge =

2011 video game

- Developer(s): Killspace Entertainment
- Publisher(s): Atari
- Series: Yars
- Platform(s): Xbox 360, Windows
- Release: Xbox 360; April 13, 2011; Windows; April 28, 2011
- Genre(s): Rail shooter
- Mode(s): Single-player, multiplayer

Yar's Revenge is a rail shooter video game developed by Killspace Entertainment and published by Atari. It is a reboot of Yars' Revenge, the original Atari's 1982 shooter for the Atari 2600. It was released for the Xbox 360 through Xbox Live Arcade and Windows in April 2011. The game reinterprets the original's setting and characters, adopting anime graphics and making the formerly insectoid Yar species into four-armed humanoid aliens. A nameless Yar girl is brainwashed by the Qotile evil empire, but after she is shot down and rescued, she seeks revenge on her former master. The game received mixed reviews from critics, who praised its graphics, but criticized its gameplay, sound, and lack of voice acting or online multiplayer functionality, calling it difficult to recommend even at its relatively low price point.

== Development ==
The player character (top left) shoots at enemies using a targeting reticle while flying over the landscape.

Yar's Revenge was the first major project from Killspace Entertainment, a studio made up of former Obsidian Entertainment, Pandemic Studios, Red 5 Studios and EA Los Angeles developers. Their primary focus had been on first and third-person action-adventure games with an emphasis on sci-fi and horror, but Killspace pitched the idea of a rail shooter to Atari, who wanted to make something "new and exciting" with the franchise.

The game's environments were stated to be inspired by works by Hayao Miyazaki, with the game using an anime art style due to Killspace's experience with it. Artist Evan Cagle was stated to be a fan of the anime genre. The developers aimed for the gameplay to be "fast and frenetic".

== Reception ==
Reception

Aggregate score
Aggregator	Score
Metacritic	55/100 (Xbox 360); 56/100 (Windows)

Review scores
Publication	Score
Eurogamer	5/10
Game Informer	7.5/10
GameSpot	5/10
IGN	6/10

The game received an aggregate score of 55/100 for the Xbox 360 version and 56/100 for the Windows version on Metacritic, indicating mixed or average reviews.

Matt Miller of Game Informer rated the game 7.5/10 points, calling it "competent", but held back from greatness by lack of enemy variety or variation in level design. Describing its story as "eclectic and oddly philosophical", he said that the adaptation's strangeness made it interesting. However, he noted that after the first couple of levels, the game became monotonous, and that it did not match the quality of other well-known rail shooters.

Jon Michael of IGN rated the game 6/10 points, saying poor voice acting would have been better than no voice acting due to the difficulty reading the game's story, especially on a standard-definition television. He also criticized the lack of enemy variety, saying that there were only three major types from beginning to end. He called character movement inconsistent, and bemoaned the lack of online co-op, with only local co-op available. While saying it was "tailor-made" for shooter fans wanting a challenge, he found it difficult to recommend even for $10.

Kristan Reed of Eurogamer rated the game 5/10 points, remarking that it was nonsensical to completely ignore the source material, and that while a game of "undeniable excellence" would have made up for the changes, the game's controls were "inelegant". Criticizing the need to pilot Yar and her targeting reticle independently, he called the game's encounters "underwhelming" despite "the occasional nod to the visual minimalism of Rez". Heidi Kemps of GameSpot also rated the game 5/10 points, saying that while it had "great art design", the gameplay was "dull" despite being heavily inspired by Panzer Dragoon, Star Fox and Sin and Punishment. She called it a "prime example of squandered potential".
