= Zak Penn =

American screenwriter (born 1968)

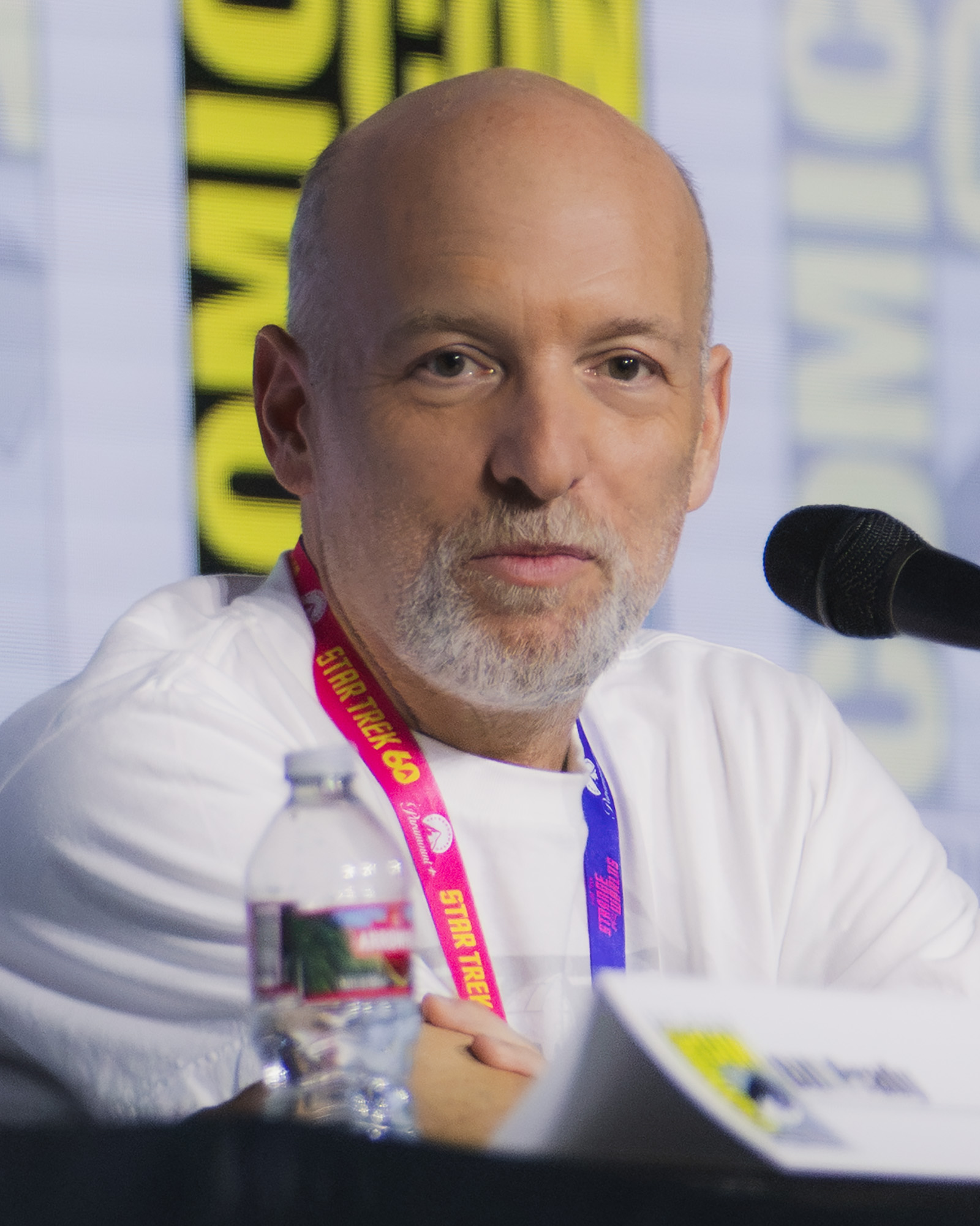
- Penn at the 2026 San Diego Comic-Con
- Born: March 23, 1968 (age 58); New York, U.S.
- Occupation: Screenwriter

Zak Penn (born March 23, 1968) is an American screenwriter. Penn wrote and directed Incident at Loch Ness and The Grand, wrote the script for The Incredible Hulk, co-wrote the scripts for X2, X-Men: The Last Stand, and the story for The Avengers. With Michael Karnow, Penn is the co-creator of the television series Alphas on the Syfy network.

== Early life ==
Penn was born in New York. He is the son of New York businessman and lawyer Arthur Penn, who led the acquisition of the Capital Markets Assurance Corporation from Citicorp.

Zak Penn graduated from Wesleyan University in 1990. His screenplay for PCU was based on his experiences at the Eclectic Society house.

== Career ==
Films that Penn has been involved in writing include Last Action Hero, X2, X-Men: The Last Stand, and Elektra. Penn wrote early drafts of Hulk, The Incredible Hulk, The Avengers and Free Guy.

Penn is also a jury member for the digital studio Filmaka, a platform for undiscovered filmmakers to show their work to industry professionals.

In July 2012, Avatar Press released the first issue of Penn's first comic book, Hero Worship. The six-issue series is co-written with Scott Murphy (scriptwriter for Star Wars: The Clone Wars) and illustrated by artist Michael DiPascale. The comic series centers on Zenith, an indestructible hero who has fans following every disaster, trying to catch a glimpse of the ultimate celebrity and risking their own lives in the process. One fan becomes so obsessed that it leads to the development of his own powers.

He directed the 2014 documentary film Atari: Game Over.

== Filmography ==
=== Films ===
Key
†	Denotes films that have not yet been released

Year	Title	Credited as		Notes
Year	Title	Director	Writer	Notes
1993	Last Action Hero	No	Story	Co-story writer with Adam Leff
1994	PCU	No	Yes	Co-screenwriter with Adam Leff
1997	Men in Black	No	Uncredited	
1998	Antz	No	Uncredited	Story consultant
1999	Inspector Gadget	No	Yes	Co-screenwriter with Kerry Ehrin
2000	Charlie's Angels	No	Uncredited	Script revisions
2001	Behind Enemy Lines	No	Yes	Co-screenwriter with David Veloz
2002	Reign of Fire	No	Uncredited	
2003	X2	No	Story	Co-story writer with David Hayter and Bryan Singer
2004	Incident at Loch Ness	Yes	Yes	Directorial debut; co-producer with Werner Herzog; on-screen appearance
2004	Suspect Zero	No	Yes	Co-screenwriter Billy Ray
2005	Elektra	No	Yes	Co-screenwriter with Stu Zicherman and Raven Metzner
2006	X-Men: The Last Stand	No	Yes	Co-screenwriter with Simon Kinberg
2007	The Grand	Yes	Yes	Co-screenwriter with Matt Bierman
2008	The Incredible Hulk	No	Yes	Story; with uncredited screenwriting rewrites by Edward Norton
2012	The Avengers	No	Story	Co-story writer with Joss Whedon
2014	Atari: Game Over	Yes	No	Documentary; on-screen appearance
2018	Ready Player One	No	Yes	Co-screenwriter with Ernest Cline
2021	Free Guy	No	Yes	Co-screenwriter with Matt Lieberman
2027	The Beekeeper 2 †	No	Yes	Co-screenwriter with Kurt Wimmer

=== Television ===
Year	Title	Credited as				Notes
Year	Title	Writer	Producer	Showrunner	Creator	Notes
2003–2004	Ozzy & Drix	No	Executive	No	No	Season 2
2011–2012	Alphas	Yes	Executive	No	Yes	Co-created with Michael Karnow
2023	Beacon 23	Yes	Executive	Yes	Yes	
2026	Stuart Fails to Save the Universe	Yes	Executive	Yes	Yes	Co-created with Chuck Lorre and Bill Prady

=== Video games ===
Year	Title	Credited as			Notes
Year	Title	Creative director	Writer	Technical director	Notes
2005	Fantastic Four	No	Yes	No	Credited for game story and dialogue
2006	X-Men: The Official Game	No	Yes	No	Credited for screenplay
