= Alamogordo Daily News =

Newspaper in Alamogordo, New Mexico

- Front page of Alamogordo Daily News on May 16, 2008
- Type: Daily newspaper
- Format: Broadsheet
- Owner(s): El Rito Media, LLC
- Founder: J.H. Lightfoot
- Publisher: Richard L. Connor
- General manager: Frank Leto
- Founded: 1896
- Language: English
- Headquarters: 518 E. 24th Street; Alamogordo, New Mexico
- OCLC number: 10674593
- Website: alamogordonews.com

Alamogordo Daily News, founded in 1898, is a daily newspaper published in Alamogordo, New Mexico, United States.

The paper was an evening paper until September 1, 2006, published weekday evenings and Sunday mornings. It then switched to a morning paper, published daily except Mondays. In March 2024, the newspaper announced it would switch from carrier to postal delivery.

== History ==
In August 1896, the Tularosa Chief was first published in Tularosa, New Mexico. It was founded by J.H. Lightfoot. In November 1897, the paper relocated to La Luz and was renamed to the Sacramento Chief. It relocated again to Alamogordo a year later. In 1899, the Alamogordo Printing Company acquired the paper and renamed it to the Alamogordo News. W.S. Shepherd soon acquired the paper.

In December 1912, the Alamogordo News and Otero County Advertiser merged to form the Alamogordo News-Advertiser. Charles. P. Downs was editor. In January 1914, Clarence W. Morgan took charge of the paper and renamed it to the Otero County News. The name was later changed back to the Alamogordo News. In 1922, the paper absorbed the Alamogordo Cloudcrofter. It continued as a weekly until the 1950s when it went daily.

In March 1953, C.W. Morgan died. That December, the Morgan family sold the paper to Billie Holder and Rolland Jacquart. Three years later Holder bought out Jacquart. Aubrey Dunn Sr. was soon hired as the paper's business manager and eventually became co-owner. He served for 15 years in the New Mexico Senate but abruptly resigned in 1979 to focus on the paper.

After Holder and Dunn, the News was acquired by several chains, including Donrey Media Group in 1983, Community Newspaper Holdings in 1998, MediaNews Group in 2001, Gannett in 2015, and El Rito Media, LLC in 2024.

== See also ==
- Aubrey Dunn, Sr., New Mexico state senator and partial owner of Alamogordo Daily News
- Atari video game burial, which was first reported on by the Alamogordo Daily News
