= Atari Recharged =

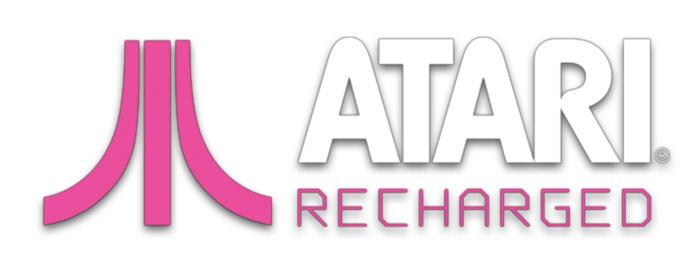
- Genre: Arcade
- Developers: Adamvision Studios; Sneakybox
- Publisher: Atari Inc.
- Platform: Various: Atari VCS Nintendo Switch PlayStation 4 PlayStation 5 Stadia Windows Xbox One Xbox Series X/S
- First release: Missile Command: Recharged; May 27, 2020
- Latest release: Berzerk: Recharged; November 8, 2023

Atari Recharged is a series of video games by Atari, Inc. that are revivals and re-imaginings of classic Atari franchises. The series was launched in 2020 with Missile Command: Recharged as the first release. The series has been released digitally on the Atari VCS, PC, Google Stadia, Xbox, PlayStation, and Nintendo Switch, as well as physical releases by Limited Run Games.

== Games ==
The series has completely revived some franchises. Berzerk: Recharged, released November 8, 2023, is the first game in the Berzerk series since the 1980s.

Game developer Alan-1 Inc. licensed all ten Atari Recharged games with the intent to produce them in coin-operated video arcade cabinets. The first of those to receive a release in this format was Asteroids: Recharged, which features significant changes from the console version.

Atari Recharged titles
#	Game	Release date
1	Missile Command: Recharged	May 27, 2020
2	Centipede: Recharged	September 29, 2021
3	Black Widow: Recharged	October 28, 2021
4	Asteroids: Recharged	December 13, 2021
5	Breakout: Recharged	February 10, 2022
6	Basic Math: Recharged	April 1, 2022
7	Gravitar: Recharged	June 2, 2022
8	Yars: Recharged	August 23, 2022
9	Caverns of Mars: Recharged	March 9, 2023
10	Quantum: Recharged	August 17, 2023
11	Berzerk: Recharged	November 8, 2023
12	Asteroids: Recharged Arcade	November 1, 2024

== See also ==
- List of Atari video games (2001–present)
