= Raiders of the Lost Ark (video game) =

1982 video game

- Developer: Atari, Inc.
- Publishers: Atari, Inc.
- Designer: Howard Scott Warshaw
- Series: Indiana Jones
- Platform: Atari 2600
- Release: November 1982
- Genre: Adventure
- Mode: Single-player

Raiders of the Lost Ark is a 1982 adventure game developed and published by Atari, Inc. for the Atari 2600, based on the 1981 film of the same name. The game was designed by Howard Scott Warshaw.

== Gameplay ==
Raiders of the Lost Ark on Atari 2600

The player controls Indiana Jones as he searches for the lost Ark of the Covenant. The game requires the player to use two different controllers: controller 2 moves Jones and its button uses an item; controller 1 selects the item to use and its button drops the item.

The video game is set in the city of Cairo in 1936, represented by an entrance room and a marketplace. From the entrance room, the player can blast a hole in the wall with a grenade and enter the Temple of the Ancients. Two paths await inside the Temple, both of which contain various dangers, after which the player will at last find the treasure room. Gold and artifacts can be picked up in the treasure room which will help the player later in the game.

The player must cross a mesa, on the other side of which lies the Map Room where the location of the Lost Ark is revealed. South of the Map Room is a Thieves Den and a Black Market. The Black Market contains various figures, such as two sheikhs, a Tsetse fly and a lunatic, and items needed to win the game (most notably a shovel).

After acquiring all needed items from the various rooms, the player returns to the mesa and jumps off using a parachute. The player goes inside the mesa, via a small hole at the end of a branch, and digs up the Ark, after dodging more thieves.

== Development ==
Howard Scott Warshaw volunteered to work on the game when it was offered at Atari. While Warshaw felt that doing adaptations of popular arcade games "always seemed like an exercise in futility" to him, the chance to adapt the film felt like a perfect middle ground of making an original game that had the boost of a popular property. Warshaw met with director Steven Spielberg to discuss the game and after began development of it in mid-1981.

Warshaw did not want to make a game where you could only carry one item at a time such as in Adventure (1980). To avoid this, he had the game use the second joystick to let players manage items they had collected. Warshaw wanted a game that had more unique play scenarios than other games and felt the game had to emphasize the adventure nature of the film, so began stripping down the film to its key points, such as finding the Ark of the Covenant. This led to him developing areas to surround this such as a treasure room and a map room. Warshaw also developed new elements such as an in-game timer that made elements of the game change as time went on.

Raiders of the Lost Ark was made for an eight kilobyte ROM cartridge. While Warshaw handled most of the graphics for the game himself, graphic artist Jerome Domurat produced the animated character of Indiana Jones. The packaging, manual, and advertising artwork was painted by Atari art director James Kelly.

== Release ==
The marketing department at Atari included hints in the game manual which was against Warshaw's wishes. He reflected on it saying he "didn't see the point of having this elaborate game if people could just open the manual and run through it. In retrospect, I realise we should've given people more, not less. I've learned that people want a road map and then they can choose whether to use it or not."

The game was released in November 1982. While reports have stated that the game was financially successful for Atari, leading to Spielberg asking Warshaw to adapt his next film project, E.T., Raiders of the Lost Ark was described by Bruce Chadwick as selling below Atari's expectations at less than a million copies sold by February 1983.

== Reception ==
From contemporary reviews, Richard A. Edwards reviewed Raiders of the Lost Ark in The Space Gamer. Edwards commented that "though the graphics are not great (but they are fairly good) and the Raiders of the Lost Ark theme song has a note or two off-key, this is still the adventure cartridge of the year. Those gamers who prefer magic items, puzzles, and thoughtful play mixed with arcade movement should find Raiders well worth the price". Video Games in 1983 called Raiders of the Lost Ark "a more complex adventure game" than E.T., released a month later. The magazine noted that the documentation was incomplete and advised players to experiment with multiple ways to progress. Electronic Games stated that the game was not exciting and "doesn't quite live up to [the film]."

From retrospective reviews, Skyler Miller of Allgame found the game graphics average for an Atari 2600 game of the period, with weak animation. Miller concluded that if you could get over these elements, "you'll find a surprisingly complex game that will definitely give your problem-solving skills a workout."
