= Howard Scott Warshaw =

American game designer and psychotherapist

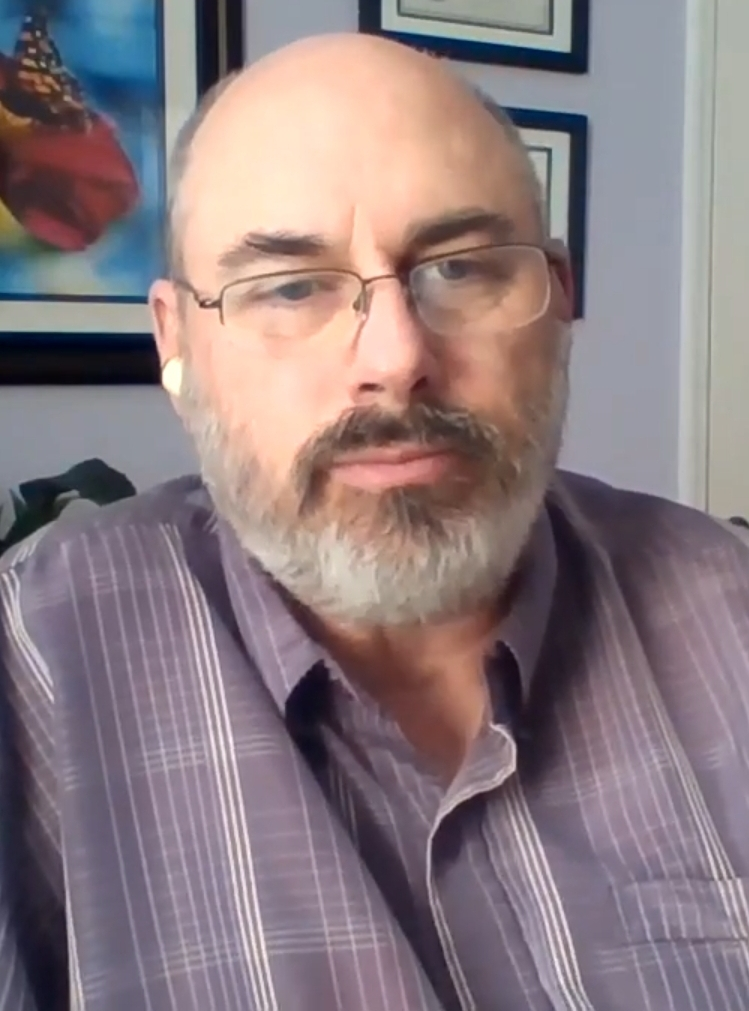
- Warshaw in 2020
- Born: July 30, 1957 (age 69); Colorado, U.S.
- Education: Master of Engineering; Master of Arts in Counseling Psychology
- Alma mater: Tulane University; John F. Kennedy University
- Occupation: Psychotherapist
- Writing career
- Pen name: HSW, The Silicon Valley Therapist
- Language: English
- Notable works: E.T.: The Extra-Terrestrial; Raiders of the Lost Ark; Yars' Revenge
- Website: hswarshaw.com

Howard Scott Warshaw (born July 30, 1957), also known as HSW, is an American psychotherapist and former game designer. He worked at Atari, Inc. in the early 1980s, where he designed and programmed the Atari 2600 games Yars' Revenge, Raiders of the Lost Ark, and E.T. the Extra-Terrestrial.

Warshaw has written four books, and produced and directed three documentaries.

== Early life ==
Warshaw was "Colorado-born, Jersey-raised, and New Orleans-schooled." He attended Tulane University, where he received a bachelor's degree with a double major in Math and Economics. He graduated Phi Beta Kappa and received a scholarship for his graduate work in Computer Science. One year later, he received his master's degree in Computer Engineering.

== Career ==
After graduation, he was hired at Hewlett-Packard as a multi-terminal systems engineer. Feeling unfulfilled, he began looking for another job. In 1981, he was hired at Atari, Inc.

=== Atari ===
Warshaw's first success, Yars' Revenge, had been conceived as an Atari 2600 adaptation of the arcade game Star Castle. However, as limitations became clear, Warshaw re-adapted the concept into a new game involving mutated houseflies defending their world against an alien attacker. The game's working title was Time Freeze. Playtesting by Atari found that the game was popular with women. The game was a major success and is still regarded as one of the best games made for the Atari 2600. This led Warshaw to be chosen to design the game adaptation of the film Raiders of the Lost Ark, which was also a critically acclaimed commercial success.

His success on Raiders likewise made him designer and programmer of the ill-fated Atari 2600 adaptation of the film E.T. the Extra-Terrestrial. Problems began early as he was only given five weeks to go from concept to finished product. Warshaw was assisted by Jerome Domurat, a graphics designer at Atari. Although the game was finished on time, it was poorly received and seen as confusing and frustrating. Atari took a major financial loss on the project which, combined with the company's other poor business decisions and the video game crash of 1983, led to the company being divided and sold within two years. During this time, Warshaw developed and almost finished another game called Saboteur. He left the company before it was completed. It was then re-adapted into a game based on the television series The A-Team but this also remained unfinished.

=== Later work ===
Later, he studied video production and released the documentary From There to Here: Scenes of Passage, a chronicle of the American immigration of two Russian women from the same family, one in 1920 and the other in 1980. Subsequently, he went on to produce the multi-part documentary Once Upon Atari, a collection of interviews and stories of employees and designers at Atari during the late 1970s and early 1980s.

On November 14, 2012, Warshaw became a licensed psychotherapist in California. He has a private practice in Los Altos as well as doing public speaking and training delivery in the Silicon Valley area.

In June 2013, Warshaw became a contributing artist to the Museum of Modern Art in New York where Yars' Revenge was accepted as a part of the new video game collection. As of that time, this game became part of the museum's second round of additions, out of the first twenty-one total items, in their video game collection which had begun in late 2012.

In early 2020, Warshaw published Inspired Therapist: My Inner Journey from Wannabe to Healer, relating "a series of reflections about therapy, what it means to be a therapist, and what it means to live an authentic life". Also in 2020, Warshaw published a companion volume to his documentary Once Upon Atari, a book titled Once Upon Atari: How I made History by Killing an Industry.

== Works ==
Year	Title	Role(s)
1982	Yars' Revenge	Designer, Programmer
1982	Raiders of the Lost Ark	Designer, Programmer
1982	E.T. the Extra-Terrestrial	Designer, Programmer, Artist
2000	BattleTanx: Global Assault	Programmer
2001	WarJetz	Director
2005	Yar's Return	Designer
2008	NBA Ballers: Chosen One	Systems Programmers
2008	Blitz: The League II	Production
